= Archduke Franz Josef of Austria, Prince of Tuscany =

Archduke Franz Josef
- Duke of Madrid (in pretense)

Carlist-Carloctavismo claimant to the Spanish throne
- Pretense: 1961 – 9 May 1975
- Predecessor: Archduke Anton of Austria
- Successor: Dominic von Habsburg
- Born: 4 February 1905; Vienna, Austria
- Died: 9 May 1975 (aged 70); Hernstein, Austria
- Spouse: Marta Baumer (m. 1937; div. 1954) Maria Elena Seunig, Condesa de Basus (m. 1962)
- Issue: Patricia Gräfin von Habsburg-Lothringen
Names
- Don Francisco José Carlos Leopold Blanca Adelgunda Ignacio Rafael Miguel de Habsburgo-Lorena y de Borbón and Franz Josef Karl Leopold Blanka Adelgunde Ignatius Raphael Michael von Habsburg-Lothringen, Erzherzog von Österreich, Prinz von Toskana
- House: Habsburg-Lorraine
- Father: Archduke Leopold Salvator of Austria
- Mother: Princess Blanca of Bourbon

Archduke Franz Josef of Austria–Tuscany (German: Franz Josef Karl Leopold Blanka Adelgunde Ignatius Raphael Michael von Habsburg-Lothringen, Erzherzog von Österreich, Prinz von Toskana; 4 February 1905 – 9 May 1975) was the fourth son of Archduke Leopold Salvator of Austria, Prince of Tuscany and Princess Blanca of Bourbon. At the fall of Habsburg monarchy he moved to Barcelona, where he became a naturalized Spanish citizen. He married morganatically twice and had a daughter from his second marriage. During World War II he lived in the United States, working in the forestry industry. In 1955 he returned to Austria. He inherited the Carlist pretensions to the Spanish throne of his brother Archduke Karl Pius and called himself Duke of Madrid. He died in 1975.

== Early life ==
Archduke Franz Josef of Austria was born on February 4, 1905, in Vienna, the ninth child and fourth son of Archduke Leopold Salvator of Austria and Princess Blanca of Bourbon. His father, a member of the Tuscan line of the Habsburg family and thus a descendant of Emperor Leopold II, had been Inspector General of the Austrian Artillery and Commander of the 18th infantry regiment. Franz Josef's mother, Infanta Blanca of Spain, was the eldest daughter of Infante Carlos, Duke of Madrid, who had been, as Carlos VII, pretender to the Spanish throne. Archduke Franz Josef was given the baptismal names Franz Josef Karl Leopold Blanka Adelgunde Ignatius Rafael Michael von Habsburg-Lothringen.

Archduke Franz Josef's early years coincided with the last period of the Habsburg monarchy. His childhood was spent in the various properties owned by his parents, enjoying a comfortable and privileged life. The family's main residences were the Palais Toskana in the district of Wiede in Viena and Schloss Wilhelminenberg, on the Eastern slopes of the Gallitzinberg. Due to World War I, Franz Josef was not educated by private tutors like his three eldest brothers had been, but was sent instead to Stella Matutina, a Catholic school for boys run by Jesuits priest in Feldkirch. He shared the same classroom with Prince Gaetan of Bourbon Parma, the youngest brother of Empress Zita.

== Exile ==
At the fall of Habsburg monarchy, the republican government of Austria confiscated all the properties of the Habsburgs. Franz Josef's family lost all its fortune. His two eldest brothers, Archdukes Rainer and Leopold, decided to remain in Austria and recognized the new republic. The rest of the family emigrated to Spain. In January 1919 the family arrived in Barcelona where they settled for over a decade. To continue his education, Franz Joseph was sent to Bonanova, a boarding school run by catholic priest. In 1926, Archduke Franz Josef officially became a Spanish citizen with the name Francisco José Carlos de Habsburgo y Borbón.

While completing his education, Franz Joseph worked in Barcelona as a garage mechanic. He graduated from the Peritaje industrial de Terraza and the Barcelona School of Agriculture and obtained his license as a pilot at the Marine Flying School. He purchased a small airplane with his brother Archduke Anton of Austria. The two brothers worked giving flying tours over Barcelona.

In the turmoil of the Spanish Civil War, Archduke Franz Joseph returned to Austria. He initially lived with his widowed mother and his unmarried siblings, Archduchess Dolores and Archduke Karl Pius of Austria, Prince of Tuscany. Working in advertising, he moved to Paris where he found employment in tourism promotion for two airlines.

== Marriage and later life ==
While on a visit to Berlin, he fell in love with an Austrian emigre, Marta Baumer, who had divorced Baron von Kahlera, a wealthy Czech sugar exporter. She was a daughter of Andreas Rudolf, an army officer, and Anna Countess di Locatelli. With his mother's approval, Archduke Franz Joseph married Martha Baumer in London on 22 July 1937. Theirs was a morganatic union. The couple settled in France. During World War II, the archduke emigrated with his wife to the United States. The couple settled in Franconia, New Hampshire, where he worked in the agricultural and forestry industry. During this period of his life, Archduke Franz Josef collaborated with author Bertita Harding in her book Lost Waltz: A Story of Exile, which recounts the story of his family from the last years of the Habsburg dynasty until 1943. After the war, the archduke and his wife returned to Europe. They lived for sometime in Madrid and in Berne Village, Lower Austria. The marriage was childless and ended in divorce in 1954.

From 1955 Archduke Franz Josef lived again in Austria working in the forestry industry. He married, secondly, Maria Elena Seunig, Condesa de Basus, daughter of Egon Seunig and Nella Penelope Gialdini, on 21 January 1962 at Zürich, Switzerland. The couple had one daughter, Patricia of Habsburg-Lorraine.

At the death of his brothers Archduke Karl Pius of Austria, Prince of Tuscany, in 1953, and Archduke Leopold of Austria, in 1958, Archduke Franz Josef inherited the Carlist pretensions to the Spanish throne from them as a nephew of Infante Jaime, Duke of Madrid. He assumed the title of Duke of Madrid and was involved in the Carlist movement, as Francisco I, from 1956 until his death. He died on 9 May 1975 at Hernstein, Austria.

== Ancestry ==
Ancestors of Archduke Franz Josef of Austria, Prince of Tuscany

8. Leopold II, Grand Duke of Tuscany
4. Archduke Karl Salvator of Austria, Prince of Tuscany
9. Princess Maria Antonia of the Two Sicilies
2. Archduke Leopold Salvator, Prince of Tuscany
10. Ferdinand II of the Two Sicilies
5. Princess Maria Immaculata of Bourbon-Two Sicilies
11. Maria Theresa of Austria
1. Archduke Franz Joseph of Austria, Prince of Tuscany
12. Juan, Count of Montizón
6. Carlos, Duke of Madrid
13. Archduchess Maria Beatrix of Austria-Este
3. Infanta Blanca of Spain
14. Charles III, Duke of Parma
7. Princess Margherita of Bourbon-Parma
15. Princess Louise Marie Thérèse of France

== Bibliography ==
- Heras y Borrero, Francisco. Un pretendiente desconocido. Carlos de Habsburgo. El otro candidato de Franco, 2004. ISBN 8497725565
- Harding, Bertita. Lost Waltz: A Story of Exile. Bobbs-Merrill, 1944. ASIN: B0007DXCLY
- McIntosh, David. The Unknown Habsburgs. Rosvall Royal Books, 2000. ISBN 91-973978-0-6
