= Archduchess Assunta of Austria =

Archduchess of Austria and Princess of Tuscany

Archduchess Assunta
- Mrs. Joseph Hopfinger
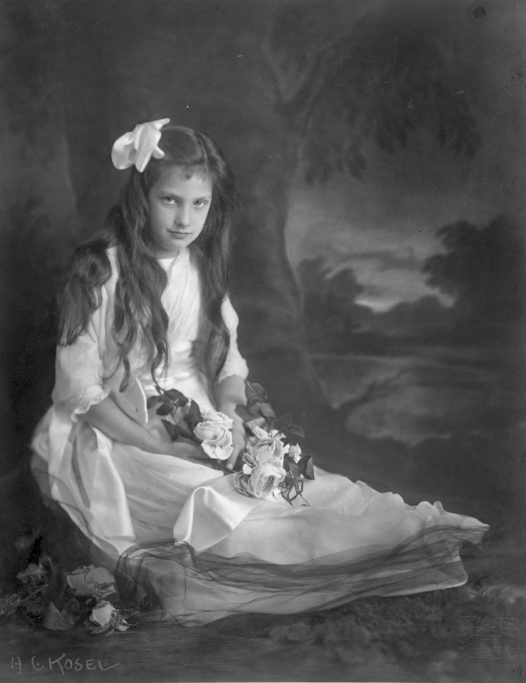
- Assunta in 1912
- Born: 10 August 1902; Vienna, Austria-Hungary
- Died: 24 January 1993 (aged 90); San Antonio, Texas, U.S.
- Spouse: Joseph Hopfinger (m. 1939; div. 1950)
- Issue: Maria Teresa Hopfinger; Juliet Elisabeth Hopfinger
Names
- German: Assunta Alice Ferdinandine Blanca Leopoldina Margarethe Beatrix Raphaela Michaela Philomena
- House: Habsburg-Tuscany
- Father: Archduke Leopold Salvator of Austria
- Mother: Princess Blanca of Bourbon

Archduchess Assunta of Austria German: Assunta, Erzherzogin von Österreich-Toskana; (10 August 1902 – 24 January 1993) was the youngest daughter of Archduke Leopold Salvator of Austria and Princess Blanca of Bourbon. She was a member of the Tuscan branch of the Imperial House of Habsburg-Lorraine, an Archduchess of Austria and Princess of Tuscany by birth. Born and raised in the twilight years of the Habsburg monarchy, Archduchess Assunta lived in exile in Barcelona, Spain, after the dissolution of Austria-Hungary. She entered religious life in a convent there, but was forced to leave it in 1936 due to disturbances during the Spanish Civil War. In 1939, she married Joseph Hopfinger, a Polish doctor. In 1942, the couple emigrated to the United States. Archduchess Assunta and her husband had two daughters, but they divorced in 1950. She moved to San Antonio, Texas, where she had a variety of jobs living in anonymity until her death.

== Early life ==
Archduchess Assunta of Austria was born on 10 August 1902 in Vienna, Austria. She was the eighth of ten children of Archduke Leopold Salvator of Austria (1863–1931) and his wife Princess Blanca of Bourbon (1868–1949). She was given the baptismal names Assunta Alice Ferdinandine Blanca Leopoldina Margarethe Beatrix Raphaela Michaela Philomena.

Archduchess Assunta grew up in the last period of the Habsburg monarchy. She was raised with her many brothers and sisters in the various properties owned by her parents enjoying a comfortable and privileged life. Their main residence was the Palais Toskana in the district of Wieden in Viena with Schloss Wilhelminenberg, on the Eastern slopes of the Gallitzinberg, in the Wienerwald Western parts of the Austrian capital as their country estate. Vacations were spent near Viareggio, Italy where Infanta Blanca owned, la Tenuta Reale, a rural property. Theirs was a multicultural household as Assunta's paternal ancestors had reigned in Austria, Tuscany and the Kingdom of the Two Sicilies. Her maternal family had reigned in Spain, Parma, Modena, Portugal and France. The youngest of five sisters, Archduchess Assunta was raised paired with her sister Archduchess Maria Antonia.

== Exile ==
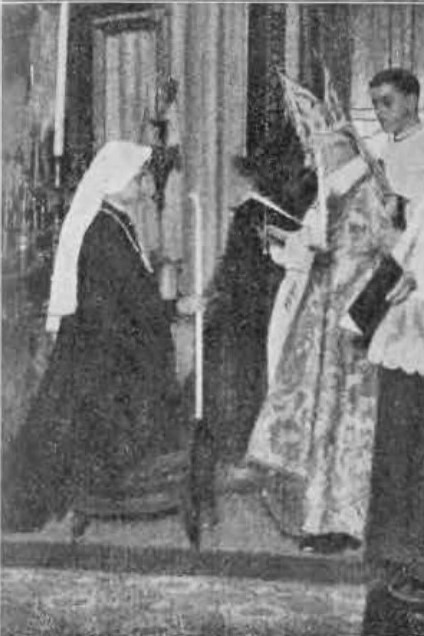
Assunta taking novitiate vows, 1926

Archduchess Assunta was sixteen years old at the fall of Habsburg monarchy following the end of World War I, which marked a sharpdown turn in her family's prosperity. The republican government of Austria confiscated the properties of the Habsburgs, and the family lost their entire fortune. Assunta's eldest brothers, Archdukes Rainer and Leopold, remained in Austria and recognized the new republic, while the rest of the family moved to Spain in January 1919. They settled in Barcelona, living with simplicity as they had limited means. Assunta's three elder sisters, Archduchesses Dolores, Inmaculata and Margaretha, were pliable; Archduchesses Assunta and Maria Antonia were more rebellious and clashed often with their mother Infanta Blanca.

While living in Barcelona, Assunta, following in the footsteps of her sister, Maria Antonia, turned increasingly towards religion. Although their parents were observant Catholics, they found their youngest daughter's religious fervor worrisome. Archduchess Maria Antonia abandoned her desire to become a nun and married an impoverished Majorcan aristocrat, but Assunta remained adamant in her determination to become a nun. After running away on a ship to South America, Assunta, still a minor, was returned to her parents who relented their opposition. With their permission, she eventually entered the convent of Santa Teresa de Tortosa near Barcelona. At the outbreak of the Spanish Civil War, the convent was attacked and the nuns were forced to flee for their lives. Those like Assunta, who had not yet taken their final vows, were free to follow a secular life. Assunta obtained permission to leave her order and joined her mother and unmarried siblings who were then living in Viareggio. In the late 1930s, through one of her brothers, Archduchess Assunta met Joseph Hopfinger (1905–1992), a Jewish Polish doctor. Against her mother's opposition, they married in September 1939 at Ouchy, Switzerland. Shortly after, her husband was called to service in the army until the fall of France when he was demobilized. They were reunited in London and moved to Barcelona where their eldest daughter, Teresa, was born in December 1940.

== Later life ==
The German persecution of the Jews compelled Assunta, her husband, and their infant daughter to leave Europe. Both of her husband's parents were killed by the Russians, as their property was within the mineral-rich region of modern-day Lviv, Ukraine. As her husband was Jewish, they decided to emigrate to the United States with the help of Assunta's brothers Leopold and Franz Joseph, who were living in America and paid for their trip to New York. Assunta's husband worked as a doctor, and a second daughter was born in New York City in 1942.

Archduchess Assunta had two daughters from her marriage to Joseph Hopfinger:

- Maria Teresa Hopfinger b. 5 Dec 1940 ∞ (1961–1967) Edward Joseph Hetsko, Jr ∞ (1969–1970) Anatole Ferlet. She had two children.
- Juliet Elisabeth Maria Assunta Hopfinger b. 30 Oct 1942. Married five times. She had three children.

However, the marriage was not a success. Having married a European princess, Assunta's husband had hoped to inherit a fortune from his wife. As this never materialized, he became disenchanted with the marriage. The couple separated after the war, divorcing on 25 July 1950.

Archduchess Assunta moved with her daughters to San Antonio, Texas, where she lived for the rest of her life. She remained very attached to the Catholic Church and held a variety of jobs to support herself and her two young children, including for some time working as a claim clerk. Late in her life, she made one trip to Europe to visit her surviving siblings. She died on 24 January 1993 at age 90 in San Antonio, Texas.

== Ancestry ==
Ancestors of Archduchess Assunta of Austria

16. Ferdinand III, Grand Duke of Tuscany
8. Leopold II, Grand Duke of Tuscany
17. Princess Luisa of Naples and Sicily
4. Archduke Karl Salvator of Austria
18. Francis I of the Two Sicilies
9. Princess Maria Antonia of the Two Sicilies
19. Infanta Maria Isabella of Spain
2. Archduke Leopold Salvator of Austria
20. Francis I of the Two Sicilies (= 18)
10. Ferdinand II of the Two Sicilies
21. Infanta Maria Isabella of Spain (= 19)
5. Princess Maria Immacolata of Bourbon-Two Sicilies
22. Archduke Charles, Duke of Teschen
11. Archduchess Maria Theresa of Austria
23. Princess Henrietta of Nassau-Weilburg
1. Archduchess Assunta of Austria
24. Infante Carlos María Isidro of Spain
12. Infante Juan, Count of Montizón
25. Infanta Maria Francisca of Portugal
6. Infante Carlos, Duke of Madrid
26. Francis IV, Duke of Modena
13. Archduchess Maria Beatrix of Austria-Este
27. Princess Maria Beatrice of Savoy
3. Infanta Blanca of Spain
28. Charles II, Duke of Parma
14. Charles III, Duke of Parma
29. Princess Maria Teresa of Savoy
7. Princess Margherita of Bourbon-Parma
30. Prince Charles Ferdinand, Duke of Berry
15. Princess Louise of Artois
31. Princess Marie Caroline of Naples and Sicily

== Bibliography ==
- Harding, Bertita. Lost Waltz: A Story of Exile. Bobbs-Merrill, 1944. ASIN: B0007DXCLY
- McIntosh, David. The Archduchess From Texas. The European Royal History Journal. V 7.2, April 2004.
- McIntosh, David. The Unknown Habsburgs. Rosvall Royal Books, 2000. ISBN 91-973978-0-6
