= Archduke Rainer of Austria =

Archduke Rainer of Austria may refer to:

- Archduke Rainer of Austria (1783–1853), eighth son of Emperor Leopold II
- Archduke Rainer of Austria (1827–1913), fourth son of Archduke Rainer (1783–1853)
- Archduke Rainer of Austria (1895–1930), eldest son of Archduke Leopold Salvator
