= Princess Blanca of Bourbon =

Archduchess Leopold Salvator of Austria

Blanca of Bourbon
- Archduchess Leopold Salvator of Austria
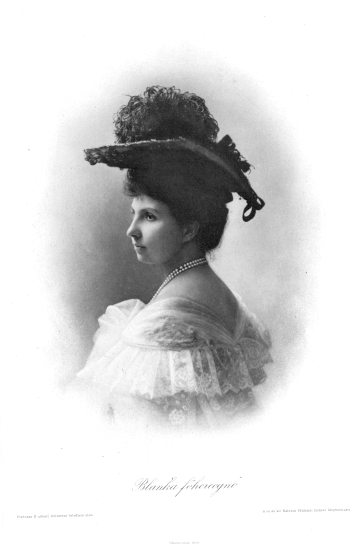

Consort to the pretender to the Croatian throne
- Tenure: 15 September 1919 – 4 September 1931
- Born: 7 September 1868; Graz, Styria, Austria-Hungary
- Died: 25 October 1949 (aged 81); Viareggio, Tuscany, Italy
- Spouse: Archduke Leopold Salvator, Prince of Tuscany (m. 1889; died 1931)
- Issue Detail: Archduchess Dolores; Archduchess Immaculata; Archduchess Margaretha; Archduke Rainer; Archduke Leopold; Archduchess Maria Antonia; Archduke Anton; Archduchess Assunta; Archduke Franz Josef; Archduke Karl Pius
Names
- Blanca de Castilla María de la Concepción Teresa Francisca de Asís Margarita Juana Beatriz Carlota Luisa Fernanda Adelgunda Elvira Ildefonsa Regina Josefa Micaela Gabriela Rafaela de Borbón y Borbón Parma
- House: Bourbon
- Father: Prince Carlos of Bourbon
- Mother: Princess Margherita of Bourbon-Parma
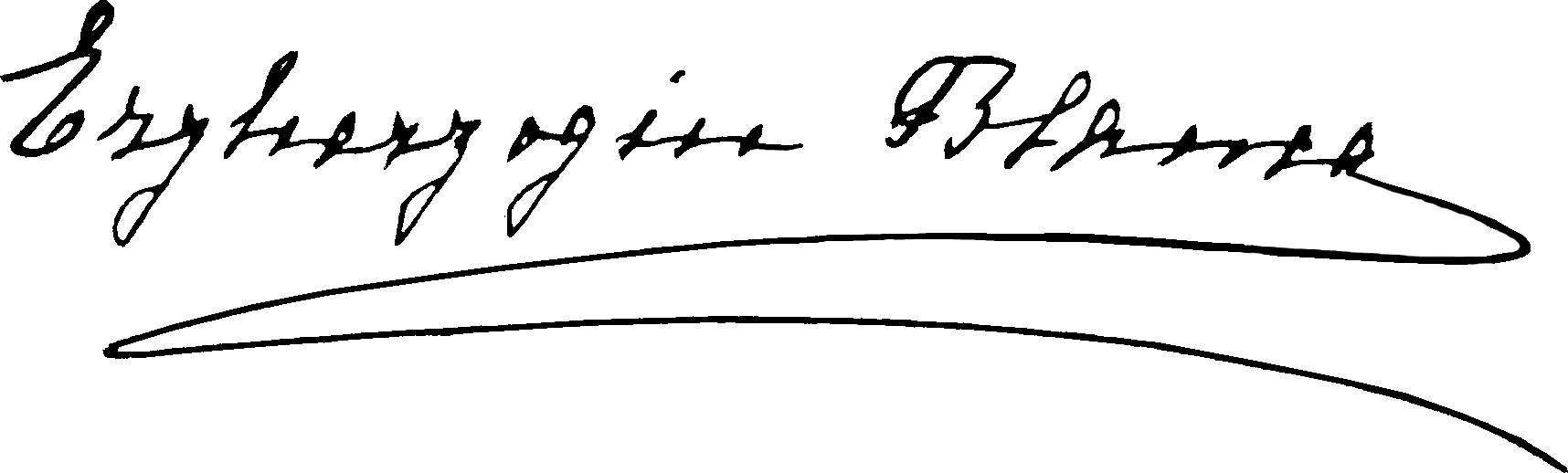
- Signature

Princess Blanca of Bourbon (French: Blanche de Bourbon; 7 September 1868 – 25 October 1949) was the consort of the pretender to the Croatian throne and the wife of Archduke Leopold Salvator. She was a Spanish and French princess by birth, and also became an archduchess by marriage.

As a member of the House of Bourbon and - according to the Carlists and to the Legitimists- an Infanta of Spain and a Fille de France by birth. In 1889, she married Archduke Leopold Salvator of Austria, Prince of Tuscany, with whom she had ten children. The family left Austria after the end of the monarchy and finally settled in Barcelona. When the male line of Blanca's family died out at the death of her uncle, Alfonso Carlos, Duke of Anjou and San Jaime, some of the Carlists recognized her as the legitimate heiress to the Spanish throne.

== Family ==
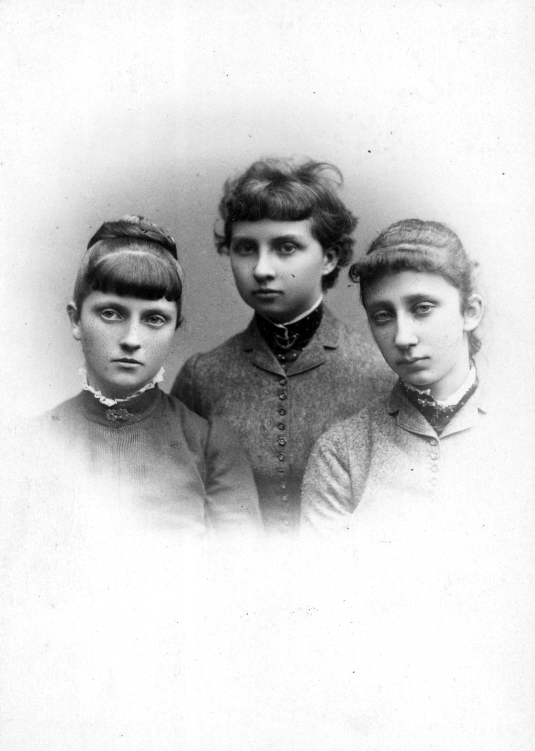
Blanca (centre) with her first cousins Louise (left) and Marie Louise (right).

Blanca was the eldest child of Prince Charles of Bourbon (Don Carlos), and Princess Margherita of Bourbon-Parma. Her father was a great-grandson of King Charles IV of Spain, and the grandson of Infante Carlos, Carlist claimant to the throne of Spain (1788-1855). In 1868, shortly after Blanca's birth, her paternal grandfather, Prince Juan of Bourbon, formally renounced to his "spanish rights" and Blanca's father became the new Carlist claimant to the throne of Spain. At the time of her birth, her mother lived in Graz, near her maternal great-grandmother's castle, Brunsee. Shortly after, the family moved to Paris, then Switzerland. In 1870, Princess Margherita give birth to Prince Jaime in Vevey, Switzerland. The family was expelled from the country some time after Princess Elvira's birth, due to Don Carlos's Carlist activities. Repatriating to France at the end of October 1872, the family took up residence in Paris, with the help of Margherita's uncle, the Count of Chambord. Finally, the family moved to Pau, at the Villa Ader on the Boulevard Alsace-Lorraine.

Meanwhile, Blanca's father, Don Carlos, started the Third Carlist War, in 1872. Blanca's mother became a nurse and was called "L'Ange de la Charité". During this period, Blanca and her siblings were sent to Schloss Frohsdorf, the Count and Countess of Chambord's home. In 1874, Margherita's give birth to Princess Beatrice, and in 1876, to Princess Alice. The same year, the Third Carlist War ended by Don Carlos's defeat. Repatriating to Paris at the end of June 1876, the family took up residence in Passy at the n°49 on the Rue de la Pompe. In 1881 they were expelled from France due to Carlos's political activities. By then Blanca's parents had drifted apart. Her father went to live in his palace in Venice, while her mother retired to Tenuata Reale, an estate in Viareggio, Italy inherited in 1879 from Blanca's great-grandmother, Duchess Maria Teresa of Parma. Blanca and her siblings divided their time between their parents. In 1881 Blanca and her sisters entered the Sacre Coeur, a Catholic school run by nuns in Florence. Blanca played the mandolin and was very fond of horses. In 1883, upon finishing her schooling, she visited Spain incognito with her parents' permission. At her return she was officially introduced to the court in Vienna.

In 1883 the last legitimate prince in the male-line of Louis XV, Henri, Count of Chambord, died childless leaving, in the eyes of French royalists excepting recalcitrant legitimists, the Count of Paris as heir to the Bourbon crown of France. However, the legitimists recognized Blanca's grandfather, Prince Juan of Bourbon, as the rightful King of France and Navarra. In 1887, Juan died and Blanca's father, Don Carlos, became the legitimist pretender to the French throne. At that time, Blanca and her siblings began to describe themselves as children of the King of France, in addition to the title of King of Spain claimed by Don Carlos.

== Marriage and children ==
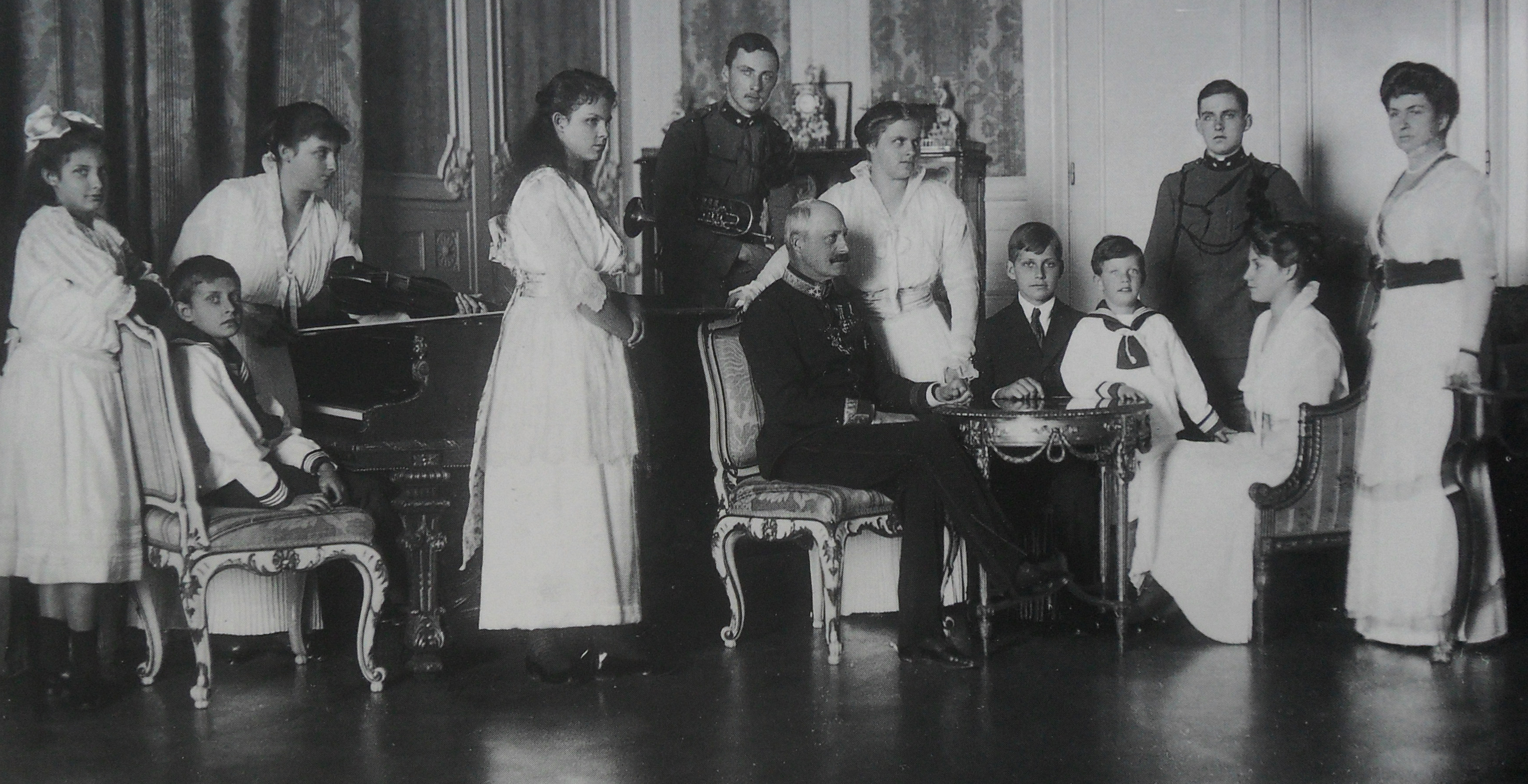
Blanca with her husband and their ten children. From left to right: Archduchess Assunta, Archduke Franz Josef, Archduchess Immaculata, Archduchess Maria Antonia, Archduke Rainier, Archduke Leopold Salvator of Austria, Archduchess Dolores, Archduke Anton, Archduke Karl, Archduke Leopold, Archduchess Margaretha and Blanca. Vienna, 1915.

At the court of the Habsburgs, Blanca, the eldest and the best looking of four sisters, attracted the attention of Archduke Leopold Salvator of Austria, second child and eldest son of Archduke Karl Salvator of Austria and his wife Princess Maria Immaculata of Bourbon-Two Sicilies. They were married on 24 October 1889 at Schloss Frohsdorf in Lanzenkirchen, Lower Austria, Austria. The newlyweds settled in Lemberg, Galicia, then in Agram, Croatia and finally in Vienna, following Archduke Leopold Salvator's military appointments.

Blanca and Leopold Salvator's main residence was the Palais Toskana in Vienna. They also owned Schloss Wilhelminenberg and a rural estate near Viareggio, which Archduchess Blanca inherited from her mother. The marriage was happy and produced ten children:

- Archduchess Dolores of Austria (5 May 1891 – 10 April 1974)
- Archduchess Immaculata of Austria (9 September 1892 – 3 September 1971) ∞ 1932 (morg.) Nobile Igino Neri-Serneri
- Archduchess Margaretha of Austria (8 May 1894 – 21 January 1986) ∞ 1937 (morg.) Ambassador Francesco Maria Taliani de Marchio
- Archduke Rainer of Austria (21 November 1895 – 25 May 1930)
- Archduke Leopold of Austria (30 January 1897 – 14 March 1958) ∞ 1919–1931 (morg.) Baroness Dagmar von Nicolics-Podrinski ∞ 1932 (morg.) Alicia Gibson Coburn
- Archduchess Maria Antonia of Austria (13 July 1899 – 22 October 1977) ∞ 1924 (morg.) Don Ramón de Orlandis y Villalonga (died 1936) ∞ 1942 (morg.) Luis Perez Sucre
- Archduke Anton of Austria (20 March 1901 – 22 October 1987) ∞ 1931–1954 Princess Ileana of Romania
- Archduchess Assunta of Austria (10 August 1902 – 24 January 1993) ∞ 1939–1950 (morg.) Joseph Hopfinger
- Archduke Franz Josef of Austria, Prince of Tuscany (4 February 1905 – 9 May 1975) ∞ 1937–1938 (morg.) Maria Aloisa Baumer ∞ 1962 (morg.) Maria Elena Seunig, Countess de Basus
- Archduke Karl Pius of Austria (4 December 1909 – 24 December 1953) ∞ 1938–1950 (morg.) Christa Satzger de Bálványos

== The Croatian Archduchess ==
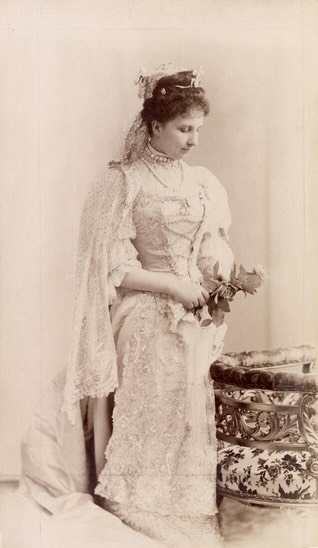
Archduchess Blanca in 1889.

Until World War I, Blanca and her large family had a pleasant uncomplicated existence moving according to the seasons among their various residences. In November 1894, Archduke Leopold Salvator's family moved to Zagreb, Croatia, due to his military occupation. The couple became very popular in Croatia, especially because they learned croatian and started to educate their children as croatian princes. Leopold Salvator was known as one of the strongest supporter of Trialism, he was regularly considered to become the emperor's official representative in Zagreb. Faced with this support, which disturbed Hungary, the archduke was moved from Zagreb to Vienna in 1900. In 1914, Leopold Salvator was the target of an assassination attempt at the Zagreb theatre.

== War-time nurse ==
During World War I her husband took on the provision of food for the Austrian Army in the front and was inspector general of Artillery until 1918. Blanca's two eldest sons also joined the Austrian army fighting in the Italian front, while with her daughters Archduchess Immaculata and Archduchess Margaretha, Blanca worked for the Austrian red cross.

== Titular Queen of Croatia ==
After the war and proclamation of the Republic, the properties of the imperial family were confiscated by the new Austrian government. Wilheminenberg was converted into a military hospital and then sold to a Swiss banker. With the loss of their wealth, they had to live in exile with meager means. The family could live neither in France nor in Italy, countries that had been Austria's enemies during the war. In 1919, a plot to make Croatia an independent kingdom with Archduke Leopold Salvator as king failed. Despite this, Leopold Salvator was proclaimed King of Croatia by the conspirators, even though neither the Archduke nor Blanca had ever taken part in the plot.

Blanca was forced to ask her cousin Alfonso XIII, who belonged to the rival branch of the Spanish Bourbons, for permission to live in Barcelona. Alfonso XIII allowed them to come to Spain on the condition that they did not support the claims to the Spanish throne of Blanca's brother Prince Jaime, Duke of Anjou and Madrid. In 1922 Blanca was recognized as a Spaniard and was also recognized as Princess. Despite that, the exiled family had to live modestly in a house in Barcelona.

== Later life ==
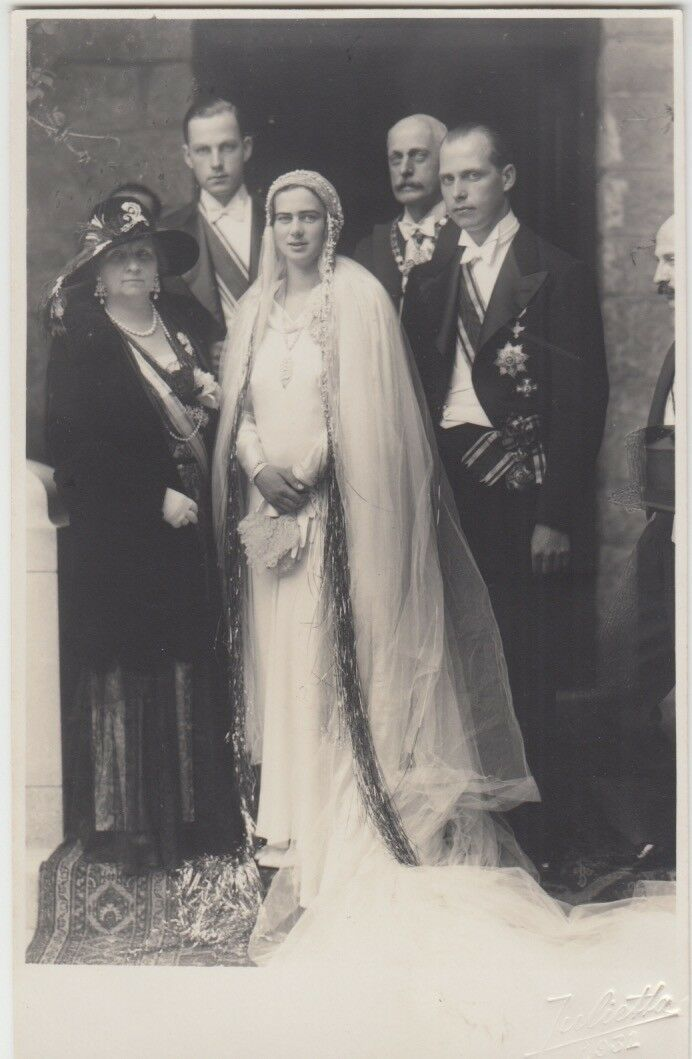
Archduchess Blanca at the wedding of her son Anton, with Princess Ileana of Romania, 1931.

The fall of Alfonso XIII and the proclamation of the Second Spanish Republic in April 1931 did not directly affect their circumstances. However, five months later, Blanca's husband died during a trip to Austria while trying to recover some of their lost properties. Blanca was left under strained economical means, living from vineyards at La Tenuata Reale at Viareggio and from a small rent provided by the Carlist party of Catalonia. Three of her children were still living with her: Dolores, Margaretha and Karl. The convulsed political situation in Spain made them return to Austria.

The family was able to rent three rooms at their former residence in Vienna, the Palais Toskana. In March 1938 Hitler annexed Austria and Blanca with her children Dolores and Karl moved to her property in Viareggio.

== Carloctavismo ==
In early 1935 a minoritarian branch of Carlism, the so-called “Cruzadistas” later to be named Carloctavistas, staged a grand meeting in Zaragoza; the gathering adopted a declaration that Doña Blanca was in position to transmit legitimate monarchical hereditary rights from her father, the Carlist king Carlos VII, to her sons. During the following 14 years her position on the issue kept changing and her stand falls into 4 different periods;

- in 1935, when Blanca’s paternal uncle and at the time the Carlist claimant to the throne Don Alfonso Carlos promptly disauthorised the Zaragoza gathering, she publicly distanced herself from the enterprise
- in May 1936, after Don Alfonso Carlos had decided to sort the succession issue by appointing a distant relative, Javier de Borbón-Parma, the future regent, Blanca issued a new statement; she declared that after the future death of her uncle, she would accept her hereditary rights to transmit them to her youngest son
- in 1940 she declared full loyalty to the regent Don Javier; the declaration did not amount to explicit renouncement of her hereditary claims, but implicitly suggested that they were at least parked or otherwise suspended
- in May 1943 she reverted to her 1936 stand and claimed first assuming and then transmitting heritage rights to her youngest son As he declared himself the legitimate Carlist heir a month later, Doña Blanca effectively supported his cause until her death.

She died, aged 81, in Viareggio, Tuscany, Italy.

== Ancestry ==
Ancestors of Princess Blanca of Bourbon

8. Infante Carlos María Isidro of Spain
4. Prince Juan, Count of Montizón
9. Infanta Maria Francisca of Portugal
2. Prince Carlos, Duke of Madrid
10. Francis IV, Duke of Modena
5. Archduchess Maria Beatrix of Austria-Este
11. Princess Maria Beatrice of Savoy
1. Blanca of Bourbon
12. Charles II, Duke of Parma
6. Charles III, Duke of Parma
13. Princess Maria Teresa of Savoy
3. Princess Margherita of Bourbon-Parma
14. Prince Charles Ferdinand, Duke of Berry
7. Princess Louise of France
15. Princess Maria Carolina of Naples and Sicily

== Notes ==
Princess Blanca of Bourbon House of Bourbon Born: 2 September 1868 Died: 25 October 1949
Royal titles
Preceded by Zita of Bourbon-Parma	Queen consort of Croatia; 15 September 1919 – 4 September 1931	Marie of Romania
