= Archduke Leopold of Austria, Prince of Tuscany =

Archduke Leopold
- Mr Leopold Lorraine
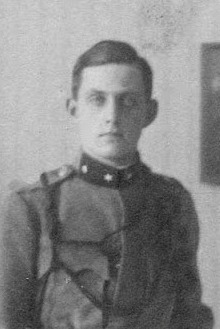
- Archduke Leopold in 1914
- Born: 30 January 1897; Zagreb, Kingdom of Croatia-Slavonia, Empire of Austria
- Died: 14 March 1958 (aged 61); Willimantic, Connecticut, U.S.
- Spouse: Baroness Dagmar Nicolics-Podinje, Baroness of Wolfenau (m. 1919; div. 1931) Alice Coburn (m. 1932; div. 1934)
- Issue: Gabrielle von Habsburg, Countess of Wolfenau
- House: Habsburg-Tuscany
- Father: Archduke Leopold Salvator of Austria
- Mother: Princess Blanca of Bourbon

Archduke Leopold Maria of Austria, Prince of Tuscany (German: Leopold, Erzherzog von Österreich-Toskana, 30 January 1897 – 14 March 1958) was the second son of Archduke Leopold Salvator, Prince of Tuscany and Archduchess Blanca. At the fall of Habsburg monarchy he remained in Austria and recognized the new republic in order to marry outside the circle of European royal and princely dynasties. Leopold emigrated to the United States where he became a naturalized American citizen under the name Leopold Lorraine. He died in 1958 in Connecticut.

== Life ==
Archduke Leopold of Austria was born in Agram (the historic Austrian-German name for what is now the city of Zagreb in Croatia), the fifth child and second son of Archduke Leopold Salvator of Austria, Prince of Tuscany and Princess Blanca of Bourbon (daughter of Carlos, Duke of Madrid). He received the names Leopold Maria Alfons Blanka Karl Anton Beatrix Michael Joseph Peter Ignatz von Habsburg-Lothringen.

During World War I Archduke Leopold served as a lieutenant of artillery in the Austro-Hungarian Army with his eldest brother Archduke Rainier. His actions, on 25 May 1917, as an officer at the Battle of Medeazza, near Trieste in Italy, were favorably noted. At the age of 19, he was the last person appointed to the Order of the Golden Fleece by Emperor Karl. Archduke Leopold also took part in the first line of combat in the Battle of the Piave River.

After the fall of the Habsburg Monarchy and the establishment of the First Austrian Republic, he renounced his rights to the Austrian throne in order that he could remain in Austria. He was in love with Baroness Dagmar Nicolics-Podrinska (Zagreb 15 July 1898 – Lausanne 15 November 1967), a member of the minor Croatian nobility. His parents were initially against the marriage as Dagmar did not belong to a royal family. The wedding took place in Vienna on 12 April 1919. Theirs was a morganatic marriage. Dagmar received the title of Baroness von Wolfenau. The couple had one daughter :

- Gabrielle of Habsburg-Lorraine (Vienna 15 May 1921 – Zürich 1996) (created Countess of Wolfenau in 1922), who married Johannes von der Mühll (1918 – 1977), a Swiss banker, in 1948 and had two daughters and a son in Switzerland before her divorce in 1958.

Through his mother, after the death in 1931 of his uncle Jaime, Duke of Madrid, Leopold was an heir to the Carlist claims to the throne of Spain, but having given up his aristocratic status upon his morganatic marriage in 1919, he renounced the claims in favour his youngest brother, Archduke Karl Pius of Austria (Vienna 4 December 1909 – Barcelona 24 December 1953), but took them up again after his brother's death.

In 1930 Archduke Leopold was approached by a pair calling themselves "Colonel Townsend" and "Princess Baronti", who asked him to vouch for their identities to Infanta Maria Theresa of Portugal, the sister-in-law of the Emperor Franz Joseph I of Austria. They were looking to set themselves up as brokers for the Napoleon Diamond Necklace, a family heirloom that Maria Theresa had been attempting to sell for several years. Leopold agreed, on condition that he be paid $20,000 from the eventual sale of the necklace. Townsend and Baronti sold the necklace for a pittance of $60,000 to its assessed value of $400,000, and remitted only $7,270 of the sale back to Maria Theresa. The resulting legal action and public scandal saw Leopold indicted for aiding and abetting the fraud, and with theft of the proceeds of the sale. After turning himself in, he spent twelve days in The Tombs, a detention complex in Manhattan, before a neighbour posted his bail bond. He was eventually acquitted of the first charge, and had his conviction on the second count vacated.

After divorcing his wife in 1931, Leopold emigrated to the United States where he was known as "Mr. Leopold H(absburg) Lorraine". In 1932 he remarried, also morganatically, Alicia Gibson Coburn (New York 20 January 1898 – New York City 25 August 1960). Their marriage remained childless and ended in divorce.

For a time Leopold sought a career in Hollywood and had several minor roles, including John Ford's 1928 drama Four Sons. He moved to Willimantic, Connecticut where he settled into a small house with his second wife and spent the rest of his life as a factory worker. He became an American citizen in 1953. His ashes are in tomb 91 of the Imperial Crypt in Vienna.

== Ancestry ==
Ancestors of Archduke Leopold of Austria, Prince of Tuscany

8. Leopold II, Grand Duke of Tuscany
4. Archduke Karl Salvator of Austria, Prince of Tuscany
9. Princess Maria Antonia of the Two Sicilies
2. Archduke Leopold Salvator, Prince of Tuscany
10. Ferdinand II of the Two Sicilies
5. Princess Maria Immaculata of Bourbon-Two Sicilies
11. Maria Theresa of Austria
1. Archduke Leopold of Austria, Prince of Tuscany
12. Juan, Count of Montizón
6. Carlos, Duke of Madrid
13. Archduchess Maria Beatrix of Austria-Este
3. Infanta Blanca of Spain
14. Charles III, Duke of Parma
7. Princess Margherita of Bourbon-Parma
15. Princess Louise Marie Thérèse of France
