= Archduchess Dolores of Austria =

Archduchess of Austria

Archduchess Dolores
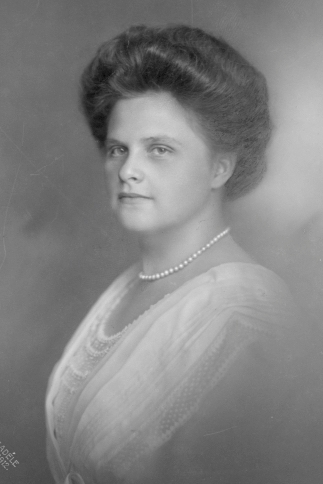
- Dolores in 1912
- Born: 5 May 1891; Lemberg, Kingdom of Galicia and Lodomeria, Austria-Hungary
- Died: 10 April 1974 (aged 82); Viareggio, Italy
Names
- German: Maria de los Dolores Beatrix Carolina Blanca Leopoldina
- House: Habsburg-Tuscany
- Father: Archduke Leopold Salvator of Austria
- Mother: Princess Blanca of Bourbon

Archduchess Dolores of Austria (German: Dolores Erzherzogin von Österreich-Toskana; 5 May 1891 – 10 April 1974) was a daughter of Archduke Leopold Salvator of Austria. She was member of the Tuscan branch of the Imperial House of Habsburg-Lorraine, an Archduchess of Austria and Princess of Tuscany by birth. After the dissolution of Austria-Hungary, she lived under reduced circumstances with her family in Spain, Austria, and Italy. She died unmarried.

== Early life ==
Archduchess Dolores was born in Lemberg, Austria-Hungary, the eldest child of Archduke Leopold Salvator of Austria (1863–1931) and of his wife Princess Blanca of Bourbon (1868–1949). Her mother was the eldest daughter of Carlos, Duke of Madrid, Carlist claimant to the throne of Spain. Dolores was given the baptismal names Maria Dolores Beatriz Carolina Margherita Blanca Leopoldina Pia Anna Josefina Raphaela Michaela Jeronima Ignacia Stanislas Sixtus Cecilia Camino Georgina Barbaravon Habsburg-Lothringen. According to her aunt Princess Beatrice of Bourbon, Dolores was desinated to marry her first cousin once removed Prince Sixtus of Bourbon-Parma.

Archduchess Dolores grew up in the last period of the Austrian-Hungarian Empire. She was educated in splendor. Her father, who had followed a career in the Austro-Hungarian Army, was also an inventor with a number of military patents under his name. Her mother was the domineering force in the family. Theirs was a multi-cultural household. Dolores's paternal ancestors had reigned in Austria, Tuscany and the Kingdom of the Two Sicilies. Her mother's family had reigned in Spain, Parma and France.

Archduchess Dolores was educated with her sisters Immaculata and Margaretha. The three sisters, very close in age, were artistically inclined. Dolores was particularity skillful at drawing. Her education emphasised languages, and in addition to her native German, she learned French, Spanish, Hungarian and Italian. The family was wealthy. They owned the Palais Toskana in Vienna and Schloss Wilhelminenberg as their country estate. Vacations were spent in Italy where Infanta Blanca owned a rural property near Viareggio. During World War I, Archduchess Dolores's father and two eldest brothers fought with the Austro-Hungarian army.

== Exile ==
At the fall of Habsburg monarchy, the republican government of Austria confiscated all the properties of the Habsburgs. Dolores' family lost all their fortune. Her two eldest brothers, Archdukes Rainer and Leopold, decided to remain in Austria and recognized the new republic. Dolores with her parents and her other siblings emigrated to Spain. In January 1919 they arrived in Barcelona where they settled for over a decade. They lived modestly. While in Wilhelminenberg the family employed no less than 80 servants to attend their large household, by contrast in Barcelona, Dolores her mother and sisters had to fend for themselves doing the house chores. With income from her father's military patents in France and with the sale of some of her mother jewels they were able to buy a house in Barcelona. Archduchess Dolores remained unmarried. She was mildly handicapped by a limp since childhood.

The convulsed political situation in Spain during the Second Spanish Republic made the family return to Austria. They were able to rent three rooms at their former residence in Vienna, the Palais Toskana. In March 1938 Hitler annexed Austria and Archduchess Dolores with her mother and youngest brother moved to Tenuta Reale, a villa belonging to his mother's family near Viareggio in Italy. As the situation there became increasingly dire due to the war, Archduchess Dolores her mother, her youngest brother, Archduke Karl, and his family moved back to Barcelona. When the war ended they returned to Viareggio.

After the death of her mother, Archduchess Dolores returned to live in Barcelona. In the 1960s her family lost contact with her. It was later discovered that she was living in Lleida being held in semi imprisonment by the family of the postman who used to deliver her letters. They were trying to get hold on her inheritance. Rescued by her sister Margaretha, Dolores remained at Tenuta Reale for the rest of her life living with her sisters Margaretha and Immaculata who were by then widows. She died on 10 April 1974 at age 82 at Viareggio, Italy.

== Ancestry ==
Ancestors of Archduchess Dolores of Austria

8. Leopold II, Grand Duke of Tuscany
4. Archduke Karl Salvator of Austria
9. Princess Maria Antonia of the Two Sicilies
2. Archduke Leopold Salvator of Austria
10. Ferdinand II of the Two Sicilies
5. Princess Maria Immaculata of Bourbon-Two Sicilies
11. Maria Theresa of Austria
1. Archduchess Dolores of Austria, Princess of Tuscany
12. Juan III of Spain (Carlist)
6. Carlos VII of Spain (Carlist)
13. Archduchess Maria Beatrix of Austria-Este
3. Infanta Blanca of Spain
14. Charles III, Duke of Parma
7. Princess Margherita of Bourbon-Parma
15. Princess Louise Marie Thérèse of Artois

== Bibliography ==
- Harding, Bertita. Lost Waltz: A Story of Exile. Bobbs-Merrill, 1944. ASIN: B0007DXCLY
- McIntosh, David. The Unknown Habsburgs. Rosvall Royal Books, 2000, ISBN 91-973978-0-6
- Mateos Sainz de Medrano, Ricardo. An Unconventional Family. Royalty Digest N 37 July 1994.
