= Archduke Anton of Austria =

Austrian nobleman and pretender to the Spanish throne

Archduke Anton
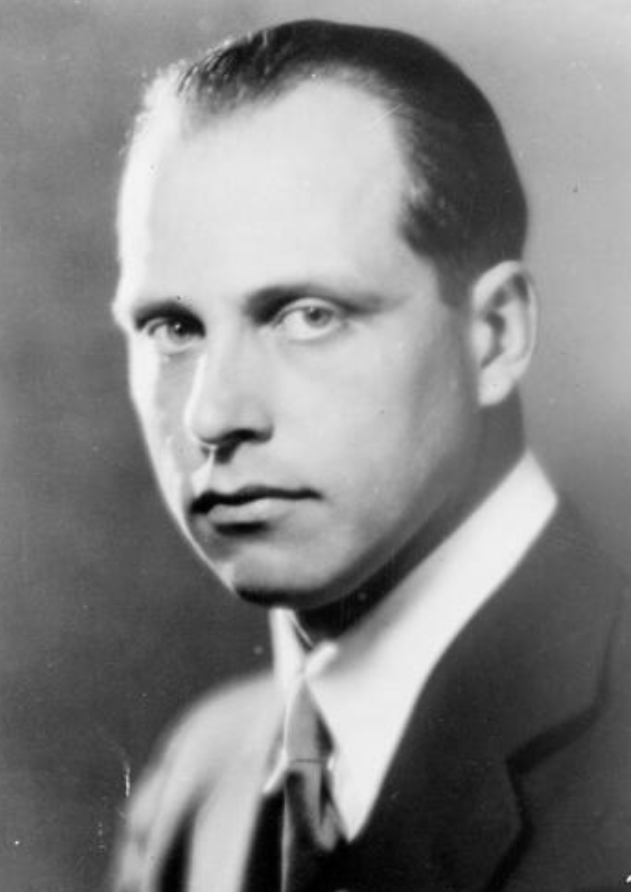
- Archduke Anton in 1931

Carlist-Carloctavismo claimant to the Spanish throne
- Pretense: 24 December 1953 – 1961
- Predecessor: Archduke Karl Pius of Austria, Prince of Tuscany
- Successor: Archduke Franz Josef of Austria, Prince of Tuscany
- Born: 20 March 1901; Vienna, Empire of Austria
- Died: 22 October 1987 (aged 86); Salzburg, State of Salzburg, Republic of Austria
- Burial: Cemetery on the Mondsee
- Spouse: Princess Ileana of Romania (m. 1931; div. 1954)
- Issue: 6, including Dominic
Names
- Don Antonio María Francisco Leopoldo Blanca Carlos José Ignacio Miguel Margarita Nicetas de Habsburgo-Lorena y de Borbón and Anton Maria Franz Leopold Blanka Karl Joseph Ignaz Raphael Michael Margareta Nicetas von Habsburg-Lothringen, Erzherzog von Österreich, Prinz von Toskana
- House: Habsburg-Lorraine
- Father: Archduke Leopold Salvator of Austria, Prince of Tuscany
- Mother: Princess Blanca of Bourbon
- Religion: Roman Catholic

Archduke Anton of Austria, Prince of Tuscany (Anton Maria Franz Leopold Blanka Karl Joseph Ignaz Raphael Michael Margareta Nicetas von Habsburg-Lothringen; Vienna, 20 March 1901 – Salzburg, 22 October 1987) was a possible Carlist-Carloctavismo pretender to the Spanish throne and an Archduke of Austria by birth.

== Early life and ancestry ==
In 1919, all titles of nobility and royalty were prohibited and outlawed in Austria (while in Hungary they were restored in 1927 and the aristocratic House of Magnates continued until 1945). Being a member of the Tuscany branch of the House of Habsburg, Anton was the seventh of ten children born to Archduke Leopold Salvator of Austria, Prince of Tuscany and his wife, Princess Blanca of Bourbon, the eldest daughter of Infante Carlos, Duke of Madrid.

== Marriage and issue ==
After being introduced by King Carol II of Romania, he and Princess Ileana of Romania (1909–1991) were married in Sinaia on 26 July 1931.

They had the following children:

- Stefan (1932–1998), naturalized US citizen (1954), married Jerrine Soper (1931–2015) in 1954, with issue.
- Maria Ileana (1933–1959), married Count Jaroslav Kottulinsky, Freiherr von Kottulin (1917–1959) in 1957, with issue.
- Alexandra (born 1935), married Eugen Eberhard, Duke of Württemberg (1930–2022) in 1962, divorced in 1972 and annulled at Rome in 1973, with no issue; married Baron Victor von Baillou (1931–2023) in 1973, with no issue.
- Dominic von Habsburg (born 1937), married Engel von Voss (1937–2010) in 1960 and divorced in 1999, with issue; married Emmanuella Mlynarski (born 1948) in 1999, with no issue.
- Maria Magdalena (1939–2021), married Baron Hans Ulrich von Holzhausen (born 1929) in 1959, with issue.
- Elisabeth (1942–2019), married Dr. Friedrich Sandhofer (born in 1934) in 1964, with issue.

== World War II and later life ==
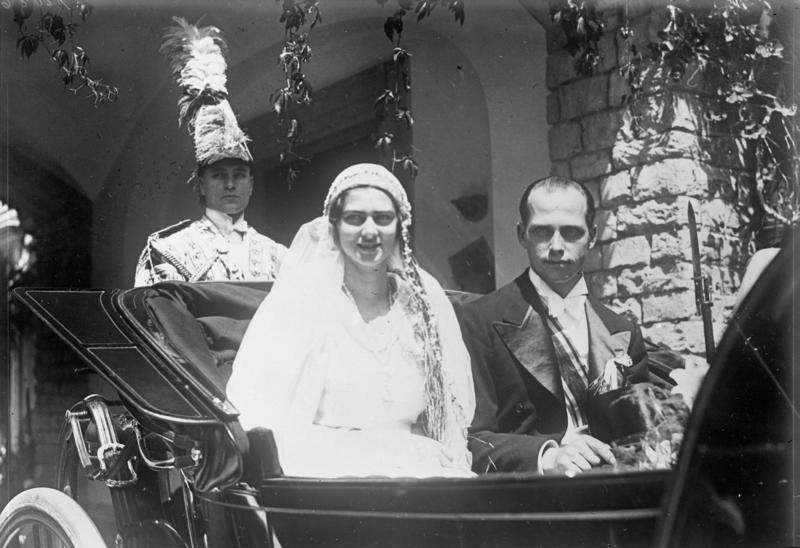
The Archduke on his wedding day

In the Second World War, he served until late 1944 in the German Wehrmacht as a pilot. He was conscripted in the fall of 1938, at the time of the Sudeten Crisis, missing the birth of his daughter Maria Magdalena. After leaving the military, he moved to Bran, where he and his family lived in the Bran Castle. After the coup d'état, and the end of Romania's alliance with Germany on 23 August 1944, the family and their servants were in danger of being interned or thrown out of the country, as German citizens. It was only when King Michael I abdicated on 30 December 1947 and was forced to leave the country that Archduke Anton's family also went into exile. The family spent some time in Switzerland, then in Argentina, then lived in the early 1950s in the United States.

The marriage ended in divorce, made official on 29 May 1954. While Ileana became a nun, Archduke Anton moved to Austria, where he lived until his death in Emmerberg and in St. Lorenz am Mondsee in the Villa Minola. He died on 22 October 1987 at the age of 86. He was buried at the cemetery on the Mondsee.

== Ancestry ==
Ancestors of Archduke Anton of Austria

8. Leopold II, Grand Duke of Tuscany
4. Archduke Karl Salvator of Austria, Prince of Tuscany
9. Princess Maria Antonia of the Two Sicilies
2. Archduke Leopold Salvator, Prince of Tuscany
10. Ferdinand II of the Two Sicilies
5. Princess Maria Immaculata of Bourbon-Two Sicilies
11. Maria Theresa of Austria
1. Archduke Anton of Austria, Prince of Tuscany
12. Juan, Count of Montizón
6. Carlos, Duke of Madrid
13. Archduchess Maria Beatrix of Austria-Este
3. Infanta Blanca of Spain
14. Charles III, Duke of Parma
7. Princess Margherita of Bourbon-Parma
15. Princess Louise Marie Thérèse of France
