= Carloctavismo =

1940s-50s Spanish monarchist movement

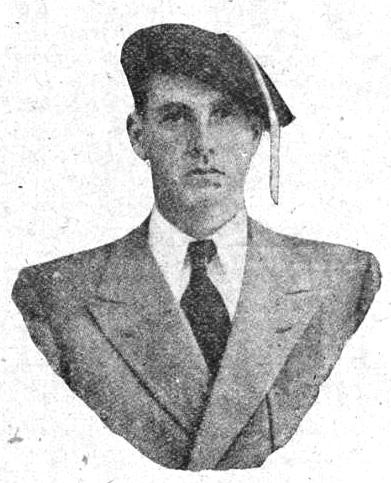
Carlos VIII

Carloctavismo (Spanish: [kaɾloɣtaˈβismo]; the name appears also as carlosoctavismo, carlooctavismo, carlos-octavismo, carlo-octavismo, or octavismo) is a branch of Carlism, particularly active in the 1943–1953 period. In terms of dynastical allegiances it advanced the claim to the Spanish throne of Carlos Pio de Habsburgo-Lorena y de Borbón, styled as Carlos VIII, and his relatives. In terms of political line it collaborated very closely with Francoism.

== Antecedents (1932–1943) ==
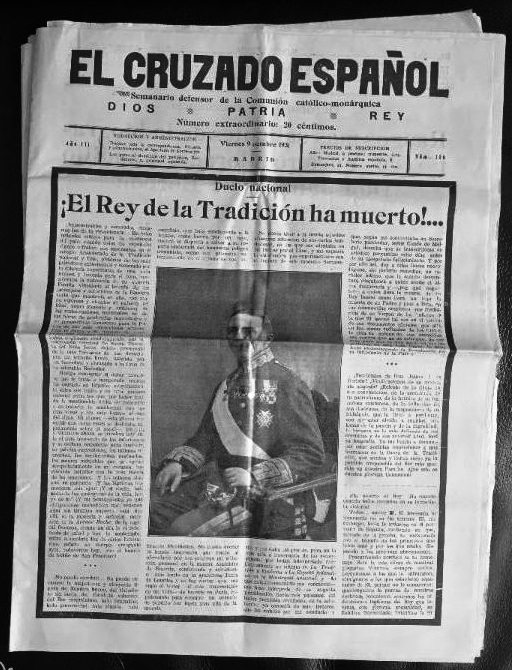
El Cruzado Español

During a hundred years of its history Carlism was headed by six successive claimants with clear heritage rights; however, in the early 1930s it was evident that the dynasty would soon extinguish. The pretender, Don Alfonso Carlos, was 82 when assuming the claim in 1931 and had no issue. For the first time ever the Carlists were neither clear who would be their next king nor how the issue was to be tackled. Don Alfonso Carlos seemed leaning towards a compromise with the Alfonsists, engineered though not sealed by his predecessor, Don Jaime. Such a perspective triggered protests; the dissenting Carlists claimed that a compromise with the liberal Borbón branch would be an insult to generations of their forefathers, who fought and died to topple the hated dynasty.

A Madrid Jaimista weekly El Cruzado Español was since late 1931 among the most outspoken opponents of dynastical compromise. It advocated appointing an heir during Don Alfonso Carlos’ lifetime; initially the focus was on Renato de Borbón-Parma. Headed by an ex-combatant of the Third Carlist War Juan Pérez Najera, in February 1932 the group presented their cause in a letter to the claimant, who received them at a meeting in Toulouse but refused to bow to any pressure. The Cruzadistas, as they were already known, changed their strategy; though initially they seemed to rely on their king for nominating his heir, they began to call for a grand Carlist assembly, which would settle the issue. They did not propone any specific candidate openly and in a pamphlet by a mid-age military lawyer colonel Jesús Cora y Lira they merely laid out the basics of their reading of the succession law; however, they were already in touch with the oldest daughter of the charismatic Carlist king Carlos VII, Doña Blanca, setting their sights on her youngest son, Barcelona-resident Carlos Pio, referred to as Don Carlos. In 1933 the Cruzadistas suffered two major setbacks. Carlos Pio, following brief incarceration related to the Sanjurjo coup, moved from Spain to Vienna. Don Alfonso Carlos, tired of constant pressure, expulsed the Cruzadistas group and in 1934 convinced his grandnephew to acknowledge having no succession rights. Nevertheless, the expulsed were now free to act; having formed a group with a challenging name Núcleo de la Lealtad, in early 1935 they staged a meeting in Zaragoza. It was styled as a Magna Asamblea advocated earlier; though in private many Carlists might have sympathized with their goals, formally the gathering represented a minor offshoot grouping. It adopted a declaration that Doña Blanca was in position to transmit legitimate hereditary rights to her sons. She publicly distanced herself from the enterprise, but her position changed when in January 1936 Don Alfonso Carlos eventually decided to sort the succession issue by appointing a distant relative, Javier de Borbón-Parma, a future regent. In May 1936 Doña Blanca issued a non-compatible statement declaring that after the death of her uncle, she would accept her hereditary rights to transmit them to her youngest son.

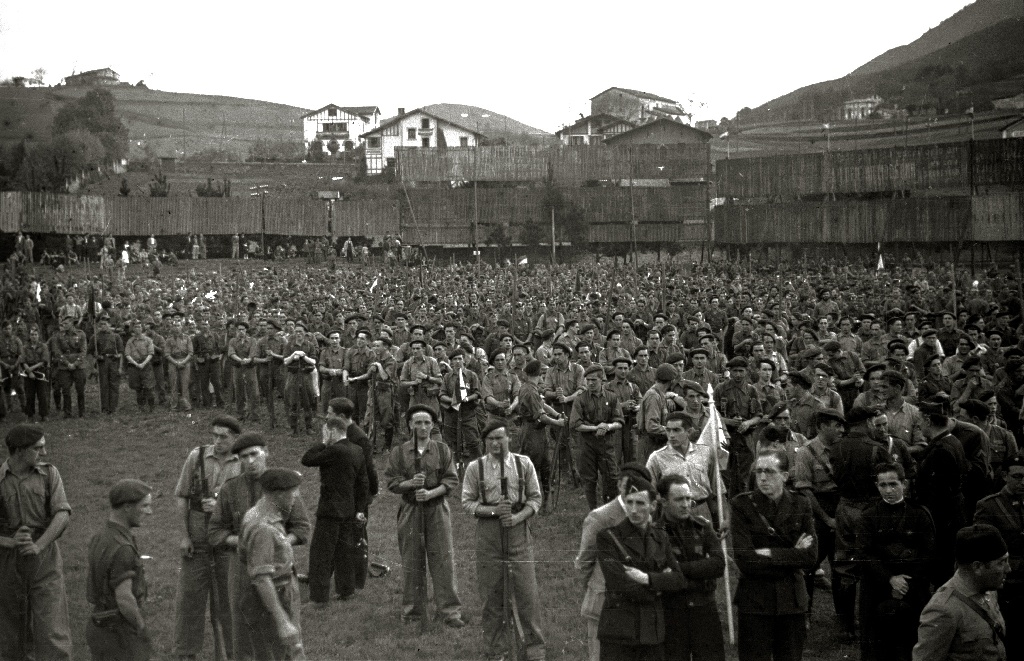
Gathering of Requeté combatants, Tolosa 1937

When the Civil War broke out Cruzadistas were re-admitted to Comunión Tradicionalista. Nevertheless, some Carlist requetés—nominally loyal to Don Alfonso Carlos and after his death in September 1936 to the regent Don Javier - referred to Carlos Pio as to the future king Carlos VIII and used his name as their battle cry. Don Carlos sought permission of his granduncle to enlist to Carlist troops, but was explicitly banned from doing so; later approaches directly to Franco produced only polite refusal. After 1937 Carlos Pio and the Cruzadistas alike refrained from political activity, with key issue on Carlist agenda having been defense of own identity against the Francoist pressure to amalgamate within a new state party. After the 1939 Nationalist victory the former Cruzadista supporters raised their voice again, but in 1940 Doña Blanca declared loyalty to the regent and ignored her 1936 commitment. However, instead of dying out the issue got reinvigorated. At that time what looked like a typical dynastical dispute overlapped with political fragmentation of Carlism, triggered mostly by different views on policy towards Francoism. It soon became evident that many Carlists skeptical about intransigent opposition, mounted by Don Javier, started to look to Don Carlos as to a royal alternative.

== Background: Spain in 1943 ==
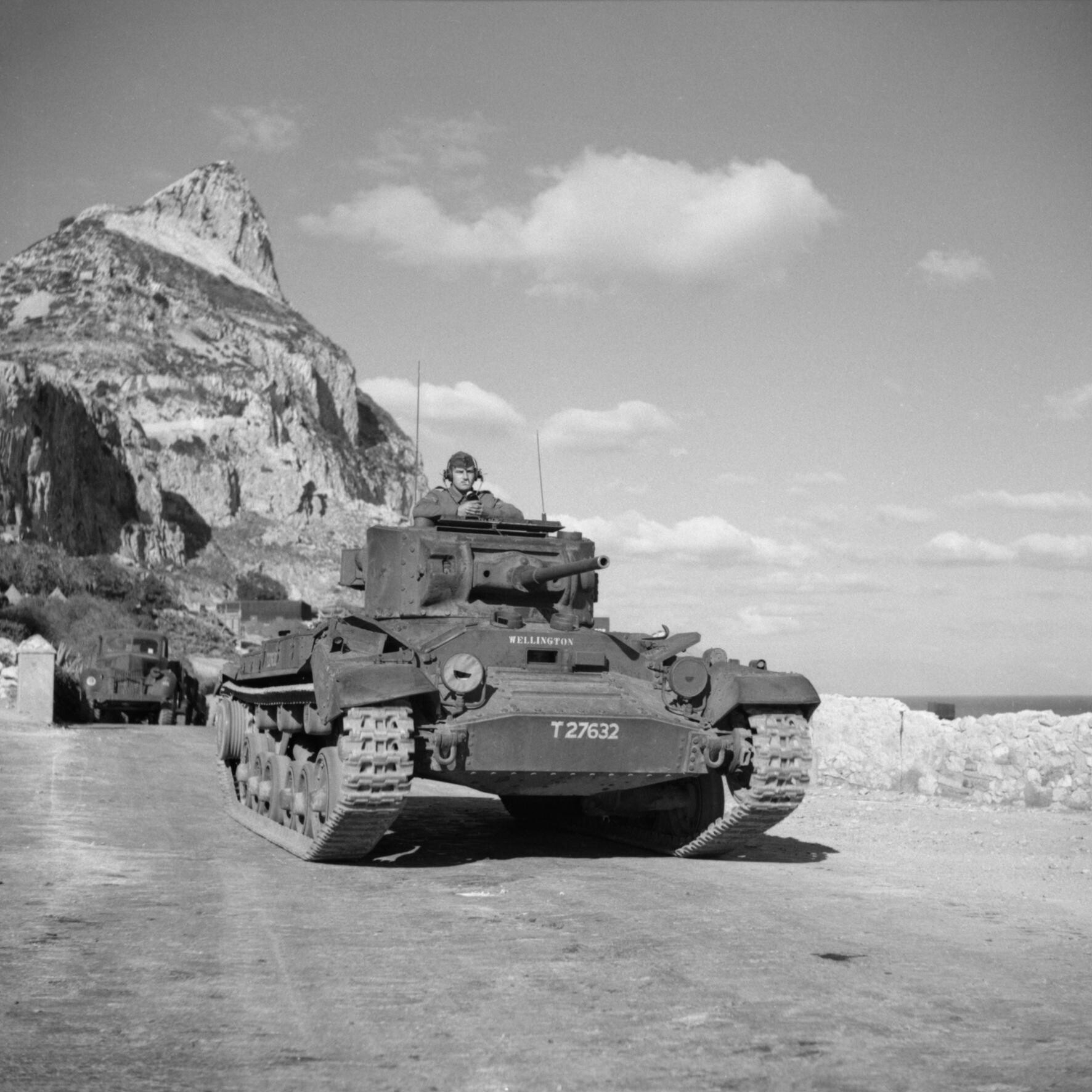
British tanks at the Spanish doorstep, Gibraltar late 1942

After 1936 the emerging Francoist state left the monarchist question parked in obscurity; feeble maneuvers on part of the Alfonsists and the Carlists were dismissed on the ground of wartime necessities. In the early 1940s the monarchist pressure started to mount. The Alfonsist claimant Don Juan, who in 1941–1942 courted Hitler about overthrowing Franco and setting up an authoritarian monarchy, changed his strategy. Now converted to constitutionalism, in March 1943 he addressed Franco with a letter, denouncing the regime as provisional and urging swift monarchical restoration; the response read that restoration based on dynastical or political continuity was out of the question. In June Franco received the most direct challenge so far, when 26 Cortes deputies signed a letter recommending that traditional state institutions be re-introduced. In August Don Juan dispatched another, increasingly bold message, countered shortly afterwards by a note from the Carlist leader, who warned that a future monarchy must be a Traditionalist, not a Liberal one. In September 1943 Franco faced a serious threat to his rule: majority of the most senior army generals signed a letter, in polite but ultimative terms demanding restoration of the monarchy. It was only with greatest difficulty that caudillo managed to talk them into compliance.

The international context of Francoism changed dramatically in 1942–1944. In the early 1940s the Allies were chiefly concerned with preventing Spain from joining the Axis; though unhappy about fascistoid nature of the regime, they could have not afforded ruining their relations with Madrid by challenging Franco's internal policy. The war developments of 1942–1943, especially the Anglo-American landing in North-Western Africa, German military disasters at Stalingrad and in Tunisia and the fall of Mussolini made Spain's entry into war a non-issue. In 1943 the official propaganda of the Allies already marketed a hostile vision of Spain; an American newsreel presented it as a fascist country and anti-Francoist tones in BBC broadcasts elicited protest even from a British press attaché in Madrid. However, the mounting Allied pressure was directed at preventing Spanish supplies to Germany rather than at toppling the regime. In late 1943 the Allied demands regarding termination of shipments to the Nazis became ultimative and spelled the threat of total fuel embargo, which indeed early next year would prove its effectiveness by bringing the Spanish economy to its knees in just two months. The public opinion and politicians in Britain and the United States were turning firmly against Franco. In late 1943 the dictator started to consider an Allied invasion a more likely threat than a German one and soon ordered re-grouping of the Spanish army accordingly.

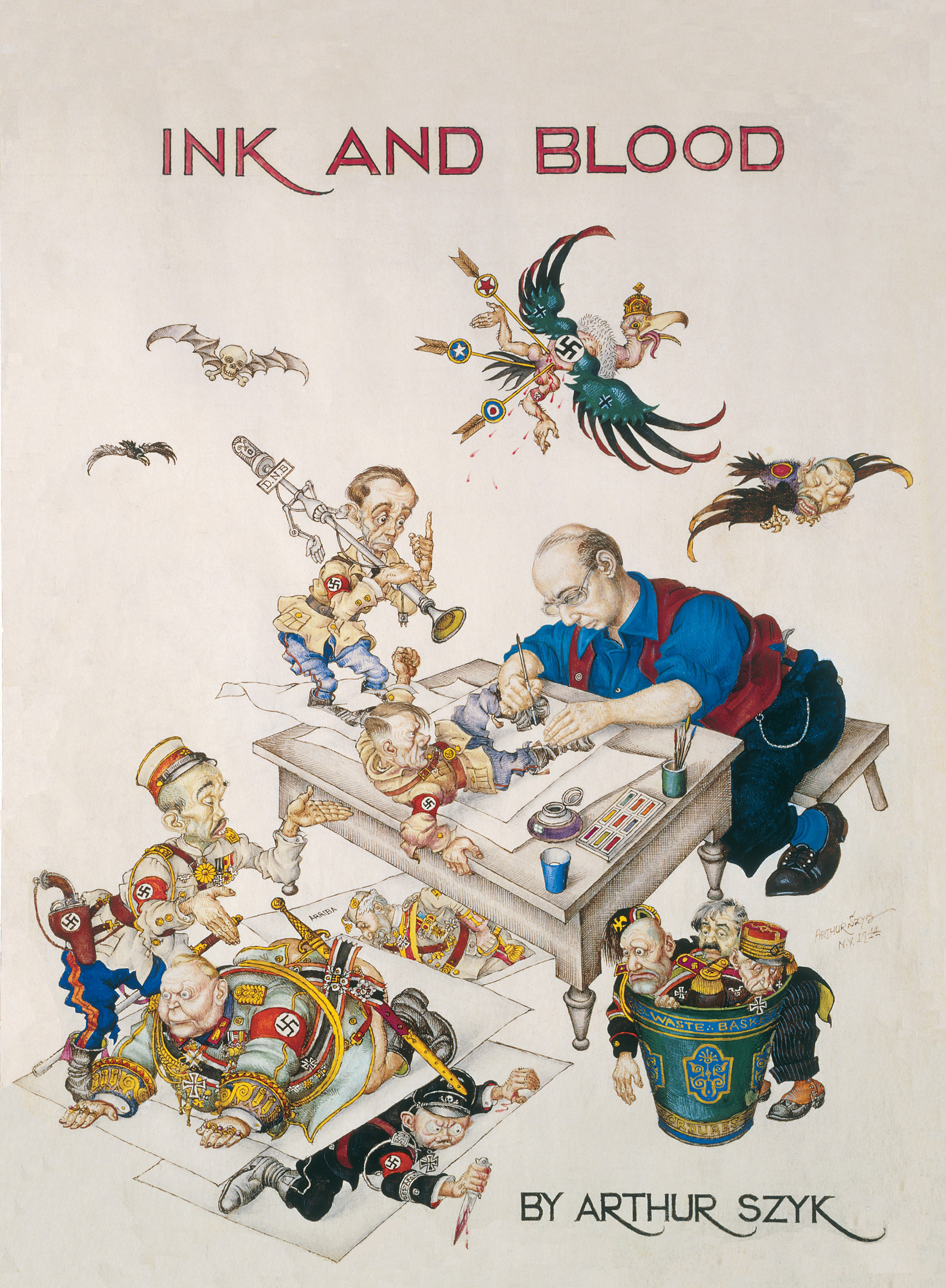
Franco among the Axis leaders, US cartoon, 1944

The increasing domestic monarchist fronde and the international pressure combined convinced Franco that a national-syndicalist regime built so far needed major re-dressing. As following the so-called Begoña crisis the chief architect of totalitarian state, Ramón Serrano Suñer, was already sidetracked, in 1943 the dictator embarked on first major redefinition of the system. The Falangist threads were slightly de-emphasized, while more focus on Catholic and traditional values was combined with efforts to distinguish between the Spanish and the Axis regimes. A quasi-parliament was intended to institutionalize the system and provide it with a non-dictatorial image. Last but not least, caudillo began to consider the monarchist solution seriously. In his trademark style balancing different political groupings, Franco decided to keep supporters of both dynastical options in check by pursuing two paths at the same time. The decreasingly cooperative but still tractable Alfonsist pretender Don Juan was invited to live in Spain, the offer which was ultimately turned down. The intransigent Carlist regent Don Javier was ignored first when trapped in Vichy France and later when arrested by Gestapo and detained in Dachau, but Carlos Pio was welcome in Spain.

== Carloctavista claim and its reception ==
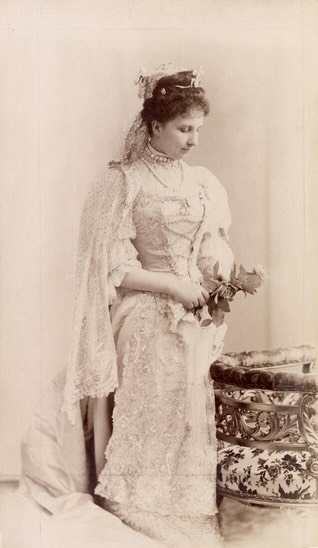
Princess Blanca of Bourbon

The Carloctavista claim relied upon the theory developed earlier by the Cruzadistas. The Carlist succession doctrine was based on a French Salic Law, upon its implementation in Spain in the early 18th century modified as Semi-Salic Law. It specified that by default the throne is inherited by males. Later in the 19th century the Carlist doctrine developed into a theory of so-called double legitimacy, namely that a king must by legitimate also by execution, the latter amounting to compliance with Traditionalist principles. Supporters of Carlos VIII advanced a theory, embraced already in 1914 by Vázquez de Mella, that according to the 1713 law an oldest daughter of a legitimate ruler in some circumstances might inherit the succession rights. Since Alfonso Carlos and the second last Carlist king Don Jaime had no children, they focused on Doña Blanca as the oldest daughter of the third last Carlist king, Carlos VII.

The highlight on Doña Blanca shocked many Carlists, convinced that the theory turned Carlism on its head; the movement was triggered by opposition to violation of the 1713 law by Fernando VII, who in 1830 declared his daughter Isabel the future queen. Supporters of Carlos Pio responded that the analogy was false. First, Doña Isabel violated heritage rights of her uncle, while in case of Doña Blanca there was no legitimate male heir. Second, Doña Isabel executed the heritage rights with respect to herself as a queen, while Doña Blanca was merely to transmit them to her son. Another challenge pointed to Don Carlos having been the fifth son of Doña Blanca. The response read that while the oldest brother died with no issue, the other three have excluded themselves from heritage either by concluding morganatic marriages or by non-compliance with double legitimacy theory. The first of these arguments turned against Carlos Pio in 1938, when he concluded a morganatic marriage as well; the issue was then played down until 1949, when abandoned by his wife he requested in Vatican that the marriage be declared invalid. Finally, there were other counter-arguments quoted.

From the Alfonsist perspective all the above was irrelevant debates between supporters of usurper dynasty. The Alfonsists were almost entirely united behind their candidate, Don Juan; only minor controversies related to his older brother, who on basis of his disability renounced all heritage rights in 1933 to backtrack in 1941 and to declare himself head of the House of Bourbon and legitimate heir to the French throne.

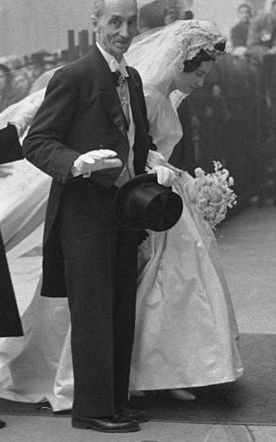
Don Javier, 1960

Franco's views on monarchy are not entirely clear. He was a loyal subject of Alfonso XIII, who sort of courted his young officer personally. Hence, during the Republic years the Alfonsists were somewhat disappointed by Franco standing clear of monarchist initiatives. His engagement in military plot of 1936 was not motivated by monarchist zeal; like most of the plotters he was bent on confronting proto-revolutionary Left and preventing apparent implosion of the state. During the Civil War he remained highly ambiguous about a would-be restoration, at some stage concluding that sort of it might be necessary as means of sustaining the regime. He cared little about dynastical debates and it seems compliance with his own vision and acceptance of his own leadership were the key criteria of choice. The dictator appreciated Carlism as its anti-democratic outlook to a large extent overlapped his own, but realized also that within the Spanish society it was a minority option and an Alfonsist candidate was more practicable, especially that Alfonsist sympathies prevailed among the top military. Since heads of both branches, Don Juan and Don Javier, refused to be domesticated, caudillo concluded he should proceed on monarchist path as slowly as possible and keeping all options opened. It seems that at that stage Franco considered nothing settled except that a future king is appointed on his own terms.

== Ascent (1943–1948) ==
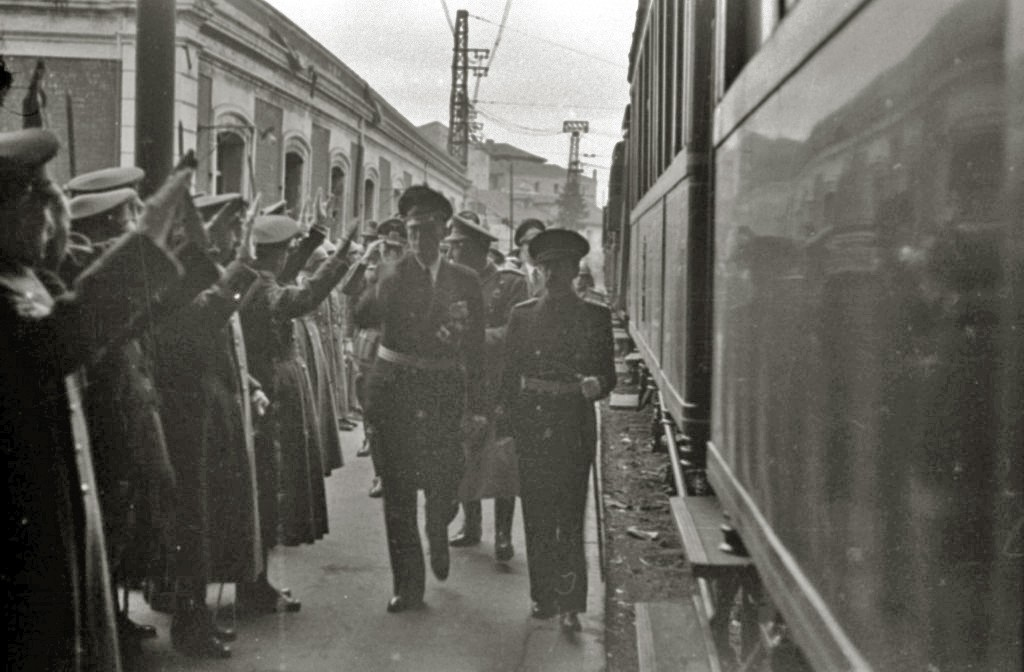
Spain, 1943

Since mid-1938 Don Carlos lived near Viareggio. None of the sources clarifies origins of his move back to Spain in early 1943; in particular it remains obscure whether it was himself or the Francoist authorities who initiated the transfer. Most scholars agree, however, that when in March the family settled in Barcelona, the move must have been at least approved by Franco. Cora y Lira, who after death of Pérez Nájera emerged as the key supporter of Carlos Pio, regularly visited El Pardo; he agreed with caudillo's entourage and with some key Falangists alike that he would soon commence a promotional campaign of the pretender. After Doña Blanca in May reverted to her 1936 pledge and claimed first assuming and then transmitting heritage rights to her youngest son, on June 29, 1943, the latter issued a manifesto, effectively claiming the monarchical succession. The document did not use the name of Carlos VIII and contained no reference to Francoism except a single note on Franco, who fights “peligros como rodean la Patria.”

Supporters of Don Carlos, now named Carloctavistas and again expulsed from the Comunión, started to organize themselves. General Cora y Lira was appointed secretario general of the new claimant, who set up also his Consejo General and embarked on forming Comunión Católico-Monárquica and Juventudes Carlistas, carefully styled not to challenge the ban on all political parties except FET. Enjoying total freedom of movement and accompanied by the police he commenced touring the country. This campaign, exercised in 1944–1946, was aimed at promoting the pretender without seeking massive adhesions; the Octavista political strategy relied upon supporting the regime and ignoring its differences with the Traditionalist doctrine; many of its leaflets featured the "Franco y Carlos VIII" slogan. The official policy was permissive though short of direct endorsement: government and local officials did not attend Carloctavista meetings, however, few Carloctavista supporters landed high admin jobs themselves. The mainstream press were permitted to mention him on the societé rather than political columns. Nevertheless, it remained striking that Don Carlos was the only royal claimant travelling across Spain and openly promoting his cause.

Octavistas were in acute conflict both with mainstream Carlism, loyal to the regency of Don Javier and intransigently opposed to Francoism, and with collaborative branch headed by conde Rodezno and leaning towards dynastic accord with Don Juan. This occasionally led to violent clashes, like in December 1945 in Pamplona. The Carloctavista strength was that many Carlists, tired of semi-clandestine status and envious about open campaign of Don Carlos, were getting increasingly irritated by what they considered inefficient overdue regency. The Carloctavista weakness was that many Carlists saw Carlos Pio as a Francoist puppet, animated with the sole purpose to confuse. As a result, the Carloctavistas, initially referred to as "elites with no supporters", attracted significant backing, though they did not manage to dominate the Javieristas. Some authors claim Carloctavistas might have equaled Javieristas in terms of popularity, enjoying most support in Navarre and in Catalonia. They controlled some of the Carlist periodicals; the highest-positioned though not particularly vehement Octavista supporter was Esteban Bilbao; other nationally known figures included Antonio Iturmendi, Joaquín Bau, Jaime del Burgo, Juan Granell Pascual and Antonio Lizarza Irribaren; many Carloctavistas were politicians known locally.

Francoist CoA

The climax of Carloctavista bid fell on 1947–1948. Amidst the nadir of international ostracism, Franco decided to make a first formal step towards a monarchy and launched a campaign in favour of Ley de Sucesión en la Jefatura del Estado, the document which for the first time officially declared Spain a monarchy. The law left designation of the future king almost entirely in hands of Franco and did not contain a single reference to hereditary claims; it infuriated both Don Juan and Don Javier, who immediately addressed the dictator with protest letters. Don Carlos was from the onset fully supportive of the law and appeared in propaganda campaign related to the 1947 referendum, very cautiously featured in official media like weekly newsreels. At that time some suspected that the law itself might have been written with Carlos VIII in mind.

== Descent (1948–1953) ==
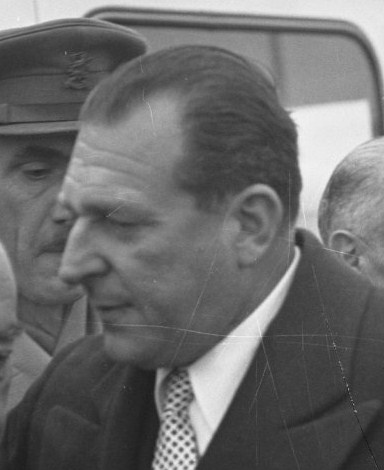
Alfonsist claimant, Juan

In 1947–48 the international politics turned a corner and though the image of Spain as quasi-enemy from the Second World War lingered, it was getting replaced by perception of quasi-ally in the just commencing Cold War; this rendered monarchist redressing of the regime less urgent. On the other hand, what looked like Franco playing the Carlos VIII card might have worked with regard to Don Juan, who finally agreed to meet the dictator. During their August 1948 encounter it was settled that a 10-year-old son of the claimant, Juan Carlos, would be sent to Spain to continue his education, which indeed took place in November that year. The position of Don Carlos changed dramatically. Though no commitments with regard to Don Juan's son were made and according to the Law of Succession he could be crowned no earlier than in 1968, the regime made a small but visible step towards a would-be Alfonsist restoration. Another blow came in mid-1949, when Christa Satzger abandoned Don Carlos and in Reno obtained an express Nevada-style divorce. This shattered his image of a model Catholic family man and though he requested the marriage be declared void by the Church so that he could remarry, the perspective of a legitimate male descendant became unlikely either in the near future or at all.

The Carloctavistas kept supporting their cause by organizing royal trips, meetings and congresses. In 1948 Juventudes Carlistas published anonymous program booklet; the doctrine was summarized in a long title, El carlismo no quiere ni una Monarquía absoluta, ni una Monarquía liberal, ni un Estado totalitario, ni un Estado policíaco. The work advanced a fairly Traditionalist vision, founded on monarchical, Catholic, regionalist and organicist threads; it contained no reference to caudillaje system, by no means endorsed Falangist national-syndicalism and when discussing social issues focused on gremialist structures instead. What differed it from orthodox Carlism was that modernizing effort prevailed over focus on tradition; it contained even some democratic references stressing total mobility of the society, unheard of in tradition-entrenched typical Carlist outlook.

The grouping was getting internally divided. 1950 saw emergence of Juntas de Ofensivas de Agitación Carloctavista and Movimiento de Agitación Social Católico Monárquista, two initiatives not agreed with Cora y Lira and apparently confronting his strategy of total commitment to Franco. Two years later they were complemented by Frente Nacional Carlista; it is not clear whether these attempts were discussed with the claimant. In 1950 Francisco Javier Lizarza Inda published La sucesión legítima a la corona de España, a full-blown lecture of Octavista claim; re-issued in 1951, it won only those convinced already. After a few years of endless petitioning, in 1952 Franco formally received Don Carlos during their only personal meeting; on part of the dictator the move was probably intended to counter Don Javier, who just a month earlier had terminated the Carlist regency and launched his personal claim to the throne. There is no record of their one-hour-conversation, though afterwards Carlos Pio remained ecstatic; feelings were running high also when later that year Franco accepted a Carlos-VIII-created Orden de San Carlos Borromeo.

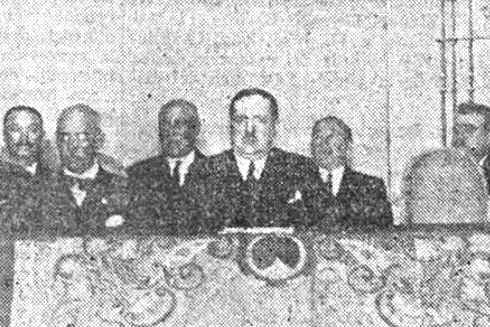
Jesús Cora y Lira (middle)

Any official, semi-official or unofficial endorsement of Don Carlos's claim on part of the regime failed to materialize before in late 1953 he unexpectedly died of cerebral hemorrhage. Though chain-smoker, he was of rather good health, which immediately triggered rumours about a possible assassination attempt; since not a shadow of proof was unearthed, they remained nothing but speculations. Funeral celebrations assumed unexpectedly high-profile; though Franco did not attend, many other top state officials did. Even the popular pro-Alfonsist daily ABC, which maintained almost perfect blackout on Carlos VIII during the previous ten years, now felt it safe to acknowledge his death; a two-page editorial praised his anti-communism and dwelt on trivia like his affection to motor sports, but did not utter a single word about his royal claim.

== Demise (after 1953) ==
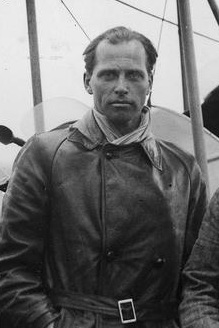
Don Antonio, picture from 1930

The orphaned Carloctavistas found themselves in total disarray. Most of them, perceiving their cause as hopeless, withdrew to privacy, a few started to near the Javieristas, while almost none joined supporters of Don Juan, by another Carlist branch considered the legitimate heir. Those sticking to the Octavista line focused their attention on different relatives of Don Carlos. Cora y Lira advanced the cause of his older brother, Don Antonio, who seemed leaning towards some sort of political activity. Early 1954 Cora convinced most members of Comunión Católico-Monárquica executive to welcome Don Antonio as Carlos IX, the move which caught him by surprise. Following brief vacillation period, later that year Don Antonio declared that he would not assume any political activity. Most Carloctavista leaders were overwhelmed by this sequence of disasters and sensed that their cause was turning into a grotesque; one of them concluded that "estamos, queridos compañeros, en el más absoluto y completo de los ridículos".

There were some, however, who were determined to go on. Jaime del Burgo suggested that the oldest daughter of Carlos Pio, a 14-year-old Doña Alejandra, is declared "abanderada provisional" so that she could transmit hereditary rights to her future son. Cora y Lira promoted the cause of Don Antonio's 17-year-old son Don Domingo and launched fund-raising campaign to facilitate his settling in Spain, until in 1955 furious might-have-been Carlos IX expulsed Cora for "arbitrario ejercicio del mando". Don Antonio performed a U-turn in 1956: he officially declared himself heir to the Carlist throne and nominated Lizarza Iribarren his delegate in Spain. The confusion was almost total when the same year another brother of late Don Carlos, Don Francisco José, challenged his older sibling and claimed monarchic rights himself, his key supporter turned Cora y Lira.

During the following few years the two brothers—none of them living in Spain—advertised their own claims, e.g. Don Antonio by issuing royal manifestos in the late 1950s and Don Francisco José by fighting nobility-related legal battles before Spanish courts in the early 1960s. In 1961 Don Antonio retired into privacy and Lizarza negotiated formal re-integration of the Antonianos into Comunión; eventually only many local leaders - though not Lizarza himself - in 1962 decided to join the Javieristas and were accepted by Valiente. Don Francisco José in the mid-1960s reduced his activity to few isolated episodes. In 1966 he volunteered to the Spanish embassy in Vienna to declare support for Ley Orgánica del Estado, just to be subject to a referendum; in 1968 a small group of his supporters showed up at the massive Javierista gathering at Montejurra, staging sort of a semi-suicidal provocation. His cause was supported by few periodicals, mostly ¡Carlistas! In 1969 Pueblo, a publication issued by Organización Sindical, published a lengthy interview with Don Francisco José; it was probably part of the last-minute Falangist attempt to block official designation of Don Juan Carlos as the future king.

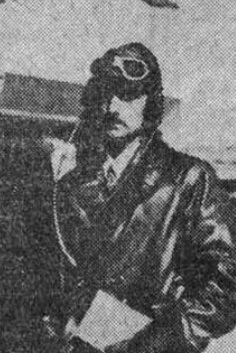
Don Francisco José

The Octavistas received what looked like a mortal blow in 1969, with death of the most dedicated supporter of the cause Cora y Lira, even though Don Francisco José died in 1975 and Don Antonio in 1987. In the mid 1980s most Carloctavistas, reduced to hardly active minuscule grouplets, merged into a united Traditionalist organization, Comunión Tradicionalista Carlista, which refrained from endorsing any specific claimant or branch. In the Spanish public discourse the Carloctavistas are currently present mostly thanks to a handful of websites, featuring Don Antonio's son as the legitimate king of Spain. Indeed, Don Domingo, residing mostly in New York, decided to raise the claim himself. Though in his 20s he was totally ignorant and indeed indifferent to the Carlist cause, now he styles himself as king and sporadically issues documents like Proclamación de Don Domingo de Habsburgo-Borbón y Hohenzollern, Rey legitimo de España. The eldest daughter of Carlos Pio lives in Barcelona, and the other in New York; since the early 1960s they maintain no links with Carlism.

== Reception and legacy ==
Carlist standard

Within Carlism the dynastic legitimacy of the Carloctavista claim is still disputed. In general historiography this question remains a minor if not a barely noticed issue. The prevailing theory is that Octavismo owed its political standing to the Francoist policy of checks and balances rather than to the scale of genuine popular support for Carlos VIII. There are, however, vastly different views related to autonomous or non-autonomous character of the movement.

The most bold opinion holds that Carloctavismo was by and large invented by the Francoist regime. This reading is sustained mostly by historians related to Francoism and to Partido Carlista; the latter openly pursue their partisan judgment by naming the Carloctavista supporters "traitors". In some works they acknowledge Cruzadista origins of the movement; in some they present it as almost entirely fabricated by Franco, who pulled his pet claimant out of a hat with the sole purpose to distract the monarchists. The authors from this school claim that for some time the Francoist regime not only tolerated, but in fact promoted and financed Don Carlos, whose adventure was scarcely more than an "appendix to Francoism". At times they specifically identify hard-line syndicalist groups as genuine architects of the plot, quoting claims made by Falangists or ex-Falangists themselves and identifying José Luis Arrese as "el inventor" of Carlos VIII. In few works historians representing such perspective note that neither the invention nor the sustention theory has been proven yet, though that they were widely believed to have been correct at the time.

Many scholars refrain from presenting Carloctavistas as mere puppets of the regime and acknowledge genuine support the group enjoyed. Some of them, both in Spain and abroad, repeat—with reservations or unconditionally—the thesis of financial support lent by the regime, even as late as in the 1960s. Others perform review of different views and limit themselves to concluding that Francoism either was at least amicably tolerating the Carloctavistas or it was lending them at least non-financial forms of support. The collaborationist Octavista line is presented as genuine. Some see it as a conscious political strategy, an attempt aimed at gaining room for open activity and possibly using Francoism as a vehicle for crowning a Carlist king. Some see it as rooted in Carloctavista theoretical framework, to a large extent overlapping with the official doctrine, and wrap up by claiming that "with no doubt, Octavism was either Carlism of the Francoists or Francoism of the offshoot Carlists".

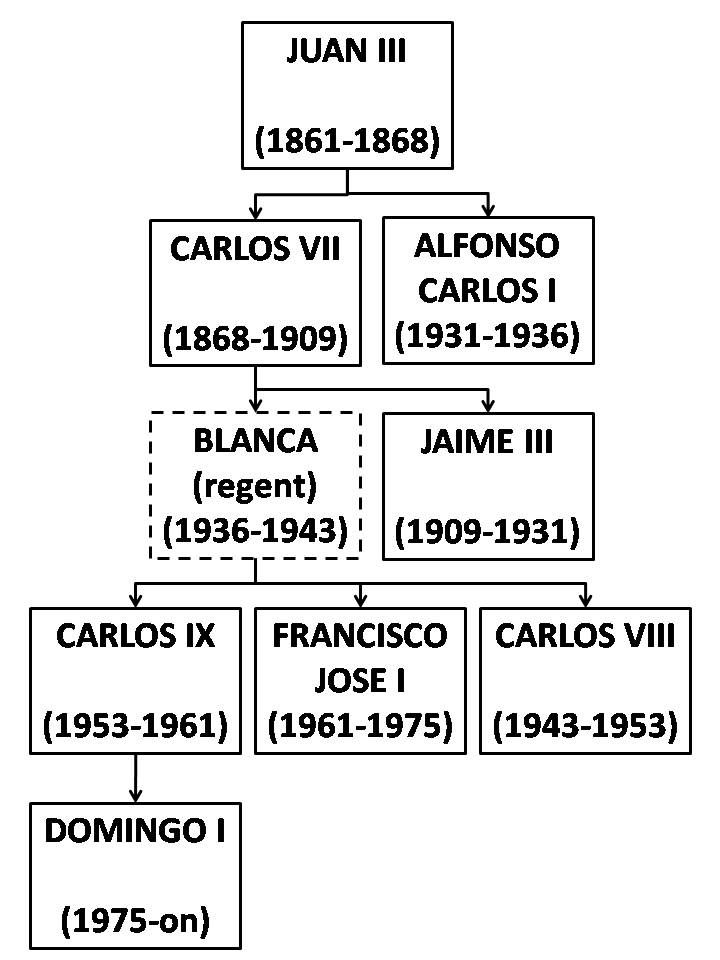
most recent Carlist pretenders according to the current Carloctavista reading

The thesis of fully autonomous character of Carloctavismo is advanced mostly by its activists or their descendants. They focus on pre-Francoist, Cruzadista origins of Don Carlos' claim, dwell on extended network of his supporters and vehemently deny having accepted financial support from the regime. Authors of major monographs on the movement—two out of three not Carloctavistas themselves though certainly Left-wing sympathizers neither—tend to share this perspective. Their works relate the origins of the movement to profound dynastical crisis within Carlism, later enhanced by political fragmentation and bewilderment of Traditionalism resulting from different strategies adopted towards Francoism. Within this perspective, theoretical outlook of the Octavistas is described as having had little in common with Falangist national-syndicalism and having been rather deeply anchored in Traditionalist thought. One scholar suggests Don Carlos stood a real chance of becoming a king, ruined by his wife, who tarnished his image and deprived him of future male descendency. These authors presents Carloctavista stand versus the so-called Rodeznistas, a collaborative and pro-Juanista branch of Carlism, as vehement opposition. Carloctavista support for the regime is presented as an attempt to outsmart the dictator and use the Francoist political setting for own political goals.

== See also ==
- Carlism
- Don Carlos
- Don Javier
- Don Juan
- Don Antonio
- Don Francisco Jose
- Don Domingo
- Jesús Cora y Lira
- Jaime del Burgo Torres
