= Archduchess Margaretha of Austria =

Archduchess of Austria and Princess of Tuscany

Archduchess Margaretha
- Mrs. Francesco Maria Taliani de Marchio
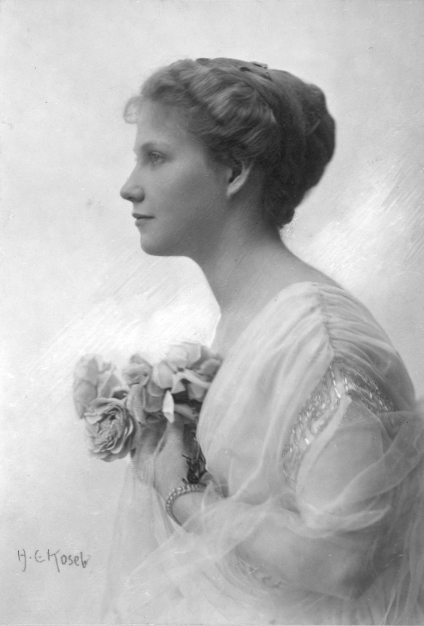
- Margaretha in 1913
- Born: 8 May 1894; Lemberg, Kingdom of Galicia and Lodomeria, Austria-Hungary
- Died: 21 June 1986 (aged 92); Viareggio, Italy
- Spouse: Francesco Maria Taliani de Marchio (m. 1937; died 1968)
Names
- German: Margarita Raineria Maria Antonia Blanka Leopoldine Beatrix Anna Josephina
- House: Habsburg-Tuscany
- Father: Archduke Leopold Salvator of Austria
- Mother: Princess Blanca of Bourbon

Archduchess Margaretha of Austria (German: Margaretha, Erzherzogin von Österreich-Toskana; 8 May 1894 – 21 June 1986) was a daughter of Archduke Leopold Salvator of Austria and Infanta Blanca of Spain. She was member of the Tuscan branch of the Imperial House of Habsburg-Lorraine, an Archduchess of Austria and Princess of Tuscany by birth. After the dissolution of Austria-Hungary, she lived in exile, first in Barcelona and from the 1930s until the end of her life in Italy. In 1937, she married an Italian diplomat, Marchese Francesco Maria Taliani de Marchio. The couple, who had married in their forties, did not have children.

== Early life ==
Archduchess Margaretha was born on 8 May 1894 at Lemberg, Galicia, (modern day Lviv, in western Ukraine), then part of the Austro-Hungarian Empire. She was the third among the ten children of Archduke Leopold Salvator of Austria and of his wife Princess Blanca of Bourbon. She was christened Margarita Raineria Maria Antonia Blanka Leopoldine Beatrix Anna Josephina. Called "Meg" within her family, she received the name Margarethe in honor of her maternal grandmother, Princess Margherita of Bourbon-Parma, who had died a year earlier.

Archduchess Margaretha grew up in the last period of the Habsburg monarchy. She was raised with her many brothers and sisters in the various properties owned by her parents. While in Vienna, they lived at the Palais Toskana with Schloss Wilhelminenberg as their country estate. Vacations were spent in Italy where Infanta Blanca owned a rural property near Viareggio. Theirs was a multi-cultural household as Margaretha's paternal ancestors had reigned in Austria, Tuscany and the Kingdom of the Two Sicilies. Her maternal family had reigned in Spain, Parma, Modena, Portugal and France.

Archduchess Margaretha was educated in the company of her sisters Dolores and Immaculata. The three archduchesses, very close in age, were artistically inclined. Margaretha had a passion for drama. She learned, besides her native German, French, Spanish Hungarian and Italian. Margaretha had allure, culture and intelligence, but was plain. During World War I, Margaretha's father was inspector general of artillery and her eldest brother, Archduke Rainier joined the Austrian army to fight in the Italian front. While Margaretha and her sister Immaculata worked for the Austrian red cross.

== Exile ==
At the fall of the Habsburg monarchy, the republican government of Austria confiscated the properties of the Habsburgs. The family lost all their fortune. Margaretha's two eldest brothers, Archdukes Rainer and Leopold, decided to remain in Austria and recognized the new republic. The rest of the family moved to Spain in January 1919. They lived in Barcelona, with simplicity for more than fifteen years. The unleash of the Spanish Civil War in 1936 forced Archduchess Margaretha, her mother and her unmarried siblings to leave Spain.

Archduchess Margaretha married late in life. Her husband, Francesco Maria Taliani, Marchese di Marchio (22 October 1887 – 16 March 1968), was an Italian diplomat. The wedding took place on 27 November 1937 at Schloss Sonnberg, property of her brother Archduke Anton and his wife Princess Ileana of Romania.

Archduchess Margaretha and her husband settled in Nanjing, then capital of China, where Taliani served as the Italian ambassador to China between 1938 and 1943. It was a turbulent period. In December 1937, Japanese troops occupied Nanjing. In June 1940, Italy entered World War II siding with Nazi Germany and Japan. When, in September 1943, Italy surrendered to the Allied forces, Archduchess Margaretha and her husband were detained and interned in a Japanese concentration camp until the summer of 1945. Early in 1946, Archduchess Margaretha and her husband returned to Italy. Margaretha's husband was very wealthy and an avid art collector. They bought a house in Venice. In February 1951, they moved to Spain, where Margaretha's husband served as the Italian Ambassador to Francoist Spain until 1952, when Taliani was forced to retire. The couple settled in Rome. After twenty years of marriage, Francesco Maria Taliani de Marchio died in 1968, age 80. In her widowhood Archduchess Margaretha lived between Rome and la Tenuta Reale, a rural property near Viareggio that she shared with her sisters Dolores and Immaculata. Archduchess Margaretha outlived her two sisters. At her death in Rome on 21 June 1986, at age 92, she bequested la Tenuta reale to the commune of Viareggio to serve as public and cultural center. Her nephew, Archduke Dominik, inherited her fortune.

== Ancestry ==
Ancestors of Archduchess Margaretha of Austria

8. Leopold II, Grand Duke of Tuscany
4. Archduke Karl Salvator of Austria, Prince of Tuscany
9. Princess Maria Antonia of the Two Sicilies
2. Archduke Leopold Salvator, Prince of Tuscany
10. Ferdinand II of the Two Sicilies
5. Princess Maria Immaculata of Bourbon-Two Sicilies
11. Maria Theresa of Austria
1. Archduchess Margaretha of Austria, Princess of Tuscany
12. Juan, Count of Montizón
6. Carlos, Duke of Madrid
13. Archduchess Maria Beatrix of Austria-Este
3. Infanta Blanca of Spain
14. Charles III, Duke of Parma
7. Princess Margherita of Bourbon-Parma
15. Princess Louise Marie Thérèse of France

== Bibliography ==
- Hamann, Brigitte. The Habsburgs: a biographical dictionary. Ueberreuter, 1988. ISBN 3800032473.
- Harding, Bertita. Lost Waltz: A Story of Exile. Bobbs-Merrill, 1944. ASIN: B0007DXCLY
- Mateos Sainz de Medrano. Ricardo. An Unconventional Family. Royalty Digest, Vol 4, N 1. July 1994.
- McIntosh, David. The Unknown Habsburgs. Rosvall Royal Books, 2000. ISBN 91-973978-0-6
