= Archduchess Maria Antonia of Austria (1899–1977) =

Archduchess of Austria and Princess of Tuscany

Archduchess Maria Antonia
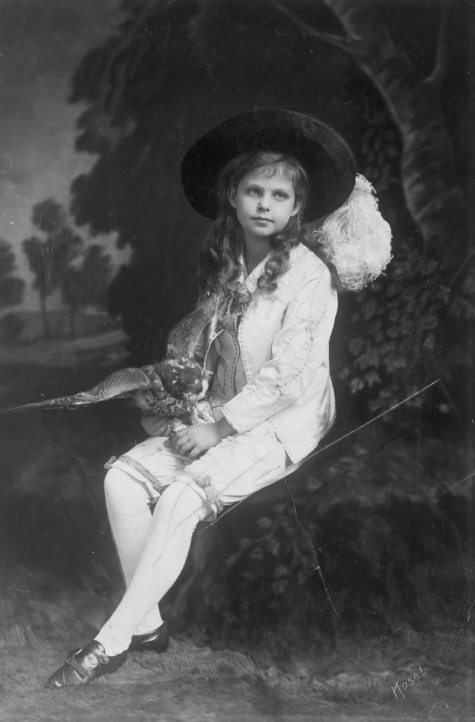
- Maria Antonia in 1909
- Born: 13 July 1899; Zagreb, Kingdom of Croatia-Slavonia, Austria-Hungary
- Died: 22 October 1977 (aged 78); Porto Alegre, Brazil
- Spouse: Don Ramón de Orlandis y Villalonga (m. 1924; died 1936) Don Luis Perez Sucre (m. 1942; died 1950)
- Issue: Blanca Maria de Habsburg y Orlandis; Juan de Habsburg y Orlandis, Baron of Pinopar; Maria Antonia de Habsburg y Orlandis; Isabel de Habsburg y Orlandis, Marquise of Sollerich; Alfonsina de Habsburg y Orlandis
Names
- German: Maria Antonia Roberta Blanka Leopoldina Karole Josepha Raphaela Michaela Ignatia Aurelia
- House: Habsburg-Tuscany
- Father: Archduke Leopold Salvator of Austria
- Mother: Princess Blanca of Bourbon

Archduchess Maria Antonia of Austria German: Maria Antonia, Erzherzogin von Österreich-Toskana (13 July 1899 – 22 October 1977) was a daughter of Archduke Leopold Salvator of Austria and Infanta Blanca of Spain. She was member of the Tuscan branch of the Imperial House of Habsburg-Lorraine, an Archduchess of Austria and Princess of Tuscany by birth. In 1919, after the dissolution of Austria-Hungary, she moved with her family to Spain. In 1924 she married Ramón de Orlandis y Villalonga, a Spanish aristocrat. When she became a widow during the Spanish Civil War, Archduchess Maria Antonia moved permanently to South America where she remarried.

== Early life ==
Archduchess Maria Antonia of Austria was born on 13 July 1899 at Zagreb, then part of Austria-Hungary. She was the sixth of ten children of Archduke Leopold Salvator of Austria (1863–1931) and of his wife Princess Blanca of Bourbon (1868–1949). She was given the baptismal names Maria Antonia Roberta Blanka Leopoldina Karole Josepha Raphaela Michaela Ignatia Aurelia, but was called Mimi, by her family.

Archduchess Maria Antonia grew up in the last period of the Habsburg monarchy. She was raised with her many brothers and sisters in the various properties owned by her parents. While in Vienna, they lived at the Palais Toskana with Schloss Wilhelminenberg as their country estate. Vacations were spent in Italy where Infanta Blanca owned a rural property near Viareggio. Theirs was a multi cultural household as Archduchess Maria Antonia's paternal ancestors had reigned in Austria, Tuscany and the Kingdom of the Two Sicilies. Her maternal family had reigned in Spain, Parma, Modena, Portugal and France. The fourth of five sisters, Archduchess Maria Antonia was raised paired with her younger sister Archduchess Assumpta.

== Exile ==
Archduchess Maria Antonia was nineteen years old at the fall of the Habsburg monarchy. The end of World War I marked a sharp down turned in her family's prosperity. The republican government of Austria confiscated the properties of the Habsburgs. The family lost all their fortune. Maria Antonia's eldest brothers, Archdukes Rainer and Leopold, remained in Austria and they recognized the new republic. The rest of the family moved to Spain in January 1919. They settled in Barcelona living with simplicity with very limited means. While Maria Antonia's three elder sisters Archduchess Dolores, Inmaculata and Margareta were pliable, Archduchesses Maria Antonia and her younger sister Assunta were more rebellious and clashed often with their mother, Infanta Blanca.

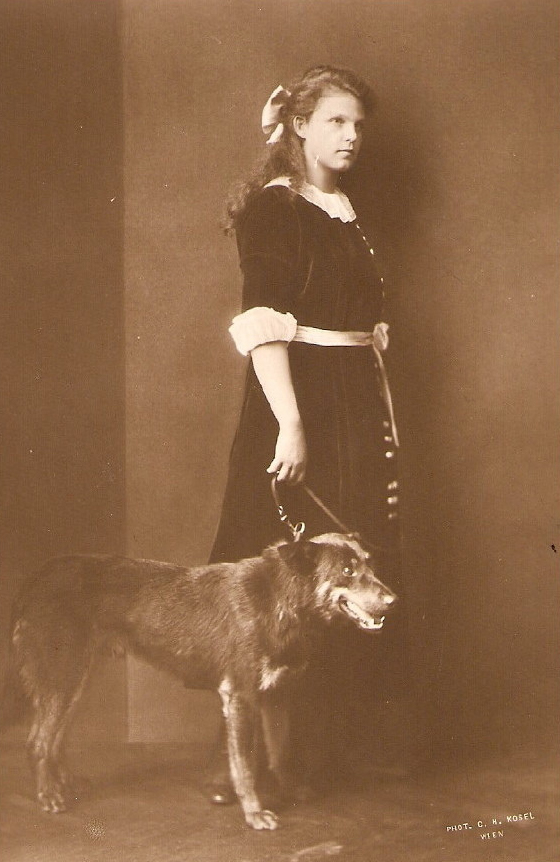
The Archduchess in 1913

While living in Barcelona Maria Antonia turned increasingly towards religion. Although both of her parents were observant Catholics, they found Maria Antonia's religious fervor worrisome particularly because her sister Assunta followed Maria Antonia's lead. Archduchess Maria Antonia wished to become a nun, but her mother thought that Maria Antonia had neither the necessary vocation nor the temperament to follow a religious life. To make her reflect on her decision Maria Antonia's parents took her to the Island of Mallorca. At the same time Infanta Blanca and her husband wanted to see if there were any properties they could claim from Archduke Ludwig Salvador's uncle who had died a decade earlier, unmarried. The family found that there was nothing left they could have inherited. Archduchess Maria Antonia quickly left behind her intentions to become a nun. She fell in love with Ramon Orlandis y Villalonga (1896–1936), who belonged to the minor Spanish nobility, but like the Archduchess, he lacked personal fortune. His father had lost his title when he failed to pay the taxes of nobility. The marriage took place in Barcelona on 16 July 1924. The couple lived in Mallorca where they were the parents of five children who bore the surname Orlandis y Habsburgo:

- Blanca Maria (1926–1969) married in 1948 Raul Ereñu (1908–1969). They had five children
- Juan, Baron de Pinopar (1928–1977) married in 1951 Hildegarde Bragagnolo (1932–2001). They had eight children.
- Maria Antonia (1929–1991). Died unmarried
- Isabel (1931) married in 1954 Fausto Morell, Marqués de Sollerich (1926–2003). They had six children.
- Alfonsina (1936) married in 1981 Joaquín Zaforteza (born 1930). They had no issue.

Archduchess Maria Antonia's husband died during the Spanish Civil War in 1936. A widow with five children Archduchess Maria Antonia, as the widow de Orlandis, emigrated to South America. In 1942, in Uruguay, she married Argentine-born Don Luis Perez Sucre (1899–1950). Her second husband died eight years later. Archduchess Maria Antonia died in Brazil in 1977.

== Ancestry ==
Ancestors of Archduchess Maria Antonia of Austria (1899–1977)

8. Leopold II, Grand Duke of Tuscany
4. Archduke Karl Salvator of Austria, Prince of Tuscany
9. Princess Maria Antonia of the Two Sicilies
2. Archduke Leopold Salvator, Prince of Tuscany
10. Ferdinand II of the Two Sicilies
5. Princess Maria Immaculata of Bourbon-Two Sicilies
11. Maria Theresa of Austria
1. Archduchess Maria Antonia of Austria, Princess of Tuscany
12. Juan, Count of Montizón
6. Carlos, Duke of Madrid
13. Archduchess Maria Beatrix of Austria-Este
3. Infanta Blanca of Spain
14. Charles III, Duke of Parma
7. Princess Margherita of Bourbon-Parma
15. Princess Louise Marie Thérèse of France

== Bibliography ==
- Harding, Bertita. Lost Waltz: A Story of Exile. Bobbs-Merrill, 1944. ASIN: B0007DXCLY
- McIntosh, David. The Unknown Habsburgs. Rosvall Royal Books, 2000. ISBN 91-973978-0-6
