= Archduke Karl Pius of Austria, Prince of Tuscany =

Archduke Karl Pius

Carlist-Carloctavismo claimant to the Spanish throne
- Pretense: 29 June 1943 – 24 December 1953
- Predecessor: Infante Alfonso Carlos, Duke of San Jaime (1936)
- Successor: Archduke Anton of Austria
- Born: 4 December 1909; Vienna, Austria-Hungary
- Died: 24 December 1953 (aged 44); Barcelona, Spain
- Burial: Royal Abbey of Santa Maria de Poblet
- Spouse: Christa Satzger de Bálványos (m. 1938; div. 1950)
- Issue: Alejandra Blanca de Habsburgo-Lorena y Satzger; María Inmaculada de Habsburgo-Lorena y Satzger
Names
- Don Carlos Pío María Adelgunda Blanca Leopoldo Ignacio Rafael Miguel Salvador Ciriaco Angel Barbara de Habsburgo-Lorena y de Borbón and Carolus Pius Maria Adelgonda Blanka Leopoldus Ignatius Raphael Michael Salvator Chrillus Angelus Barbara von Habsburg-Lothringen, Erzherzog von Österreich, Prinz von Toskana
- House: Habsburg-Lorraine
- Father: Archduke Leopold Salvator of Austria, Prince of Tuscany
- Mother: Princess Blanca of Bourbon

Archduke Karl Pius of Austria, Prince Royal of Hungary and Bohemia, Prince of Tuscany (4 December 1909 – 24 December 1953), known as Carlos Pío de Habsburgo-Lorena y de Borbón in Spanish, was a member of the Tuscan branch of the Imperial House of Habsburg and a Carlist claimant to the throne of Spain under the assumed name of "Carlos VIII". He was the tenth and youngest child of Archduke Leopold Salvator of Austria, Prince of Tuscany and Princess Blanca of Bourbon.

== Early life ==
Karl was born in Vienna, Austria-Hungary, the youngest son of Archduke Leopold Salvator of Austria (1863–1931) and of his wife Princess Blanca of Bourbon (1868–1949). His mother was the eldest daughter of Infante Carlos, Duke of Madrid, Carlist claimant to the throne of Spain and Legitimist claimant to the French throne.

Karl was given the baptismal names Carolus Pius Maria Adelgonda Blanka Leopoldus Ignatius Raphael Michael Salvator Chrillus Angelus Barbara. His godparents were Pope Pius X and the Countess of Bardi.

Karl grew up in the Palais Toskana which formerly stood in Argentinierstrasse in Vienna. In 1919 the republican government of Austria confiscated all the properties of the Habsburgs. Karl moved with his family first to Tenuta Reale, a villa belonging to his mother's family near Viareggio in Italy. Then they moved to Barcelona in Spain. In 1926 he was given Spanish nationality.

After completing high-school Karl entered the Industrial Engineering School. He returned to Austria in the early 1930s and joined the Heimwehr, a conservative militia which engaged in street fights with Communists and Socialists.

== Cruzadistas ==
In 1932 a section of the Carlist movement, called cruzadistas from the name of the magazine El Cruzado Español, began to entrust their hopes for the future of Carlism to the sons of Blanca de Borbón. At the time the Carlist claimant Infante Alfonso Carlos, Duke of San Jaime, Karl's great-uncle, was in his eighties and childless. There were no other male-line descendants of the first Carlist claimant Carlos V. The cruzadistas (along with the majority of Carlists) held that Alfonso XIII, constitutional king of Spain, and his sons were excluded from the succession on account of their liberalism. The cruzadistas also believed that the more junior male lines of the House of Bourbon were also permanently excluded from the Spanish succession; some, like the Bourbon-Sicilies, were held to be excluded because they had recognised Alfonso as constitutional king of Spain, while others, like the Bourbon-Parmas, were held to be excluded because of French nationality.

Since the cruzadistas believed that there were no more male members of the House of Bourbon eligible to succeed to the Spanish throne, they held that the Carlist claim should pass at the death of Alfonso Carlos to the sons of his closest female relative, Princess Blanca of Bourbon . This was a minority view in the Carlist movement, and one which was condemned by Alfonso Carlos himself.

As long as Alfonso Carlos lived, Blanca and her sons, including Karl, were hesitant to press their claims. When Alfonso Carlos died in 1936, Karl at first supported the regent of the Carlist Communion, Prince Xavier of Bourbon-Parma, who had been appointed by Alfonso Carlos. In the confused circumstances of the Spanish Civil War Karl did not make any immediate claim to the throne.

== Carlist claimant ==
On 29 June 1943 Karl issued a manifesto in which he claimed to be the legitimate successor to the Spanish throne. At the time, he had three older brothers still living, but none of these had shown an interest in claiming the throne for himself. In 1947 Karl's older brothers Leopold and Franz Josef formally renounced their rights in New York City. In 1948 his other brother Anton verbally renounced his rights in Barcelona. (Both Anton and Franz Josef would take up the claim after Karl died, and Anton's son Dominic is the current claimant.)

Karl was recognised by his supporters as Carlos VIII; his movement is therefore called Carloctavismo or Octavismo. He used the title Duke of Madrid as his grandfather had done. Karl received the support of some of the most conservative Carlist leaders. He also received a certain level of support from some of General Franco's officials in the Movimiento Nacional; the followers of the Carlist regent Prince Xavier of Bourbon-Parma claimed that the Francoist support was merely an attempt to divide Carlists.

Karl moved to Andorra and then returned to Barcelona. Between 1944 and 1951 he gave out fourteen titles of nobility; he also named members to the Order of Proscribed Legitimacy and the Order of Saint Mary of the Lily of Navarre. He established a new order of merit named in honour of Saint Charles Borromeo. In 1952 he awarded the collar of this order to General Franco and the grand cross of the order to Federico Cardinal Tedeschini, papal legate to the 35th International Eucharistic Congress in Barcelona.

== Marriage and family ==
On 8 May 1938, in the Cathedral of Saint Stephen in Vienna, Karl married Christa Satzger de Bálványos (1914–2001), daughter of Geza Satzger de Bálványos and of his wife, Maria Alexandrina Friedmann. The marriage was morganatic, and the children born to it had no dynastic rights of succession.

Karl and Christa had two daughters:

- Alejandra Blanca de Habsburgo-Lorena y Satzger (born 20 January 1941, at Viareggio), married in 1960 to José María Riera Leyva (two sons and one daughter).
- María Immaculada Pía de Habsburgo-Lorena y Satzger (born 3 July 1945, at Barcelona), married John Howard Dobkin on 18 Dec 1969 in Arlington, Virginia.

On 30 November 1990, Alejandra and Inmaculada were each given the title Countess of Habsburg (German: Gräfin von Habsburg) by Archduke Otto of Austria.

Christa left Karl in 1949. In December 1950, they received a civil divorce in Reno, Nevada. On 4 January 1951, Karl initiated a process petitioning for an ecclesiastical decree of nullity; the case had not been resolved at his death.

== Death ==
Poblet ledger stone

Karl died of a cerebral hemorrhage 24 December 1953, in Barcelona, Spain. Several funeral masses were celebrated for him, including one on 16 January 1954 in Madrid, attended by numerous government officials and members of the diplomatic corps. He was buried in the Royal Abbey of Santa Maria de Poblet.

== Ancestry ==
Ancestors of Archduke Karl Pius of Austria, Prince of Tuscany

8. Leopold II, Grand Duke of Tuscany
4. Archduke Karl Salvator of Austria
9. Princess Maria Antonia of the Two Sicilies
2. Archduke Leopold Salvator of Austria
10. Ferdinand II of the Two Sicilies
5. Princess Maria Immaculata of Bourbon-Two Sicilies
11. Maria Theresa of Austria
1. Archduke Karl Pius of Austria
12. Juan, Count of Montizón (Carlist Juan III of Spain)
6. Carlos, Duke of Madrid (Carlist Carlos VII of Spain)
13. Archduchess Maria Beatrix of Austria-Este
3. Infanta Blanca of Spain
14. Charles III, Duke of Parma
7. Princess Margherita of Bourbon-Parma
15. Princess Louise Marie Thérèse of Artois

== Bibliography ==
- Las Heras y Borrero, Francisco de. Carlos de Habsburgo, un pretendiente desconocido: El otro candidato de Franco. Madrid: Dykinson, 2004.
- "Archduke Carlos of Spain, Was 44". The New York Times (December 25, 1953): 17.
- Obituary of Christina Sandor
