= Archduke Rainer of Austria (1895–1930) =

Archduke of Austria and Prince of Tuscany

Archduke Rainer
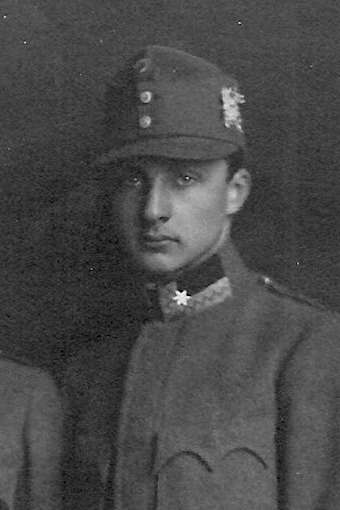
- Rainer in 1917
- Born: 21 November 1895; Agram, Kingdom of Croatia-Slavonia, Austria-Hungary
- Died: 25 May 1930 (aged 34); Vienna, Austria
- House: Habsburg-Tuscany
- Father: Archduke Leopold Salvator of Austria, Prince of Tuscany
- Mother: Princess Blanca of Bourbon

Archduke Rainer of Austria (German: Rainer, Erzherzog von Österreich-Toskana; 21 November 1895 – 25 May 1930) was a member of the House of Habsburg-Lorraine, a member of the Tuscan branch of the Imperial House of Habsburg, an Archduke of Austria and Prince of Tuscany by birth. He was the eldest son Archduke Leopold Salvator of Austria, Prince of Tuscany. He served as officer in the Austrian army during World War I. At the fall of the Habsburg dynasty, he remained in Vienna and worked for a time as taxi driver. He died unmarried at the age of 34 from blood-poisoning.

== Life ==
Archduke Rainer was born in Agram (the historic Austrian-German name for what is now the city of Zagreb in Croatia), the fourth child and eldest son of Archduke Leopold Salvator of Austria, Prince of Tuscany and Princess Blanca of Bourbon (daughter of Carlos, Duke of Madrid). He received the names Rainer Karl Leopold Blanka Anton Margarete Beatrix Peter Joseph Raphael Michael Ignaz Stephan.

During World War I Rainer served as a lieutenant of artillery in the Austro-Hungarian Army. After the fall of the Habsburg monarchy and the establishment of the First Austrian Republic, he renounced his rights to the Austrian throne in order that he could remain in Austria. Henceforward he used the name Rainer Habsburg. He lived in an apartment in the Palais Toskana, but also retained properties in Zagreb, and in Galicia, and at Schloss Hernstein.

In Vienna, Rainer operated a garage. He also organized a system for film reels to be transported by motorcycle from one theater to another enabling more than one theater to share the same film.

In May 1921 it was reported that there had been protests against Rainer at Schloss Hernstein. In August 1921 he was arrested in Ljubljana (then in Yugoslavia, now in Slovenia) on a charge of forging a passport.

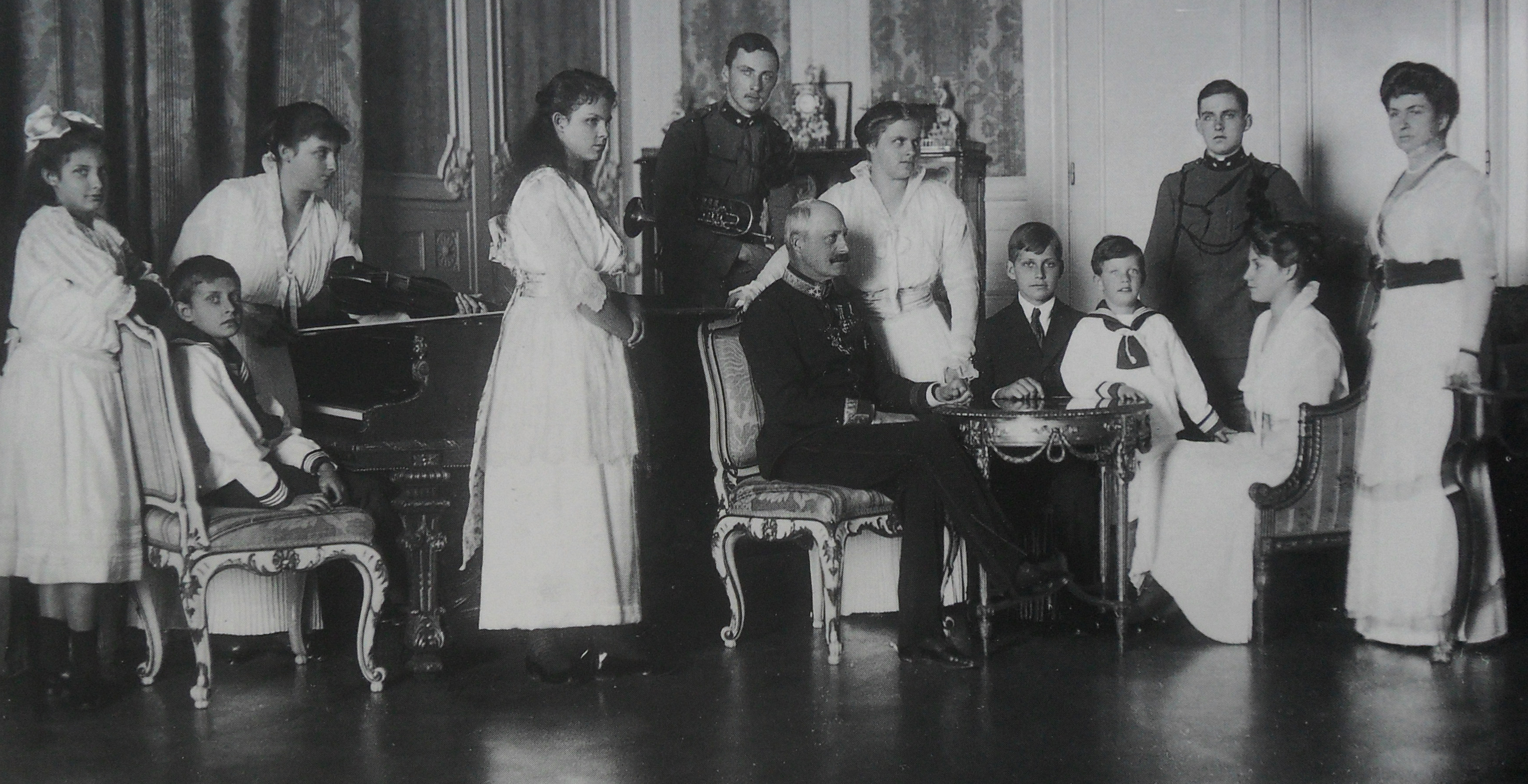
Archduke Rainer and family, 1915

On 6 April 1922, Rainer and his father were present at the requiem mass celebrated in St. Stephen's Cathedral in Vienna for the soul of the Emperor Charles I of Austria. They reportedly led a demonstration with cries of "Down with the Republic", and marched to the Austrian Parliament Building demanding that the flag be lowered to half-staff in honour of Austria's former sovereign.915

In 1930 Rainer died in the Wiedner Hospital in Vienna from the effects of blood poisoning; he was 35. His remains were buried in the Imperial Crypt of the Capuchin Church in Vienna. He was the first member of the Habsburg family to be buried in the crypt since the Emperor Franz Joseph I in 1916. Among those present for the funeral were his parents, Archduke Leopold Salvator and Archduchess Blanca, his father's brother Archduke Franz Salvator of Austria with his sons Hubert and Klemens, his mother's uncle Infante Alfonso Carlos of Spain and his wife Infanta Maria das Neves of Portugal, and Dr. Ignaz Seipel (former Chancellor of Austria).

In 1962 Rainer's sarcophagus was moved to the Neue Gruft (New Crypt) where it lies next to the sarcophagus of his father.

== Ancestry ==
Ancestors of Archduke Rainer of Austria (1895–1930)

8. Leopold II, Grand Duke of Tuscany
4. Archduke Karl Salvator of Austria, Prince of Tuscany
9. Princess Maria Antonia of the Two Sicilies
2. Archduke Leopold Salvator, Prince of Tuscany
10. Ferdinand II of the Two Sicilies
5. Princess Maria Immaculata of Bourbon-Two Sicilies
11. Maria Theresa of Austria
1. Archduke Rainer of Austria, Prince of Tuscany
12. Juan, Count of Montizón
6. Carlos, Duke of Madrid
13. Archduchess Maria Beatrix of Austria-Este
3. Infanta Blanca of Spain
14. Charles III, Duke of Parma
7. Princess Margherita of Bourbon-Parma
15. Princess Louise Marie Thérèse of France
