= Archduke Leopold Salvator of Austria =

Austrian archduke (1863–1931)

Archduke Leopold Salvator
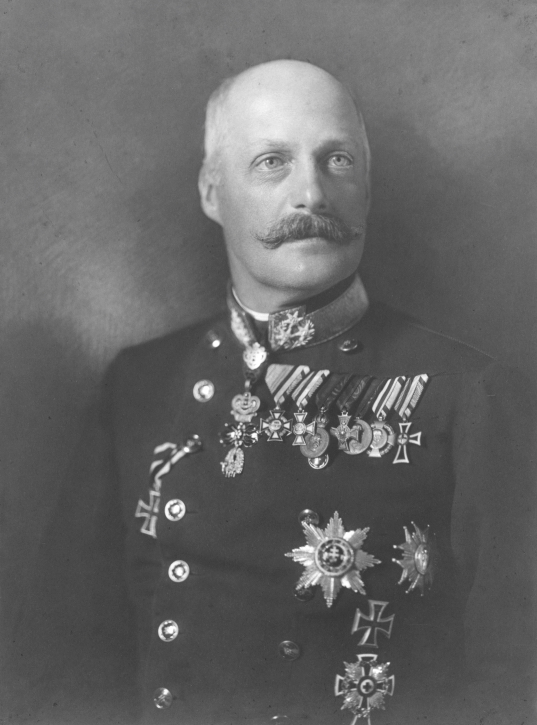
- Leopold Salvator in 1916

Pretender to the Croatian throne
- Pretence: 15 September 1919 – 4 September 1931
- Predecessor: Charles I of Austria
- Successor: None
- Born: 15 October 1863; Stará Boleslav, Bohemia, Austrian Empire
- Died: 4 September 1931 (aged 67); Vienna, Austria
- Spouse: Princess Blanca of Bourbon (m. 1889)
- Issue: Archduchess Dolores; Archduchess Immaculata; Archduchess Margaretha; Archduke Rainer; Archduke Leopold; Archduchess Maria Antonia; Archduke Anton; Archduchess Assunta; Archduke Franz Josef; Archduke Karl Pius
- House: Habsburg-Tuscany
- Father: Archduke Karl Salvator of Austria
- Mother: Princess Maria Immaculata of Bourbon-Two Sicilies

Archduke Leopold Salvator, Prince of Tuscany (Leopold Salvator Maria Joseph Ferdinand Franz von Assisi Karl Anton von Padua Johann Baptist Januarius Aloys Gonzaga Rainer Wenzel Galius von Österreich-Toskana) (15 October 1863 – 4 September 1931), was a member of the House of Habsburg, a General in the Austro-Hungarian Army and candidate for the Croatian crown.

== Family ==
Leopold was born in Stará Boleslav, Bohemia, on 15 October 1863. He was a member of the House of Habsburg-Lorraine, and held the title Archduke of Austria. He was a Knight in the Order of the Golden Fleece and was awarded Order of the White Eagle.

He was nicknamed “the Croatian Archduke” for his strong connection with Croatia (he lived in Zagreb for 6 years).

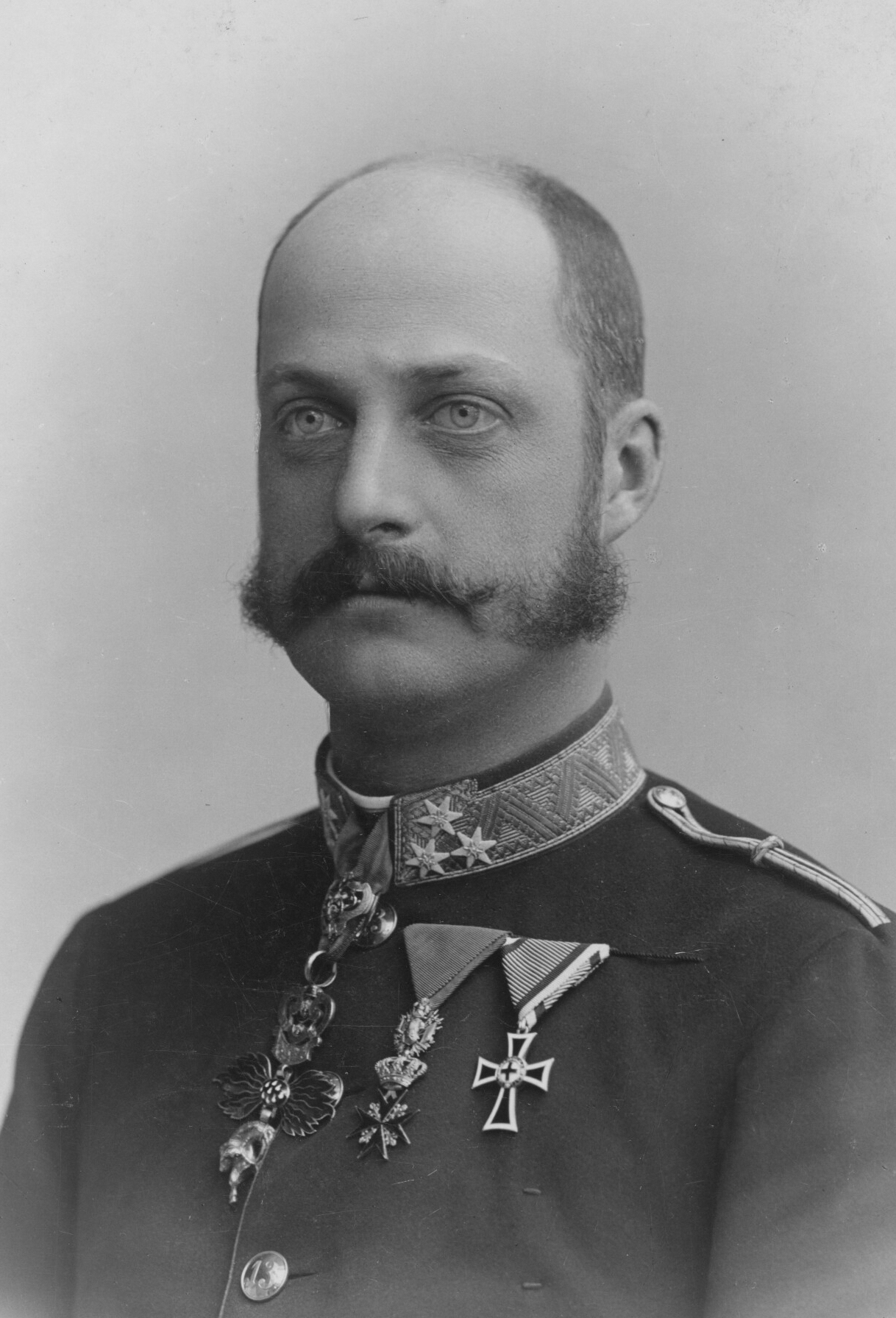
Archduke Leopold Salvator in 1902.

=== Marriage and issue ===
On October 24, 1889, Leopold Salvator married Princess Blanca of Bourbon (1868-1949), eldest daughter of Infante Carlos, Duke of Madrid. They had 10 children:

- Archduchess Dolores of Austria (5 May 1891 – 10 April 1974)
- Archduchess Immaculata of Austria (9 September 1892 – 3 September 1971); married in 1932 Nobile Igino Neri-Serneri.
- Archduchess Margaretha of Austria (8 May 1894 – 21 January 1986); married in 1937 Marquess Francesco Maria Taliani de Marchio.
- Archduke Rainer of Austria (21 November 1895 – 25 May 1930)
- Archduke Leopold of Austria (30 January 1897 – 14 March 1958); married morganatically in 1919 Dagmar Baroness Nicolics-Podrinska; they were married until 1931. He married secondly in 1932 (also morganatically) Alicia Gibson Coburn.
- Archduchess Maria Antonia of Austria (13 July 1899 – 22 October 1977); married in 1924 Don Ramón de Orlandis y Villalonga (died 1936); married secondly in 1942 Luis Perez Sucre.
- Archduke Anton of Austria (20 March 1901 – 22 October 1987); was married from 1931 to 1954 to Princess Ileana of Romania.
- Archduchess Assunta of Austria (10 August 1902 – 24 January 1993); was married from 1939 to 1950 to Joseph Hopfinger.
- Archduke Franz Josef of Austria (4 February 1905 – 9 May 1975); married morganatically in 1937 Maria Aloisa Baumer; the marriage ended the following year in 1938. He married secondly in 1962 (also morganatically) Maria Elena Seunig.
- Archduke Karl Pius of Austria (4 December 1909 – 24 December 1953); was married from 1938 to 1950 to Christa Satzger de Bálványos.

== Candidate to the Croatian throne ==
Monarchical styles of Archduke Leopold Salvator of Austria
- Reference style: His Imperial and Royal Highness
- Spoken style: Your Imperial and Royal Highness

On 10 November 1894, the Archduke Leopold Salvator and his family settled in Zagreb, Croatia’s capital. The Archduke spoke Croatian fluently and became very popular in his new place. At the birth of Archduke Rainier in November 1895, the Croatian press hailed the birth of the “first prince born in Croatia“.

The Archduke’s family integrated very quickly in Zagreb and created a semblance of a royal court, which delights the local population. Leopold Salvator and his family lived at Vranyczany Palace.

Leopold Salvator was known as one of the strongest supporter of Trialism, he was regularly considered to become the emperor's official representative in Zagreb. Faced with this support, which disturbed Hungary, the archduke was moved from Zagreb to Vienna in 1900.

In 1914, he was the target of an assassination attempt at the Zagreb theatre. A few years later, in 1919, a plot to make Croatia an independent kingdom with Archduke Leopold Salvator as king failed.

== Ancestry ==
Ancestors of Archduke Leopold Salvator of Austria

8. Ferdinand III, Grand Duke of Tuscany
4. Leopold II, Grand Duke of Tuscany
9. Princess Luisa of Naples and Sicily
2. Archduke Karl Salvator of Austria
10. Francis I of the Two Sicilies
5. Princess Maria Antonia of the Two Sicilies
11. Infanta Maria Isabella of Spain
1. Archduke Leopold Salvator of Austria
12. Francis I of the Two Sicilies (= 10)
6. Ferdinand II of the Two Sicilies
13. Infanta Maria Isabella of Spain (= 11)
3. Princess Maria Immacolata of Bourbon-Two Sicilies
14. Archduke Charles, Duke of Teschen
7. Archduchess Maria Theresa of Austria
15. Princess Henrietta of Nassau-Weilburg
