= Hernstein =

- Municipality
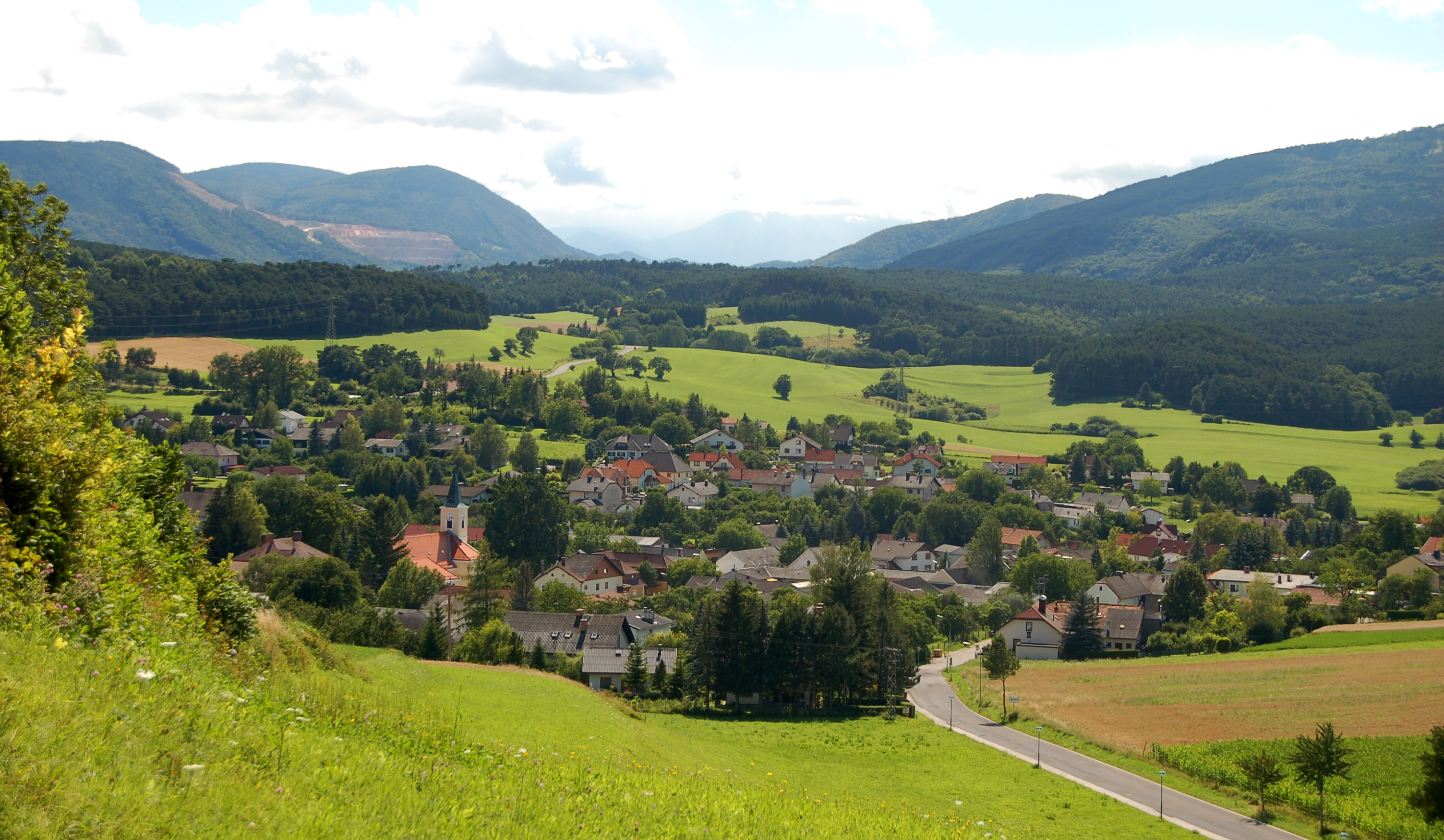
- View of Hernstein

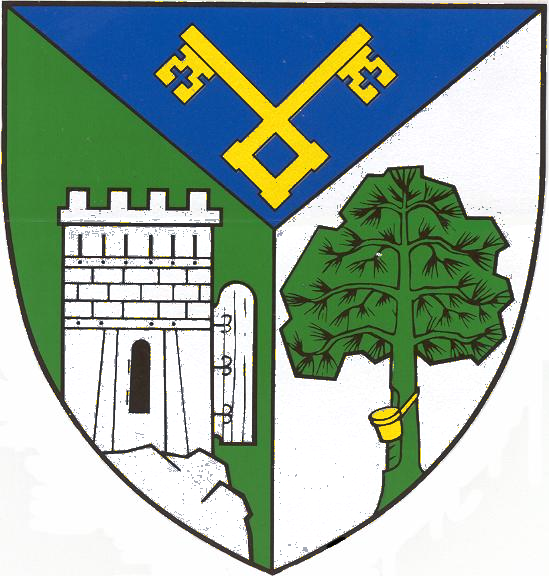
- Coat of arms

- Location within Austria
- Coordinates: 47°53′N 16°6′E
- Country: Austria
- State: Lower Austria
- District: Baden

Government
  - Mayor: Leopold Nebel

Area
  - Total: 46.6336 km^{2} (18.0053 sq mi)
- Elevation: 438 m (1,437 ft)

Population (2021)
  - Total: 1,567
  - Density: 33.60/km^{2} (87.03/sq mi)
- Time zone: UTC+1 (CET)
  - Summer (DST): UTC+2 (CEST)
- Postal code: 2560
- Area code: 02633, 02672
- Website: www.hernstein.gv.at

Hernstein is a town in Lower Austria, Austria in the district of Baden bei Wien.

== Municipal divisions ==
The market municipality of Hernstein has seven Katastralgemeinden:

- Grillenberg
- Hernstein
  - Alkersdorf (district)
  - Aigen (district)
- Kleinfeld
- Neusiedl bei Grillenberg
- Pöllau
- Steinhof
- Veitsau

(In contrast the districts of Steinhof und Veitsau are almost in the neighboring community of Berndorf)

== Population ==
Historical population
Year	Pop.	±%
1971	1,097	—
1981	1,191	+8.6%
1991	1,305	+9.6%
2001	1,421	+8.9%
2011	1,508	+6.1%
