= Palais Toskana =

Coordinates: 48.1948°N 16.3734°E

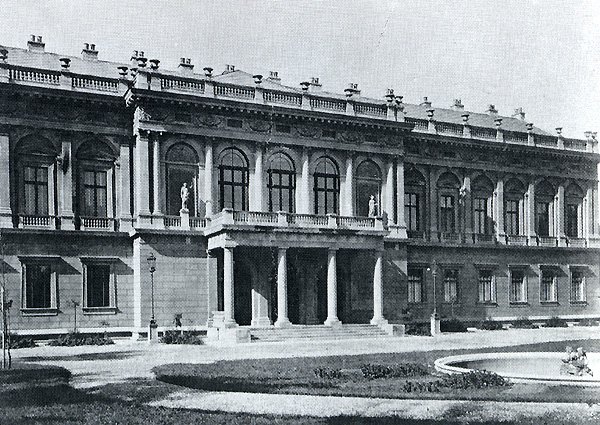
Palais Toskana, early 1900

The Palais Toskana was a palace in Vienna.

== History ==
It was constructed in 1867 for the Archduke Leopold Salvator of Austria. The architect is unknown; the facade may have been designed by Carl Tietz. The palace was up to four stories high, and was built in neo-classic style with elaborate figural decoration in its middle part. In the back part, there was a large garden which extended all the way to that of the Palais Rothschild. The palace was slightly damaged during World War II. The descendants of the archduke could not afford the repair costs and sold the estate. The palace was then torn down. For decades, the palace location was used as a parking lot by employees of the ORF public broadcasting company. Recently an undistinguished modern building has been constructed there.
