= Princess Beatrice of Bourbon =

Princess Béatrice
- Princess of Roviano
- Beatrice in 1894
- Born: 21 March 1874; Pau, France
- Died: 1 November 1961 (aged 87); Lucca, Italy
- Burial: Tenuta Reale, Italy
- Spouse: Fabrizio Massimo (m. 1897; died 1944)
- Issue: Donna Margherita Massimo; Donna Fabiola Massimo; Donna Maria della Nieves Massimo; Donna Bianca Massimo
Names
- French: Marie Béatrice Thérèse Charlotte de Bourbon; Spanish: María Beatriz Teresa Carlotta de Borbón
- House: Bourbon
- Father: Prince Carlos, Duke of Madrid
- Mother: Princess Margherita of Bourbon-Parma

Princess Béatrice of Bourbon (In French: Princesse Marie-Béatrice Thérèse Charlotte de Bourbon; Spanish: María Beatriz Teresa Carlotta de Borbón; 21 March 1874 – 1 November 1961) was the third daughter and fourth child of Prince Carlos, Duke of Madrid, the Carlist claimant to the throne of Spain and the Legitimist claimant to the throne of France, and Princess Margherita of Bourbon-Parma.

Princess of Bourbon by birth and, by marriage to the head of a cadet branch of the House Massimo, the Princess of Roviano, Duchess of Anticoli Corrado. Although her hand in marriage was sought at various times for the sovereigns to the thrones of Bulgaria and the defunct thrones of Two-Sicilies and Portugal (Miguelist claim), no such marriage or alliance materialized, as Béatrice was in loved with her futur husband Fabrizio.

Beatrice was educated by nuns in the Sacre Coeur convent school in Florence, chosen by her mother, and her close friend and lady-in-waiting Baroness Emma von Reischach. Her childhood was spent with her parents, travelling between a variety of residences in France, Austria and Italy. The intimate atmosphere of the exiled court came to an end on 29 January 1893, when her mother died and her father become distant with his children. The question of Beatrice's marriage was discussed in the early 1890s. Suitors from the royal houses of Portugal and Bulgaria were suggested, but Beatrice did not want to marry a foreign prince, as she was in love with her mother's half first-cousin, Prince Fabrizio Massimo. Some years later, on 27 February 1897, Beatrice and the impoverished Prince Fabrizio Massimo were married. The couple remained in Italy, in relative distance of Beatrice’s father. After a happy beginning, the couple drifted apart, because of Fabrizio’s numerous affairs. In 1906, they got separated and Beatrice moved to her maternal uncle’s castle, Schloss Schwarzau in Austria.

Following her father’s death in 1909, she entered the social circle established by her elder brother, the new claimant, Prince Jaime. Beatrice’s marriage with Fabrizio survived thanks to the birth of four daughters; they reconciled in the late 1900s, and Beatrice and her daughters went to live in Rome. After the First World War, she began to retire from public life, undertaking few public duties in Spain or Italy, where she died at the age of 87.

== Early life ==
Beatrice was born at 10:00 am on 21 March 1874 at Villa Ader, Pau, France. She was the third daughter and four child of the carliste and legitimist claimant, Prince Carlos of Bourbon, and his wife, Princess Margherita of Bourbon-Parma. Her birth coincided with the Third Carlist War, in which her father tried to became king of Spain.

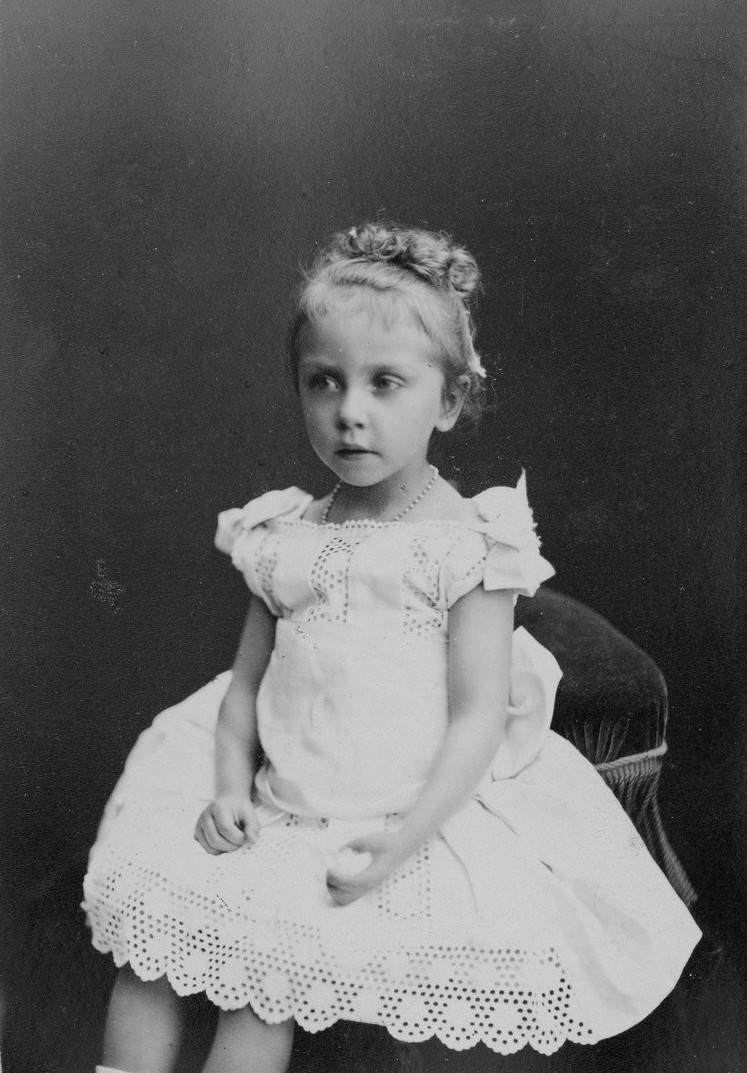
Princess Béatrice in 1878 by French photographer Nadar.

Carlos and Margherita chose the names Marie Béatrice Carmen Pilar Thérèse Charlotte Louise Jacoba Fernande Jeanne Marguerite Philomène Josèphe Blanche Eloïse Anne Michèle Gabrielle Raphaël Berenguel Léonore Jésus de Benoîte. She was baptised on 25 March in the private chapel at Villa Ader by Cardinal Ferdinand-François-Auguste Donnet, the Archbishop of Bordeaux, in a great ceremony with a huge crowd. Her godparents were Duke Charles II of Parma (her maternal great-grandfather, for whom Princess Margherita stood proxy) and the Duchess Maria Teresa of Parma (her maternal great-grandmother, for whom the Princess Margherita stood proxy).

Like her siblings, Louise was brought up in the Sacre Coeur convent school in Paris chosen by her mother, Princess Margherita, and her close friend and lady-in-waiting Baroness Emma von Reischach. When her father, Prince Carlos, lost the war in 1876, the family moved in Paris, although her father went in South America. Beatrice was closed to her siblings, especially Blanca, with whom she played music. In 1881, the French government banished them because of Carlos's political activities.

Her parents separated around that time. Beatrice's father went to live in Venice, while Marghertia and the children went to live in the Tenuta Reale, the ancient Tuscan residence of the Dukes of Parma in Viareggio. Beatrice and her sisters attended the Sacre Coeur convent school in Florence. The children were very close to their mother, who had decided to place generosity and kindness at the heart of her children's education. At the end of her education, Beatrice’s speak French, Spanish, German and Italian.

== Marriage and children ==
=== Suitors ===
Princesses Beatrice (right) and Alice (left) with their brother Prince Jaime (middle), late 1890s

As the daughter of Don Carlos, Beatrice was not a desirable bride; more so as she is regarded as one of Don Carlos’ less beautiful daughter by contemporaries, alongside with her eldest sister Elvira. However, in 1883, Beatrice’s maternal great-uncle the Count of Chambord, legitimist claimant to the French throne, died and his huge fortune was separated in four pieces, one for the Duke Robert I of Parma (Beatrice’s maternal uncle), one for Princess Margherita, Duchess of Madrid (Beatrice’s mother), another one for both Prince Henri, Count of Bardi (Beatrice’s maternal uncle) and Grand Duchess Alice of Tuscany (Beatrice’s maternal aunt), and the last for his widow. Finally, in 1886, the Countess of Chambord died and her fortune was largely inherited by Beatrice’s parents and siblings. As her family wealth became important during the late 1880s, various suitors were proposed by the leading royal houses of Europe: Princess Maria das Neves (Beatrice’s paternal aunt-by-law) proposed her brother, the Infante Miguel, Duke of Braganza and miguelist claimant, but Don Carlos’ disapproved it. Princess Francesca Massimo, Beatrice’s maternal great-aunt, proposed her second son, the impoverished Prince Fabrizio Massimo, but Don Carlos disapproved it strongly, as Fabrizio was not born into a royal family, too poor and had a bad morality. Ferdinand, Prince of Bulgaria, was also interested to marry Beatrice for her dowry (around 400,000 francs), but because of his extravagant lifestyle in Europe, where he was known as bisexual, Beatrice’s parents quickly vetoed the idea. In fact, Queen Victoria, Ferdinand’s father's first cousin, stated to her prime minister, "He is totally unfit ... delicate, eccentric and effeminate ... Should be stopped at once." Beatrice herself described him as "likable, though it’s a pity he speaks that way." Princess Beatrice, alongside with her sisters Elvira and Alice were considered as potential bride for Prince Ferdinand, Duke of Calabria. Around 1895-1896, she was also considered as a potential bride for Alfred, Hereditary Prince of Saxe-Coburg and Gotha, but her father refused the idea of his daughter marrying a Protestant. There is no evidence that Alfred ever met Beatrice, but her grandmother Archduchess Maria Beatrix of Austria wrote "I would have been devastated if one of my granddaughters had married him."

Beatrice’s mother, Princess Margherita, died at the Tenuta Reale on 29 January 1893. Her children were devastated, and their father ordered the household to move from Viareggio to Palazzo Loredan on Venice. This put an end to all marriage negotiations for Beatrice.

=== Engagement and wedding ===
However, on 3 January 1897, aged 22, the Marquis Urbain de Maillé, representative of Don Carlos in France, announced her engagement to the Italian nobleman Fabrizio Massimo, Prince of Roviano and Duke of Anticoli Corrado. They were cousins (specifically, Fabrizio was a half-first-cousin of her mother Margherita), and both descended from Beatrice's great-grandmother, Marie-Caroline, Duchess of Berry. Beatrice was in love with Prince Fabrizio Massimo from several years before their engagement was announced. For Francisco, Count of Melgar, it was an idea of Beatrice step-mother, Princess Berthe of Rohan, with whom the children of Don Carlos had a very bad relationship.

Beatrice and Fabrizio on their engagement, 1897.

Beatrice and Fabrizio were married a month later, on 27 February 1897, at 11am, in the reception room, transformed into a Chapel of the Patriachate of Venice, by Cardinal Sarto, the future Pope Pius X. He would also marry Beatrice's younger sister a month later. Princess Beatrice was escorted into the chapel by her father, and her eldest brother, Prince Jaime. The bride’s witnesses were her eldest brother Jaime, and her maternal uncle, Prince Henri, Count of Bardi. Those of Fabrizio were his father, The Prince of Arsoli and his uncle, The Duke of Grazia. Their civil marriage was signed at the Venice City Hall by the mayor, Count Grimani. The new royal couple received over 200 telegrams of congratulations (150 of them from Carlist and 50 from sovereigns, royals, and nobility). Among them, the Princess of Bulgaria, first cousin of Beatrice wrote :

"Bravo! I'm so happy for your well-deserved happiness: may God protect you both! I sincerely hope the new year starts well. Hugs - Maria-Luisa".

Despite Fabrizio family connection with Royal Houses from Italy, Two-Sicilies and Saxony, he wasn’t considered as “equal” and Beatrice’s marriage was technically morganatic in Spain, even if no one talk about it, as Fabrizio was a third cousin of the King of Italy. However, Beatrice’s dowry has become a problem. Despite the promise to receive 400,000 francs, Beatrice receives only a third of it. As Fabrizio was poor, it became the first breakup of their marriage.

The couple lived in Rome, in the Palazzo Massimo alle Colonne, and had four daughters:

1. Donna Margherita Massimo (31 July 1898 – 1922), who married Count Emiliano Pagliano, who was an advisor at the Italian ambassy in Madrid.
2. Donna Fabiola Massimo (27 July 1900 – 1983), who married Baron Enzo Galli Zugaro, and had four children.
3. Donna Maria della Nieves Massimo (12 January 1902 – 20 June 1984), who married Charles Percy. She donated the heart of Louis XVII to the Royal Basilica of Saint Denis.
4. Donna Bianca Massimo (16 April 1906 – 22 January 1999), who married Count Paul von Wurmbrand-Stuppach, and had a child.

== Princess Massimo ==
=== Suicide attempt ===
On 5 May 1902, after a heated argument with her husband, Princess Beatrice attempted suicide by throwing herself in the Tiber river. She was rescued by the Roman municipal guard, who had been alerted by the cries of an elderly woman who witnessed the scene. The princess was taken to the Hospital of the Holy Spirit, where she received first aid. After giving her statement about what had happened, she was taken to the Palazzo Massimo alle Colonne.

=== Death ===
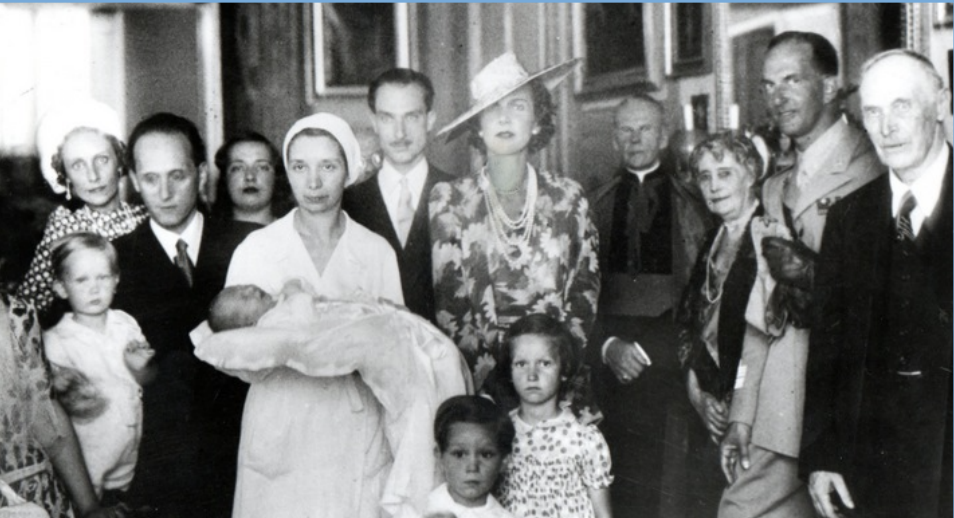
The baptism of Umberto Galli Zugaro, Béatrice's grandson, 1940.

Princess Beatrice became a widow in 1944. She finally died in Lucca, Italy, in November 1961. She was 87 years old.

== Titles, styles, honours and arms ==
=== Titles and styles ===
Styles of Béatrice, Princess of Roviano
- Reference style: Her Royal Highness
- Spoken style: Your Royal Highness

- 21 March 1874 — 27 February 1897: Her Royal Highness Princess Beatrice of Bourbon
- 27 February 1897 — 14 April 1904: Her Royal Highness The Princess of Roviano, Duchess of Anticoli-Corrado, Princess Massimo
- 14 April 1904 — 1 November 1961: Her Royal Highness Princess Beatrice Massimo

=== Honours ===
- (Austria-Hungary) Dame of the Order of the Starry Cross
- (Kingdom of Bavaria) Dame of the Order of Saint Elizabeth

== Ancestry ==
Ancestors of Princess Beatrice of Bourbon

8. Infante Carlos María Isidro of Spain
4. Prince Juan, Count of Montizón
9. Infanta Maria Francisca of Portugal
2. Prince Carlos, Duke of Madrid
10. Francis IV, Duke of Modena
5. Archduchess Maria Beatrix of Austria-Este
11. Princess Maria Beatrice of Savoy
1. Beatrice of Bourbon
12. Charles II, Duke of Parma
6. Charles III, Duke of Parma
13. Princess Maria Teresa of Savoy
3. Princess Margherita of Bourbon-Parma
14. Prince Charles Ferdinand, Duke of Berry
7. Princess Louise of France
15. Princess Maria Carolina of Naples and Sicily

== Sources ==
- Adelsarchiv, Deutsches (2015). Gothaisches Genealogisches Handbuch: Fürstliche Häuser (in German). Marburg: Verlag des Deutschen Adelsarchivs. ISBN 978-3981724301.
- Bernasconi, Edoardo (1920). I matrimoni della Real Casa di Borbone (in Italian). Milan: Berruti.
- McNaughton, Arnold (1973). The Book of Kings: A Royal Genealogy. London: Garnstone Press. ISBN 0-900391-19-7.
- Volkmann, Jean-Charles (1998). Généalogies des rois et des princes d'Europe (in French). Paris: Éditions Jean-Paul Gisserot. ISBN 978-2877473743.

Princess Beatrice of Bourbon House of Bourbon-Anjou Cadet branch of the House of Bourbon Born: 21 March 1874 Died: 1 November 1961
Royal titles
Preceded by Paola Lucchesi-Palli	Princess of Roviano; 27 February 1897 - 14 April 1904	Succeeded by Adelaide of Savoy-Genoa
