= Princess Alice of Bourbon =

Spanish royal and Italian noblewoman (1876–1975)

Princess Alice
- Princess of Schönburg Waldenburg; Mrs. Del Prete
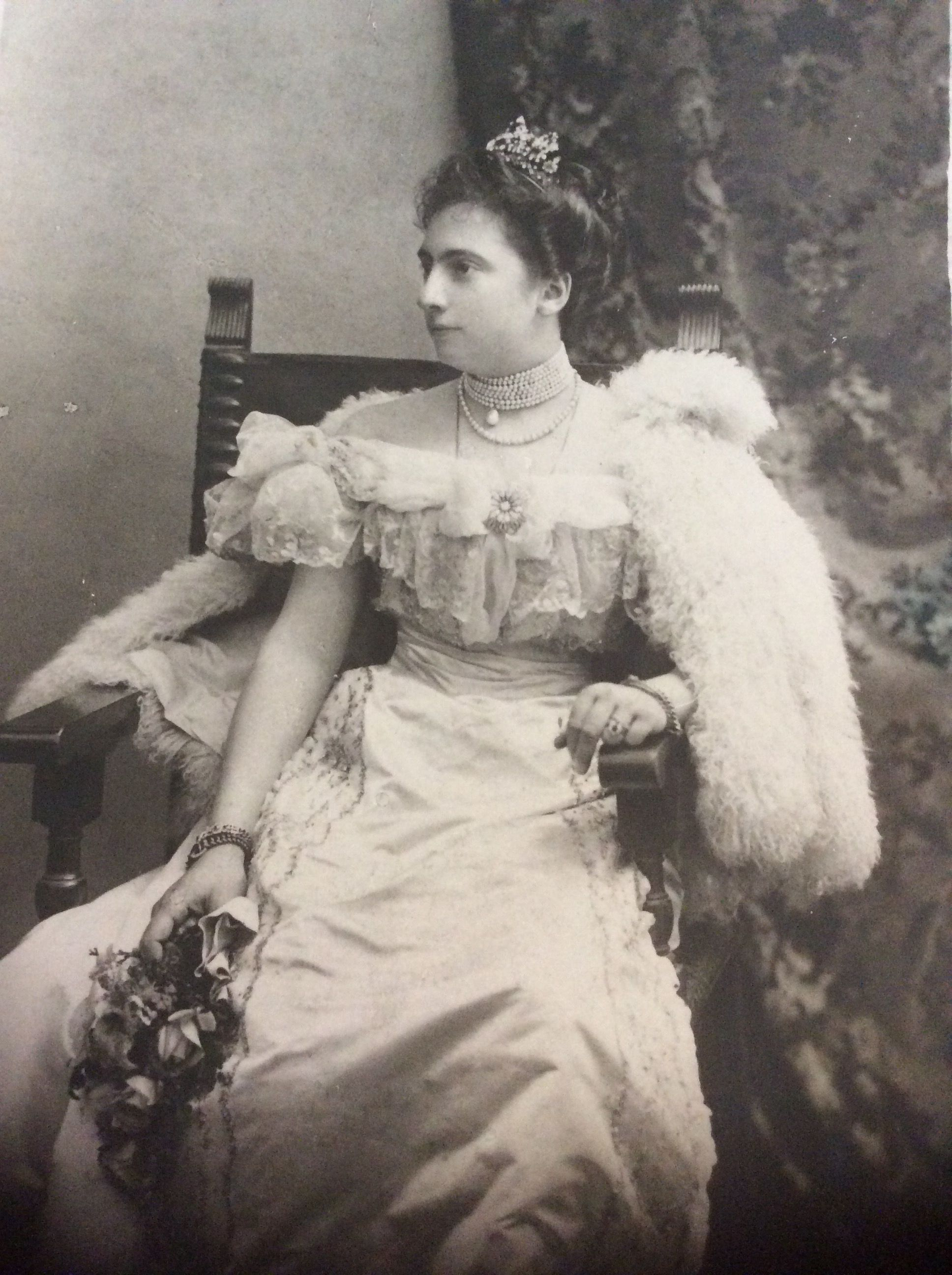
- Photograph of princess Alice, 1897
- Born: 29 June 1876; Pau, Pyrénées-Atlantiques, France
- Died: 20 January 1975 (aged 98); Bargecchia, Lucca, Italy
- Burial: Viareggio, Tuscany, Italy
- Spouse: Prince Friedrich of Schönburg-Waldenburg (m. 1897; ann. 1903) Lino del Prete (m. 1906; died 1956)
- Issue: Prince Karl Leopold of Schönburg-Waldenburg; Margarita del Prete; Giorgio del Prete; Cristina del Prete; Beatriz del Prete; Luisa del Prete; Francisca del Prete; Ernestina del Prete; Francisco del Prete; Valentina del Prete
Names
- María Alicia Ildefonsa Carolina Blanca Elvira Beatriz Petra Pauline de Borbón y Borbón-Parma
- House: Bourbon
- Father: Prince Carlos, Duke of Madrid
- Mother: Princess Margherita of Bourbon-Parma
- Religion: Roman Catholicism

Princess Alice of Bourbon (Spanish: Alicia de Borbón y Borbón-Parma; French: Princesse Alice de Bourbon; 29 June 1876 – 20 January 1975) was a member of the Spanish senior branch of the House of Bourbon by birth, by first marriage to a prince of the House of Schönburg, and then Mrs. Del Prete, after her second marriage.

== Early life ==
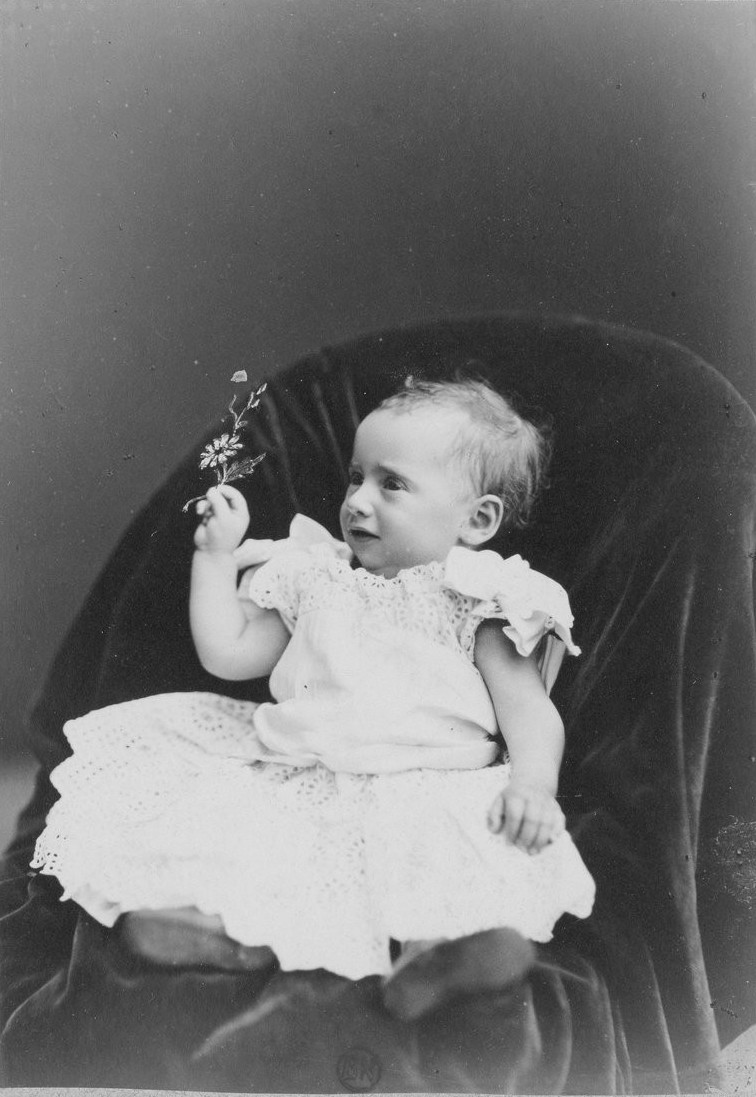
Photographed by Hofatelier Elvira, 1878

Princess Alice was born on 29 June 1876 in Pau, France, near the Spanish border.. She was raised in Paris on the Rue de la Pompe until 1881, when she relocated to the Tenuta Reale estate in Viareggio, Tuscany, following the separation of her parents. Her name was given after her maternal aunt Princess Alice of Bourbon-Parma.

She completed her domestic education at the Sacré-Cœur convent institution in Florence and later pursued secondary training at the Trinità dei Monti convent institution in Rome.

Following her mother's death in 1893, her father remarried Princess Berthe de Rohan in 1894.

== First marriage and scandal ==
Styles of Alice, Princess of Schönburg-Waldenburg
- Reference style: Her Royal Highness
- Spoken style: Your Royal Highness

On 26 April 1897, Princess Alice married dynastically to Prince Friedrich of Schönburg-Waldenburg at the Loredan Palace in Venice, with the ceremony solemnized by Cardinal Giuseppe Sarto (the future Pope Pius X). He was the only son of Prince Karl Ernst of Schönburg-Waldenburg and Princess Helene of Stolberg-Wernigerode, having formally converted to Catholicism on 5 June 1895.. Following their marriage, the couple established their urban residence at Gauernitz Castle, an ancestral property of her husband's family in the Kingdom of Saxony.. Together, they had one son:

- Prince Karl Leopold of Schönburg-Waldenburg (1902–1992); married twice, had children from the second marriage.

During the Boxer Rebellion in 1900 and the Russo-Japanese War in 1904, Princess Alice participated actively as an international field nurse under the auspices of the Russian Red Cross with imperial authorization. During these hospital services, she established a close personal alliance with Princess Eleonore Reuss of Köstritz, the future Tsaritsa of Bulgaria.

In November 1903, Princess Alice fled her marriage and publicized her domestic grievances within international press outlets, including L'Indépendance Belge, citing severe domestic abuse, assault, and physical violence by her husband. She successfully secured a civil divorce in Dresden based on assault and unlawful confinement. The marriage was formally annulled by the Holy See on 26 May 1906.

== Second marriage ==
On 2 June 1906, following her papal annulment, Alice married the Italian commoner Lino del Prete (1877–1956) in a private chapel in Viareggio. The couple established their domestic household in Bargecchia, Tuscany, and produced nine children:

- Margarita del Prete (1904–1938), married Michele Signorini in 1934 and without issue.
- Giorgio del Prete (1905–1928).
- Cristina del Prete (1907–1982), married Alberto Picchiani in 1938 and leaving issue.
- Beatriz del Prete (1908–1944), married Raffaele Casertano in 1936 and leaving issue.
- Luisa del Prete (1909–1990).
- Francisca del Prete (1911–1941), married Domenico Ravera in 1938 and leaving issue.
- Ernestina del Prete (1915–1995).
- Francisco del Prete (1918–1995), married Maria Palestrino in 1944 and leaving issue.
- Valentina del Prete (1922–2021), married Carlo Arezzo della Targia in 1942 and leaving issue.

== World War I and later life ==
In 1915, following the outbreak of World War I, Princess Alice volunteered as a nurse at the hospital infrastructure in Viareggio and was promoted to supervisor of the voluntary nursing staff, holding the position until the armistice. In 1916, she faced temporary, unproven political allegations of espionage in favor of the Austrian Empire due to her nursing activities.

Following her husband's death in 1956, Alice formally signed a dynastic declaration on 11 April 1964 as the senior surviving daughter of the lineage, officially recognizing her cousin Prince Alfonso de Bourbon as the legitimate heir to the Carlist and Legitimist claims. Alice died at the age of 98 on 20 January 1975 in Bargecchia. She was interred in the private Del Prete family chapel within the Camposanto della Misericordia in Viareggio, Tuscany.

== Honors ==
=== Kingdom of Bavaria ===
- Dame of the Order of Saint Elizabeth.
- Dame of the Order of Theresa.

=== Principality of Bulgaria ===
- Recipient of the Commemorative Medal for the Wedding of Prince Ferdinand I and Marie Louise of bourbon-Parma (1893).

=== Russian Empire ===
- Sister of Charity of the Red Cross (1900).

== Ancestry ==
Ancestors of Princess Alice of Bourbon

8. Infante Carlos María Isidro of Spain
4. Prince Juan, Count of Montizón
9. Infanta Maria Francisca of Portugal
2. Prince Carlos, Duke of Madrid
10. Francis IV, Duke of Modena
5. Archduchess Maria Beatrix of Austria-Este
11. Princess Maria Beatrice of Savoy
1. Alice of Bourbon
12. Charles II, Duke of Parma
6. Charles III, Duke of Parma
13. Princess Maria Teresa of Savoy
3. Princess Margherita of Bourbon-Parma
14. Prince Charles Ferdinand, Duke of Berry
7. Princess Louise of France
15. Princess Maria Carolina of Naples and Sicily

== Bibliography ==
- Adelsarchiv, Deutsches (2015). Gothaisches Genealogisches Handbuch: Fürstliche Häuser (in German). Marburg: Verlag des Deutschen Adelsarchivs. ISBN 978-3981724301.
- Bernasconi, Edoardo (1920). I matrimoni della Real Casa di Borbone (in Italian). Milan: Berruti.
- McNaughton, Arnold (1973). The Book of Kings: A Royal Genealogy. London: Garnstone Press. ISBN 0-900391-19-7.
- Volkmann, Jean-Charles (1998). Généalogies des rois et des princes d'Europe (in French). Paris: Éditions Jean-Paul Gisserot. ISBN 978-2877473743.
- Aronson, Theo (1986). Crowns in Conflict: The Triumph and the Tragedy of European Monarchy 1910–1918. London: John Murray. ISBN 978-0719542794.
