= Prince Carlos, Duke of Madrid =

Carlos de Borbón y Austria-Este
- Duke of Madrid
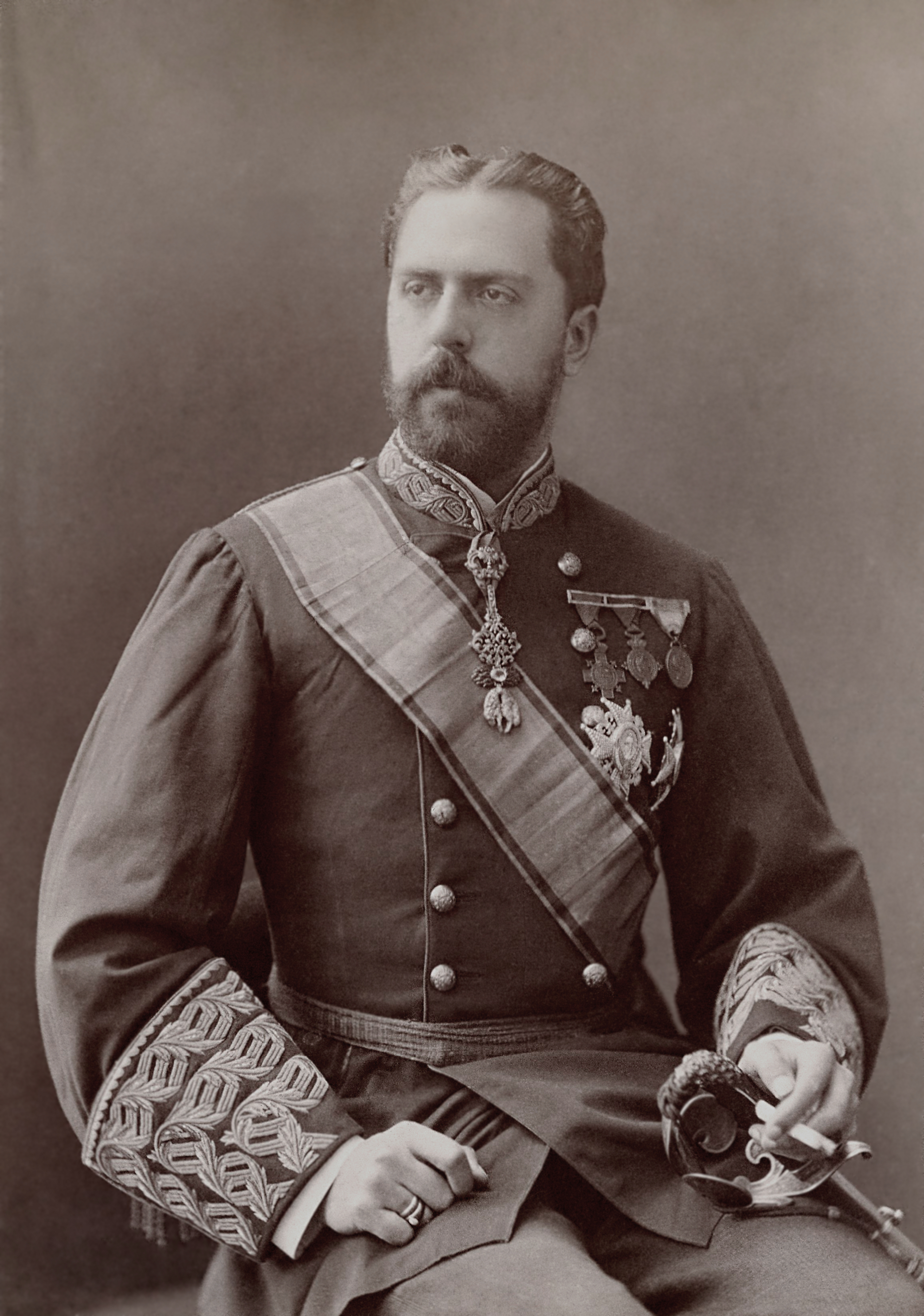
- Photograph by Nadar

Carlist pretender to the Spanish throne
- Pretence: 3 October 1868 – 18 July 1909
- Predecessor: Prince Juan, Count of Montizón
- Successor: Prince Jaime, Duke of Anjou and Madrid

Legitimist claimant to the French throne
- Pretence: 18 November 1887 – 18 July 1909
- Predecessor: Prince Juan, Count of Montizón
- Successor: Prince Jaime, Duke of Anjou and Madrid
- Born: 3 April 1848; Ljubljana, Carniola
- Died: 18 July 1909 (aged 61); Varese, Italy
- Burial: Trieste Cathedral
- Spouse: Princess Margherita of Parma (m. 1867; died 1893) Princess Berthe de Rohan (m. 1894)
- Issue: Princess Blanca, Archduchess Leopold Salvator of Austria; Prince Jaime, Duke of Anjou and Madrid; Princess Elvira of Bourbon; Princess Beatrice, Princess of Roviano; Princess Alice, Princess Friedrich of Schönburg-Waldenburg
Names
- Spanish: Don Carlos María de los Dolores Juan Isidro José Francisco Quirico Antonio Miguel Gabriel Rafael de Borbón y Austria-Este; French: Charles Marie des Douleurs Jean Isidore Joseph François Cyr Antoine Michel Gabriel Raphaël de Bourbon
- House: Bourbon-Anjou
- Father: Prince Juan, Count of Montizón
- Mother: Archduchess Maria Béatrix of Austria-Este

Don Carlos de Borbón y Austria-Este (Spanish: Carlos María de los Dolores Juan Isidro José Francisco Quirico Antonio Miguel Gabriel Rafael; French: Charles Marie des Douleurs Jean Isidore Joseph François Cyr Antoine Michel Gabriel Raphaël; 30 March 1848 – 18 July 1909) was the Carlist claimant to the throne of Spain as Carlos VII from 1868 (his father's Spanish renunciation), and holder of the Legitimist claim to the throne of France under the name Charles XI after the death of his father in 1887.

== Life ==
The Countess of Montizon with her sons Carlos and Alfonso Carlos around 1850.

Carlos was born in Ljubljana, the capital of Carniola in what is now Slovenia, the elder son of Prince Juan, Count of Montizón and of his wife Maria Beatrix of Austria-Este. His name in full was Carlos María de los Dolores Juan Isidro José Francisco Quirico Antonio Miguel Gabriel Rafael. As an infant he lived with his family briefly in London where his younger brother Alfonso was born. After their father, considered too liberal for Carlist tastes, left their mother, the boys lived with her in Modena. Her brother Francis V, Duke of Modena was largely responsible for the education of the boys and was the chief influence in their early lives. Carlos was known for his Traditionalist views, much different from those of his father.

== Family ==
On 4 February 1867, at Schloss Frohsdorf in Austria, Carlos married Princess Margherita of Parma, daughter of Carlos III, Duke of Parma and of his wife, Princess Louise Marie Thérèse of France. The couple had five children:

- Princess Blanca of Bourbon (1868–1949) m in 1889 at Frohsdorf Archduke Leopold Salvator of Austria, Prince of Tuscany and had issue.
- Prince Jaime, Duke of Anjou and Madrid (1870–1931)
- Princess Elvira of Bourbon (1871–1929) died unmarried (but with illegitimate issue who took the surname "de Bourbon", by artist Filippo Folchi).
- Princess Beatrice of Bourbon (1874–1961) married in Venice in 1892 Prince Fabrizio Massimo di Roviano (his mother was Donna Francesca di Paola Lucchesi-Palli, daughter of Princess Caroline of Naples and Sicily and her second husband Ettore Lucchesi-Palli, 8th Duke della Grazia)
- Princess Alice of Bourbon (1876–1975) married (1) in 1897 Prince Victor Friedrich Ernst von Schönburg-Waldenburg (1872-1910) at Venice and had issue, divorced 1903; (2) in 1906 at Viareggio, Lino del Prete (1877-1956) and had issue.

== De facto king ==
Carlos organized and led the Third Carlist War. Between 1872 and 1876 he effectively controlled much of peninsular Spain, having as much legitimacy as the Presidents of the First Republic.

== Later life ==
In January 1893 Carlos' wife, Margherita, died. The following year he decided to remarry. He consulted his mother who suggested two ladies: Princess Theresia of Liechtenstein (1871-1964) (daughter of Prince Alfred of Liechtenstein) and Princess Marie-Berthe de Rohan (daughter of Prince Alain Benjamin Arthur de Rohan).

Having met both ladies, Carlos decided on the latter and asked for her hand in marriage.

On 28 April 1894 Carlos and Berthe were married by Berthe's distant cousin, Cardinal Schönborn in his private chapel in Prague. Berthe had a dominant personality, making the marriage very unpopular among Carlists. "All writers agree that this second marriage was disastrous, not only for the family of Don Carlos and for [Carlos] himself, but also for the [Carlist] party."

Carlos died in Varese in 1909. He is buried in the Cathedral of San Giusto in Trieste. His son Jaime followed in his father's footsteps of claiming the French and Spanish thrones.

== Ancestry ==
Ancestors of Prince Carlos, Duke of Madrid

8. Charles IV of Spain
4. Infante Carlos María Isidro of Spain
9. Princess Maria Luisa of Parma
2. Prince Juan, Count of Montizón
10. John VI of Portugal and Brazil
5. Infanta Maria Francisca of Portugal
11. Infanta Carlota Joaquina of Spain
1. Carlos de Borbón y Austria-Este
12. Ferdinand Karl, Archduke of Austria-Este
6. Francis IV, Duke of Modena
13. Maria Beatrice d'Este, Duchess of Massa
3. Archduchess Maria Beatrix of Austria-Este
14. Victor Emmanuel I of Sardinia
7. Princess Maria Beatrice of Savoy
15. Archduchess Maria Theresa of Austria-Este

== Bibliography ==
- Del Burgo, Jaime. Carlos VII y su tiempo: Leyenda y realidad. Pamplona: Gobierno de Navarra, 1994.
- "The Curé Santa Cruz and the Carlist War." Blackwood's Edinburgh Magazine (1873).
- Francisco López Sanz, Carlos VII: el rey de los caballeros y el caballero de los reyes, Pamplona 1969
- "The Spanish Pretender: Who he is and What he has Been." The New York Times (May 31, 1874).
- Chisholm, Hugh, ed. (1911). "Carlos, Don" . Encyclopædia Britannica. Vol. 5 (11th ed.). Cambridge University Press. pp. 344–345.

Prince Carlos, Duke of Madrid House of Bourbon Cadet branch of the Capetian dynasty Born: 30 March 1848 Died: 18 July 1909
Titles in pretence
Preceded by Prince Juan, Count of Montizón	— TITULAR — King of Spain; Carlist pretender 3 October 1868 – 18 July 1909	Succeeded by Prince Jaime, Duke of Anjou and Madrid
Preceded by Prince Juan, Count of Montizón	— TITULAR — King of France; Legitimist succession 21 November 1887 – 18 July 1909	Succeeded by Prince Jaime, Duke of Anjou and Madrid
Vacant Title last held by Louis Antoine, Duke of Angoulême	— TITULAR — Dauphin of France; Legitimist succession 24 August 1883 – 21 November 1887	Succeeded by Prince Jaime, Duke of Anjou and Madrid
