= Archduchess Maria Beatrix of Austria-Este, Countess of Montizón =

Countess of Montizón

Maria Beatrix of Austria-Este
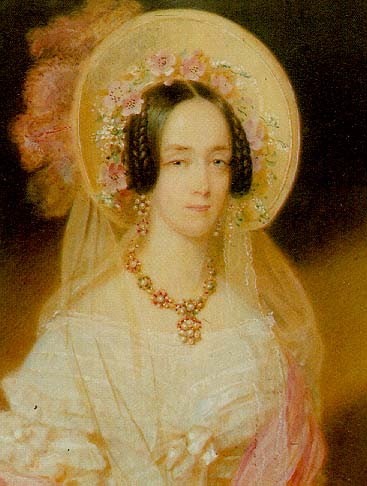
- Portrait of Maria Beatrix, c. 1840

Consort of the Carlist pretender to the Spanish throne
- Pretence: 13 January 1861 – 3 October 1868

Consort of the Legitimist claimant to the French throne
- Pretence: 24 August 1883 – 21 November 1887
- Born: 13 February 1824; Modena, Duchy of Modena and Reggio
- Died: 18 March 1906 (aged 82); Görz, Austria-Hungary
- Spouse: Prince Juan, Count of Montizón (m. 1847; died 1887)
- Issue: Infante Carlos; Infante Alfonso
- House: Austria-Este
- Father: Francis IV, Duke of Modena
- Mother: Maria Beatrice of Savoy

Maria Beatrix Anna Frances of Austria-Este (13 February 1824 – 18 March 1906) (Italian: Maria Beatrice Anna Francesca d'Austria-Este) was a high aristocrat from the Austria-Este branch of the House of Habsburg. As daughter to the ruling Duke of Modena she was born archduchess of Austria-Este and princess of Modena. Following her 1847 marriage, she became Infanta of Spain and Countess of Montizón. As the Duchy of Modena was absorbed into the Kingdom of Italy, after 1859 she lived in exile in Imperial Austria. According to the Carlist reading; in 1861-1868, she was the queen consort of Spain. According to the legitimist reading; in 1883-1887, she was the queen consort of France. Since 1853, she lived separately from her husband and did not claim any of the royal titles, though after 1868, she supported the claim of her oldest son, Carlos. Since 1872, she lived in monasteries, first in Graz and since 1898 in Görz.

== Family and youth ==
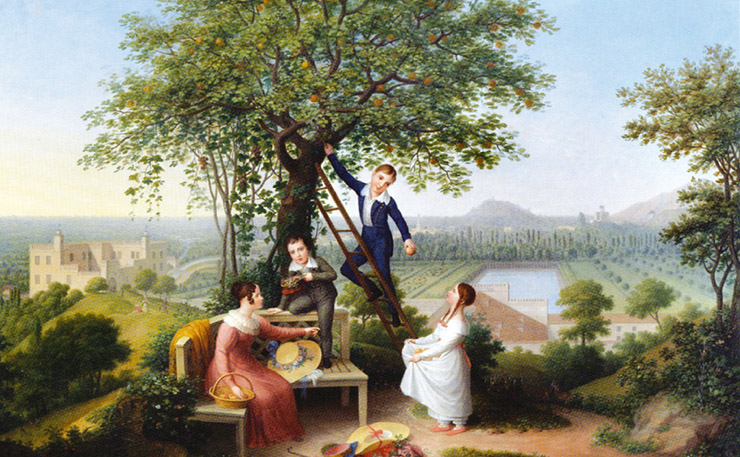
Maria Beatrix (in white) with siblings

Maria Beatrix descended from numerous royal, ducal or otherwise highly aristocratic European branches, including the Habsburgs, the Spanish Bourbons, the House of Savoy and the House of Orléans. Her strictly paternal great-grandfather was Francis I, Holy Roman Emperor. Her father Francis (1779–1846), descendant to the Austria-Este branch of Habsburgs, since 1814 ruled the Duchy of Modena as Francis IV. Her mother, Maria Beatrice (1792–1840), descended from the royal Savoy family, ruling in Turin. The couple married in 1813. Maria Beatrix was the youngest one of 4 siblings, all born between 1817 and 1824. She spent her childhood and youth in luxury of the ducal house, mostly shuttling between the Ducal Palace of Modena and the summer residence in the castle in Catajo. Her mother tongue was Italian.

The only horror moment of her youth came during a revolutionary attempt in 1831; together with her mother and siblings during a night they escaped in a small convoy of carriages to the Austrian-held fortress of Mantua, to return few months later. Unlike was customary in her sphere, she was educated not by personal tutors but mostly by her mother. The family was very religious, patriarchal, strict and decisively hostile to liberalism. Coming of age, she was taking part in various Habsburg family ceremonies, from Milan to Lemberg. Her mother died in 1840; following death of the father, it was her brother who as Francis V assumed the ducal throne in Modena in 1846. As a teenager Maria Beatrix developed some hearing problems; they were possibly related to cold-water showers, recommended by a Viennese doctor. In her youth she practiced painting and wrote juvenile novels. According to some sources Count of Chambord, the young legitimist pretender to the throne of France, proposed to her and was rejected; eventually, he married her older sister.

== Marriage ==
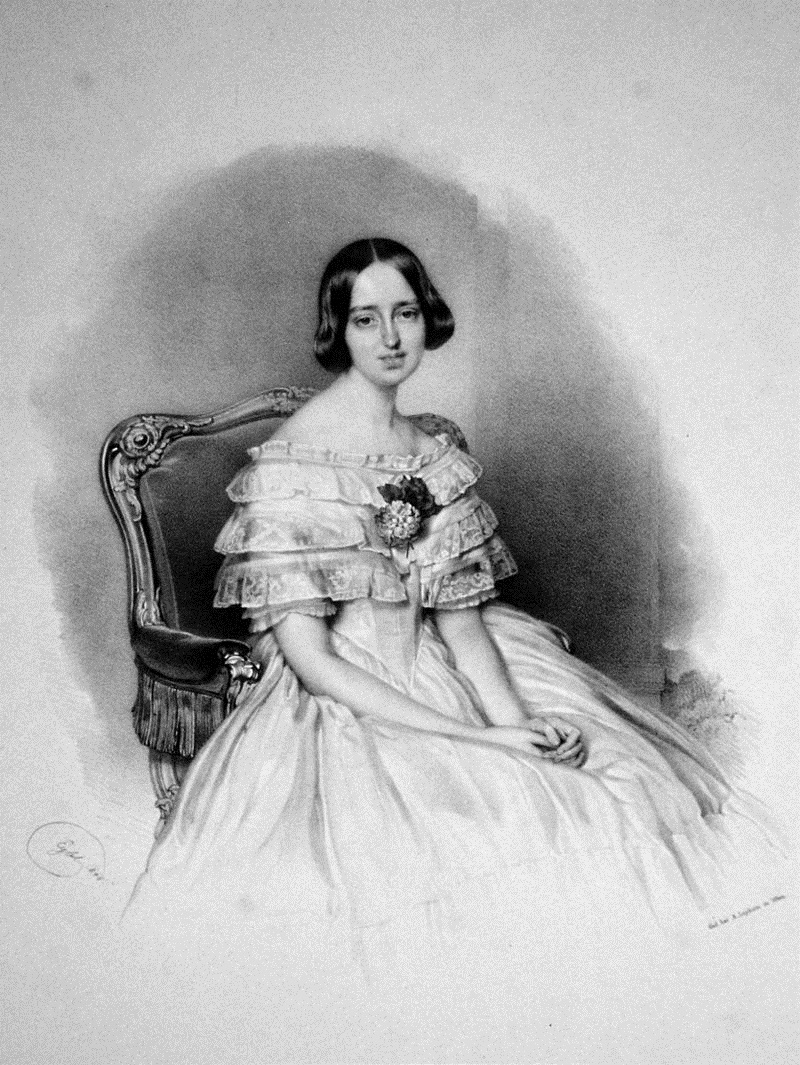
Maria Beatrix aged 22

The marriage of Maria Beatrix was pre-arranged by her father already in 1845; in 1847 she married Juan de Borbón y Braganza (1822–1887), Count of Montizón, grandson of the Spanish King Charles IV and son of the Carlist claimant Infante Carlos María Isidro of Spain. The marriage was conditioned by equally reactionary, anti-liberal, legitimist views held by the two dynasties. The couple settled in Modena but they soon had to flee the revolution of 1848. In 1848 in Laibach, when on their way from Trieste to Vienna, Maria Beatrix gave birth to their first son Carlos. Once re-established, and because Vienna was also undergoing a tumultuous revolutionary period, they decided to join Juan's brother in London; by train and carriages the couple made it across Europe. In the English capital their second son Alfonso was born in 1849. The family returned to Modena in 1851, once Francis V had quashed the rebellion and re-assumed power.

Unlike his father, Juan de Borbón started to develop increasingly liberal views; this produced conflict between the spouses, as he objected to his sons having been educated "to become Jesuits". Juan clashed also with his brother-in-law, Francis V. The confrontation climaxed in an open showdown; the duke ordered Juan out of his possessions. It has been eventually agreed that the couple would separate; Francis V agreed to pay Juan a lifetime pension. In 1852 the latter settled in London, where he later entered into an intimate relationship with an English commoner and had 2 children. However, Maria Beatrix and Juan remained married until the death of Juan in 1887. The two maintained some scarce and rather formal correspondence at least until the early 1870s.

== Mother ==
Maria Beatrix with her sons Carlos and Alfonso Carlos around 1850.

In the 1850s Maria Beatrix lived in Modena. Her daily routine was divided mostly between religious duties and raising her sons, for whom she has carefully selected various teachers and preceptors. Their education was extremely religious and reactionary; Maria Beatrix was assisted in this task by her stepmother-in-law, María Teresa de Braganza. As Carlos and maybe Alfonso were supposed to inherit the Carlist claim, they were raised also in Spanish culture, surrounded by Spanish ecclesiastics and pedagogues. Maria Beatrix continued to suffer from poor health and used to spend long spells under treatment. In 1857 Pope Pius IX visited Modena; both Carlos and Alfonso received confirmation. Following invasion by the Kingdom of Sardinia in 1859 the family had to flee again, this time to the Austrian Empire; they would never return to Modena.

The ex-emperor Ferdinand I offered them hospitality at Prague Castle, which remained their key residence until 1864; she did not travel, except to peripheral locations at the outskirts of the city. Technically in 1860-1868 she was the Carlist queen of Spain. Having turned 40 Maria Beatrix kept suffering from increasing health problems; to address them, in 1864 she and her children moved to Austrian controlled Venice, where she owned the Loredan palace. However, outbreak of the Italo-Austrian war forced them to flee again in 1866. During the next few years she shuttled between Innsbruck, Vienna and Graz, hosted in residences of her Habsburg and Austria-Este relatives. Her older son Carlos married in 1867 with Margherita, princess from the exiled House of Bourbon-Parma. Her younger son Alfonso married in 1871 Infanta Maria das Neves of Portugal, from the exiled House of Braganza.

== Among Carmelites in Graz ==
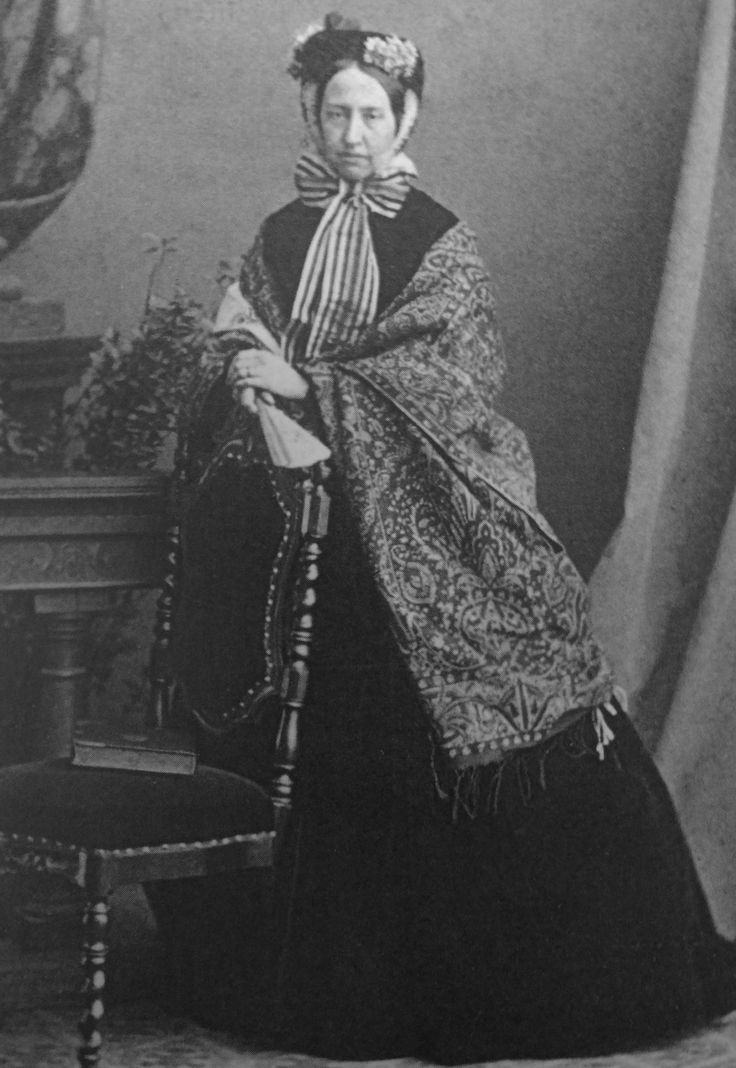
Maria Beatrix in Graz

With both her sons now married and commencing their own family life, Maria Beatrix concluded that her duties as mother came to the end. She decided to spend the rest of her life dedicated to prayer. As she was still legally married, she obtained written approval from her separated husband; Pope Pius IX issued a specific authorization in a personal, very cordial letter. She also consulted her siblings and other relatives. In early 1872 Maria Beatrix moved into the Discalced Carmelite monastery in Graz. Some authors claim she entered the order and assumed the name of Maria Ignatia of the Sacred Heart; however, her biographer who corresponded with her claims she did not take vows but merely agreed to comply with rules of the Carmelite order, effectively leading the life of a nun.

As the order was an enclosed one, she maintained very scarce contact with the outer world; it was limited mostly to correspondence. It is known that the Emperor Franz Joseph I visited her a few times and demonstrated great affection. She was also at times visited by her sons, especially Alfonso, who owned real estate in Graz and used to spend some time in the city. In general her poor health improved, though in her 40s she became almost completely deaf. In 1882 she donated her property, the Loredán and Pourtales palaces in Venice, to her sons. In 1883-1887 technically she was the legitimist queen of France. In 1893, following the death of her daughter-in-law, Maria Beatrix hinted that she was prepared to leave the Carmelites to take care of her grandchildren. However, she also suggested that Carlos remarry, and recommended Berthe de Rohan. Carlos indeed remarried in 1894.

== Among Sisters of the Cross in Gorizia ==
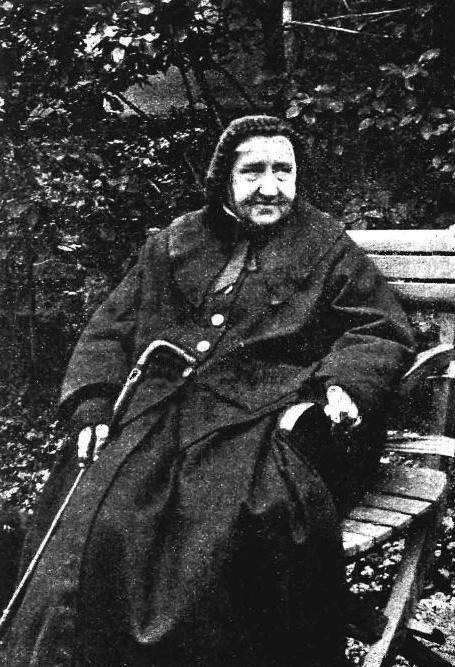
Maria Beatrix in Gorizia

In the 1890s the German nationalism was on the rise in Austria; it turned also against individuals perceived aliens. There were some demonstrations arranged against Alfonso and Maria Beatrix in Graz. Afterwards, both sons Carlos and Alfonso suggested that she move elsewhere; having obtained her permission, accordingly they arranged for her the transfer to the monastery of Sisters of the Cross in Gorizia in 1898. It is not clear why Gorizia had been chosen; one author suggests it was because many legitimist personalities, including Charles X, Count of Chambord and his wife, Maria Beatrix' sister Maria Theresa, were buried in the Monastero di Castagnevizza. Though she was not admitted as a nun, she lived within the monastery premises and complied with the Sisters of the Cross rules.

It was in Gorizia that in 1904 she celebrated very modestly her 80th birthday, visited by both sons and their wives; she received also hundreds of letters and telegram messages from the Carlists, French legitimists, distant family members and the Pope. Also in Gorizia Maria Beatrix maintained epistolographic exchange with various correspondents, in particular with Manuel Polo y Peyrolón, who already at that time was preparing her biography. On March 10, 1906, Maria Beatriz suddenly fell ill. Though the doctor did not detect serious problems, she confessed and was given last rites. Her state deteriorated fast and on March 17 she went into a coma, to pass away the following morning. According to her last will, she was buried in the internal cemetery of the Discalced Carmelites in Graz. Her death was acknowledged by European press, especially Catholic and legitimist titles.

== Works ==
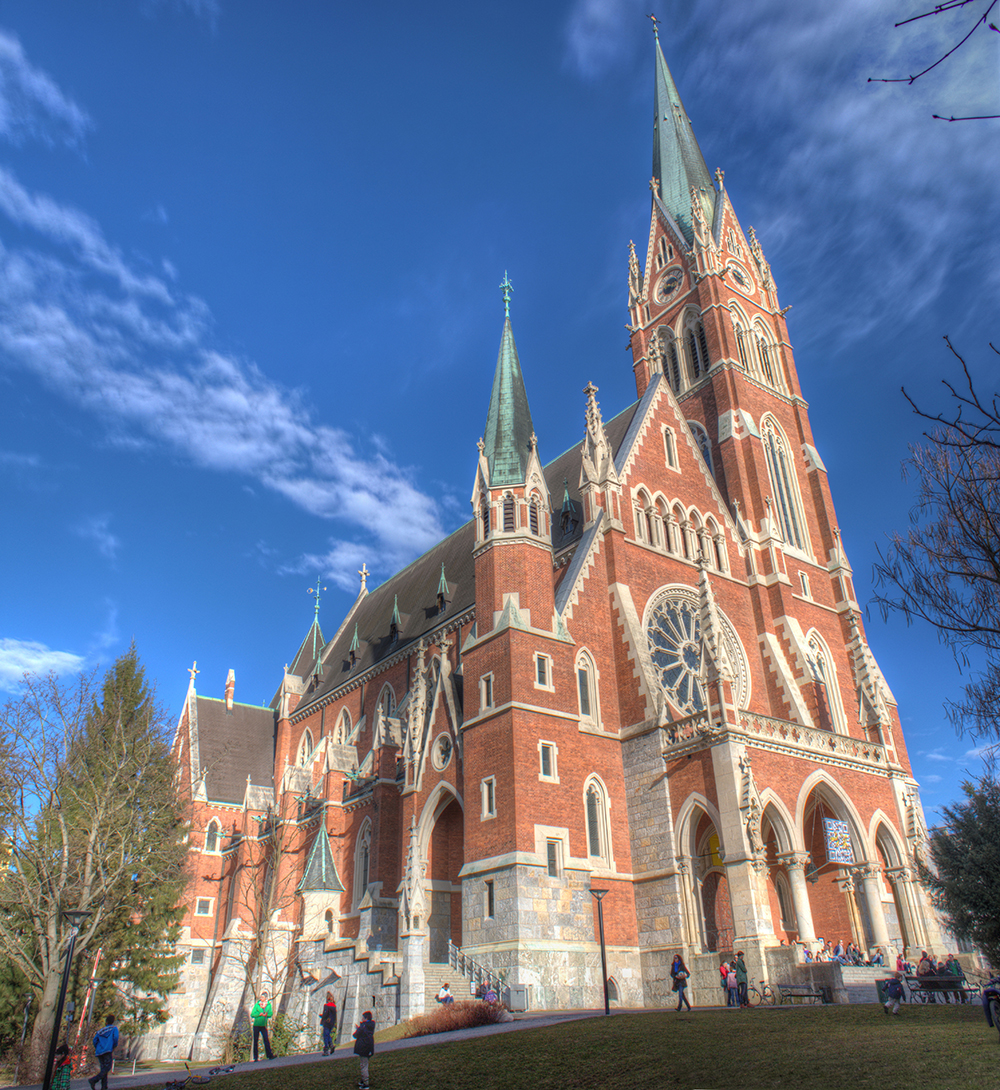
Herz Jesu Kirche, Graz

When in the Graz and Gorizia monasteries, as an educated person Maria Beatrix tried her hand in letters; her biographer arrived at the total of 87 of her works, written in French, German, Italian and Spanish. They included religious reflections, meditations, moral treaties, manuals, prayers, spiritual exercises, doctrinal studies, biographies of the saints, other historiographic pieces, anti-masonic essays, and other. She also completed a biography of her relative, Maria Cristina of Savoy, later beatified by the Church. Some of them she did not re-read; in case of some she kept editing them throughout decades. It is not clear whether during her lifetime they were shared with Carmelites and Sisters of the Cross or whether Maria Beatrix kept the works to herself. After 1906 her confessor published the writings, which amounted to 97 volumes, in Tipografia Emiliana di Venezia. Some of them have been translated into Spanish.

As descendant to the Austria-Estes Maria Beatrix enjoyed considerable wealth, which she partially retained also having closed herself in the monastery. She spent much of it for religious purposes, not least co-financing both convents where she resided. She donated very substantial sums to Catholic missions around the world, including Japan, China, West Indies, Africa and Albania. Single-handedly she founded the Institute of the Good Shepherd in Graz, an institution for the youth, and the Carmelite convent in Modena. She also substantially contributed to construction of the Church of the Sacred Heart in Graz and the Church of the Sacred Heart in Gorizia, apart from countless other minor donations, including contributing to various papal initiatives.

== Queen ==
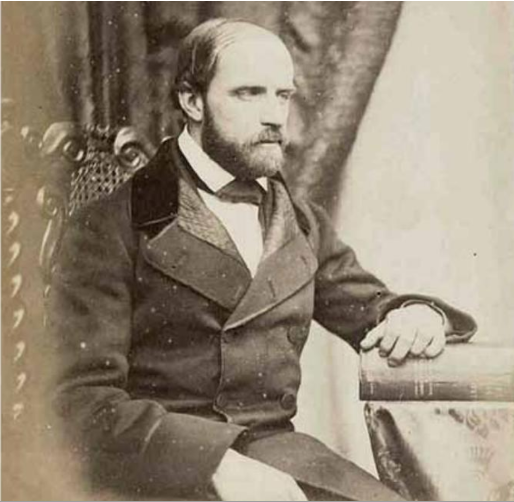
Infante Juan, around 1870

When in 1847 Maria Beatrix married Juan de Borbón, he was the first in succession to the Carlist claim to the throne of Spain. Following the death of his older brother in 1861 the claim passed on to Juan, who became recognized by the Carlists as King Juan III. At the time Maria Beatrix has been for 8 years separated from her husband. Nevertheless, according to Carlist succession rules she was still the queen consort. None of the sources consulted indicates whether she supported the claim of her separated husband or whether she claimed the title herself, as at this point her personal modesty clashed with her zealous legitimism. However, she reportedly identified with Spain and raised her sons as future Carlist claimants. Juan renounced his Carlist claim in 1868 in favor of their son, who posed as the Spanish king Carlos VII. Maria Beatrix supported the claim of her son.

The last direct male descendant of the French Bourbons Count of Chambord died in 1883; since he had married her sister, he was Maria Beatrix’ brother-in-law. According to the dynastic doctrine of the French legitimists, known as Blancs d'Espagne, the French crown passed to Juan, who was recognized as king Jean III; his legally married wife of royal descent was the queen consort. At that time Maria Beatrix has been for 11 years closed in the Graz monastery; it is not known whether she had in any way claimed the title. Except family links to the Chambords, she had no ties to France. Maria Beatrix remained the legitimist queen consort of France until the death of her husband in 1887; at this point the claim passed to her oldest son Carlos, who claimed the French crown as King Charles XI.

== Ancestry ==
Ancestors of Archduchess Maria Beatrix of Austria-Este, Countess of Montizón

8. Francis I, Holy Roman Emperor
4. Ferdinand Karl, Archduke of Austria-Este
9. Maria Theresa of Austria
2. Francis IV, Duke of Modena
10. Ercole III d'Este, Duke of Modena
5. Maria Beatrice d'Este, Duchess of Massa
11. Maria Teresa Cybo-Malaspina, Duchess of Massa
1. Maria Beatrix of Austria-Este
12. Victor Amadeus III of Sardinia
6. Victor Emmanuel I of Sardinia
13. Maria Antonia Ferdinanda of Spain
3. Maria Beatrice of Savoy
14. Ferdinand Karl, Archduke of Austria-Este (= 4)
7. Maria Theresa of Austria-Este
15. Maria Beatrice d'Este, Duchess of Massa (= 5)

== Descendants ==
Maria Beatrix married Juan de Borbón. They had 2 children, 5 grandchildren, 27 great-grandchildren, 56 great-great-grandchildren (in bold descendants born during the lifetime of Maria Beatrix) and 85 great-great-great-grandchildren.

1. Prince Carlos (1848–1909). He married Princess Margherita of Bourbon-Parma and then Princess Berthe de Rohan. In the first marriage he had 5 children:

- 1.1. **Princess Blanca of Bourbon** (1868–1949). She married Archduke Leopold Salvator of Austria, Prince of Tuscany. The couple had 10 children:
  - 1.1.1. **Dolores Habsburg-Lothringen** (1891 – 1974). She did not marry and had no issue
  - 1.1.2. **Immaculata Habsburg-Lothringen** (1892 – 1971). She married Nobile Igino and had no issue
  - 1.1.3. **Margarethe Habsburg-Lothringen** (1894 – 1986). She married Francesco Maria Taliani de Marchio and had no issue
  - 1.1.4. **Rainer Habsburg-Lothringen** (1895 – 1930). He did not marry and had no issue
  - 1.1.5. **Leopold Habsburg-Lothringen** (1897 – 1958). He first married Dagmar von Nicolics-Podrinski and then Alicia Gibson Coburn. In the first marriage he had issue (1)
  - 1.1.6. **Maria Antonia Habsburg-Lothringen** (1899 – 1977). She first married Ramón de Orlandis y Villalonga and then Luis Perez Sucre. In the first marriage she had issue (5)
  - 1.1.7. **Anton Habsburg-Lothringen** (1901 – 1987). He married Princess Ileana of Romania and had issue (6)
  - 1.1.8. **Assunta Habsburg-Lothringen** (1902 – 1993). She married Joseph Hopfinger and had issue (2)
  - 1.1.9. **Franz Josef Habsburg-Lothringen** (1905 – 1975). He first married Maria Baumer and then Maria Elena Seunig. In the second marriage he had issue (1)
  - 1.1.10. Karl Pius Habsburg-Lothringen (1909 – 1953). He married Christa Satzger de Bálványos and had issue (2)
- 1.2. **Prince Jaime** (1870–1931). He did not marry and most likely had no issue
- 1.3. **Princess Elvira of Bourbon** (1871–1929). She did not marry. With an Italian artist Filippo Folchi she had 3 children:
  - 1.3.1. **Jorge de Borbón** (1900–1941). He married Germaine Pilard and had issue (1)
  - 1.3.2. **León Fulco de Borbón** (1904–1962). He married Ana Gregoria del Carmen Vázquez y Carrizosa and had issue (6)
  - 1.3.3. **Filiberto de Borbón** (1904–1968). He married Lúcia Vázquez y Carrizosa and had issue (8)
- 1.4. **Princess Beatrice of Bourbon** (1874–1961). She married prince Fabrizio Massimo di Roviano. The couple had 4 children:
  - 1.4.1. **Margarita Massimo** (1898 - 1922). She married count Emilio Pagliano and had no issue
  - 1.4.2. **Fabiola Massimo** (1900 - 1983). She married barón Enzo Galli Zugaro and had issue (4)
  - 1.4.3. **María de las Nieves Massimo** (1902 - 1984). She married Charles Piercy and had no issue
  - 1.4.4. **Blanca Massimo** (1906 - 1999). She married count Pablo von Wurmbrand-Stuppach and had issue (1)
- 1.5. **Princess Alice of Bourbon** (1876–1975). She married Friedrich, Prince von Schönburg-Waldenburg. The couple had one child before the marriage was annulled; Alicia then married Lino del Prete. In both relations she had 10 children:
  - 1.5.1. **Karl Leopold von Schönburg-Waldenburg** (1902–1992). He married Ornella Ravaschieri Fieschi and then Varaiterai a Neti. In the first marriage he had issue (5)
  - 1.5.2. **Margarita del Prete** (1904–1938). She married Michele Signorini and had no issue
  - 1.5.3. **Giorgio del Prete** (1905–1928). He did not marry and had no issue
  - 1.5.4. Cristina del Prete (1907–1982). She married Alberto Picchiani and had issue (2)
  - 1.5.5. Maria Beatrice del Prete (1908–1944). She married Raffaelle Casertano and had issue (5)
  - 1.5.6. Maria Luisa del Prete (1909-?). She did not marry and had no issue
  - 1.5.7. Maria Francesca del Prete (1911–1941). She married Domenico Ravera and has issue (2)
  - 1.5.8. Ernestina del Prete (1916-?). She did not marry and had no issue
  - 1.5.9. Francesco del Prete (1918–1995). He married Maria Palestrino and had issue (2)
  - 1.5.10.Maria Valentina del Prete (1922-?). She married Carlo Arezzo della Targia and had issue (3)

2. Prince Alfonso (1849–1936). He married Infanta Maria das Neves de Braganza. The couple had either no issue or one child either born as a stillborn or who died in few days

Some descendants (listed if picture available):

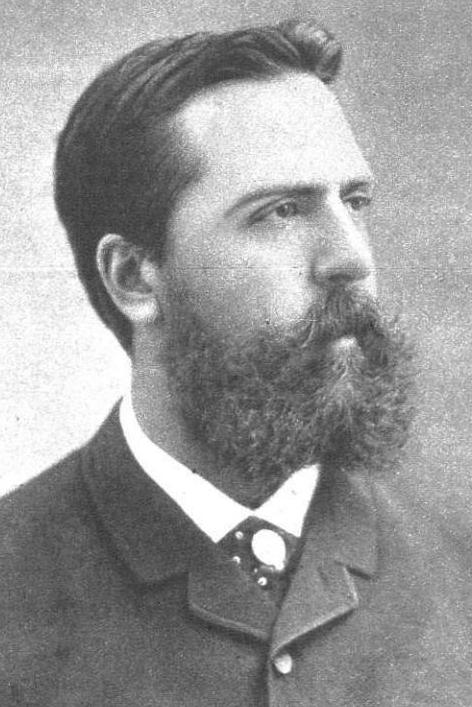
Carlos
(son)

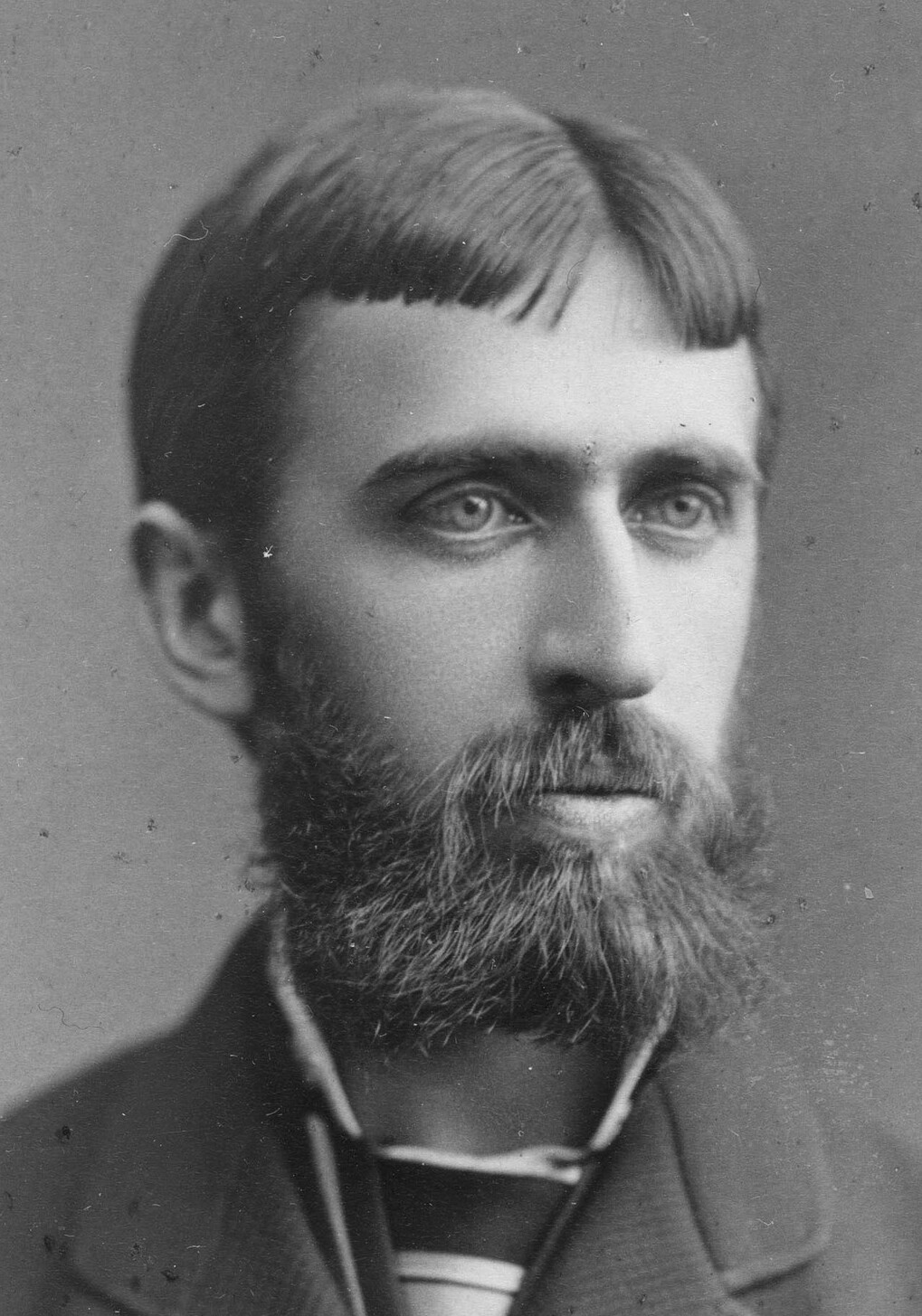
Alfonso
(son)

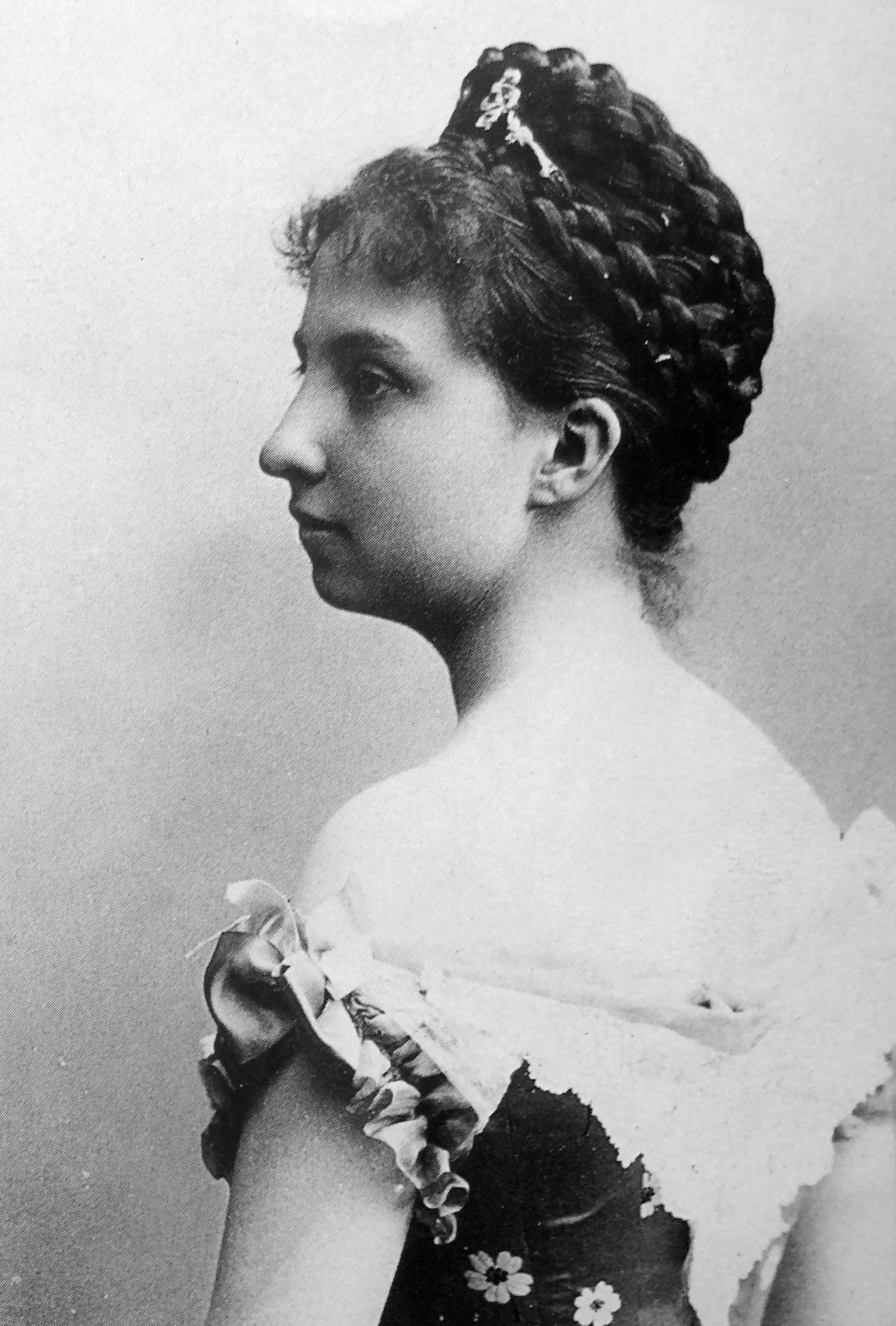
Blanca
(gd-dtr)

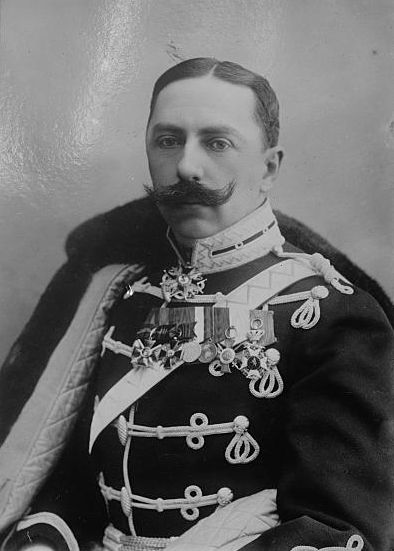
Jaime
(gd-son)

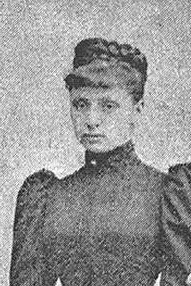
Elvira
(gd-dtr)

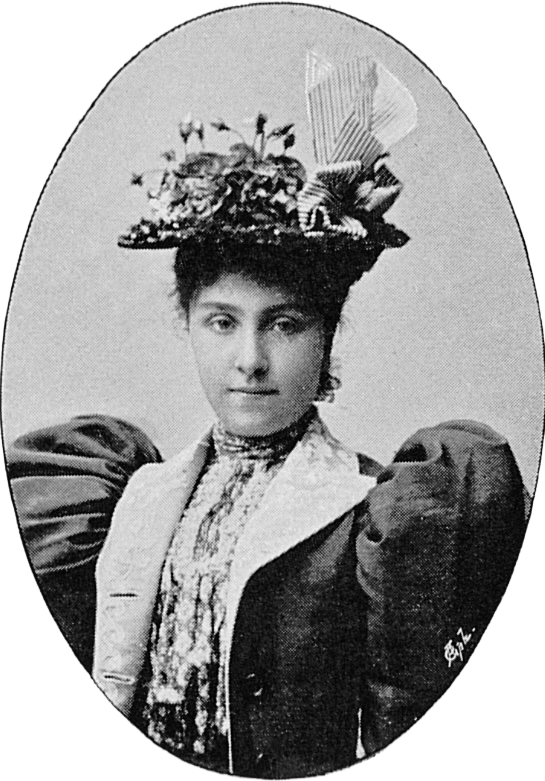
Beatrice (grd dtr)

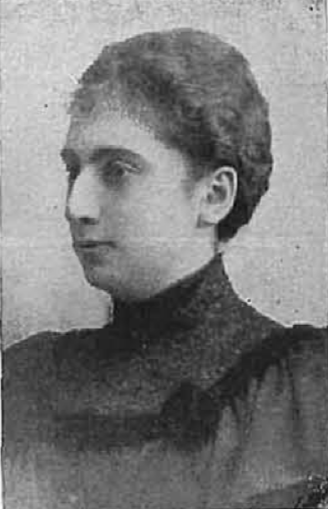
Alice
(gd-dtr)

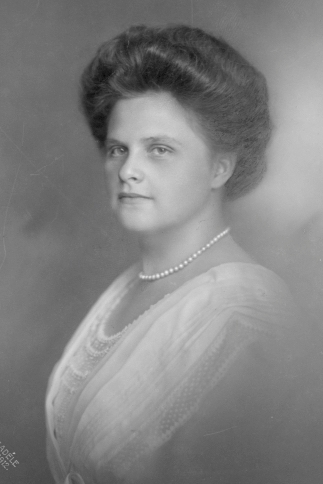
Dolores
(g-gd-dtr)

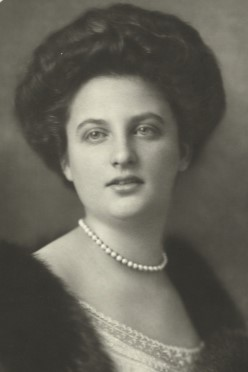
Immaculata
(g-gd-dtr)

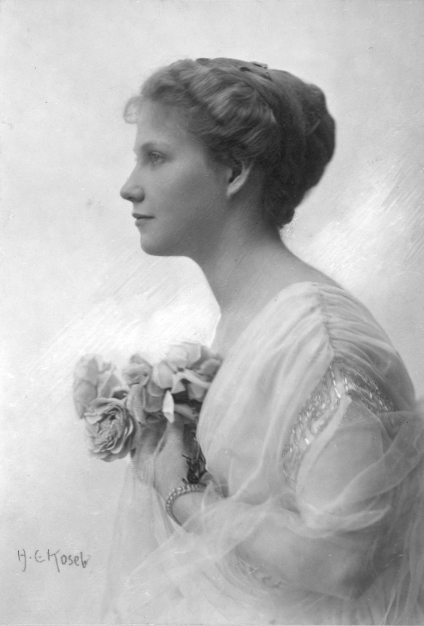
Margarita
(g-gd-dtr)

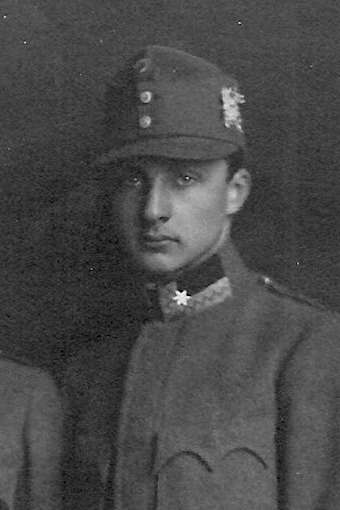
Rainer
(g-gd-son)

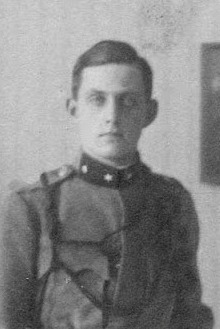
Leopold
(g-gd-son)

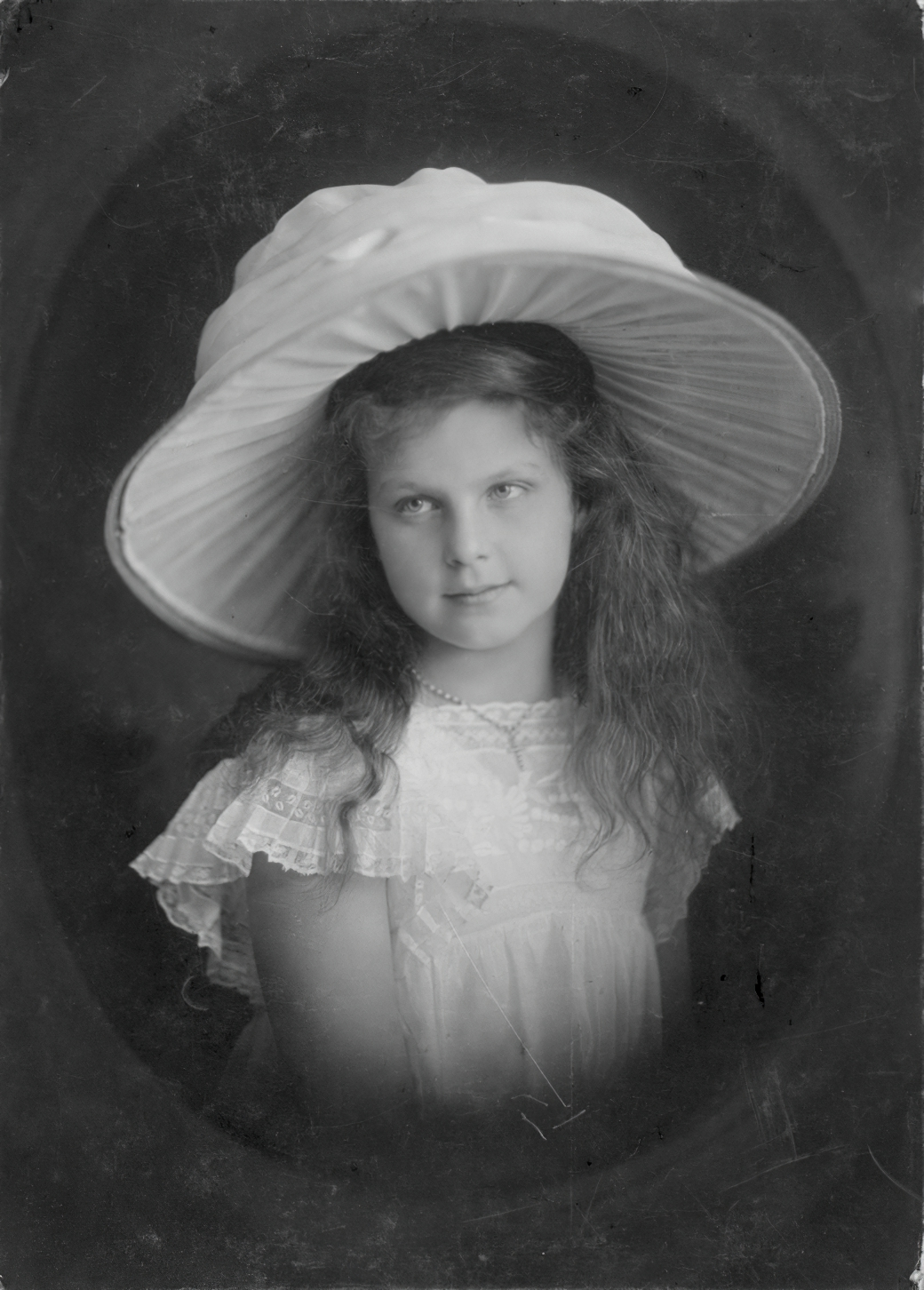
Maria Antonia
(g-gd-dtr)

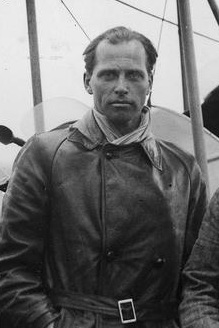
Anton
(g-gd-son)

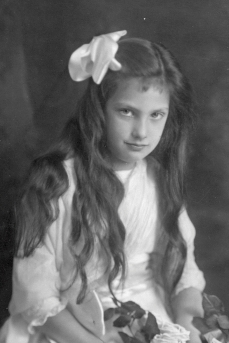
Assunta
(g-gd-dtr)

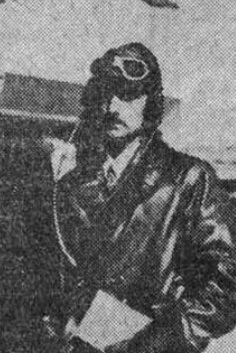
Franz
(g-gd-son)

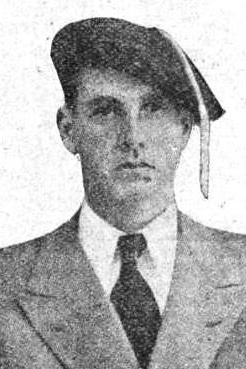
Karl
(g-gd-son)

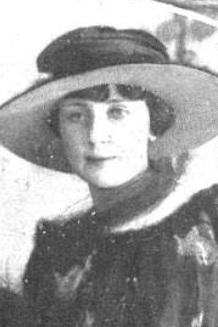
Margarita
(g-gd-dtr)

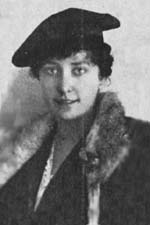
Fabiola
(g-gd-dtr)

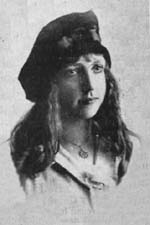
Maria
(g-gd-dtr)

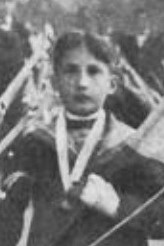
Giorgio
(g-gd-son)

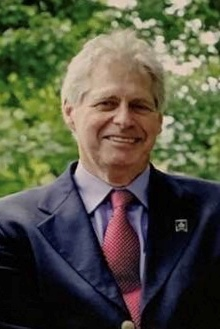
Dominic
(g-g-gd-son)

== Footnotes ==
Archduchess Maria Beatrix of Austria-Este, Countess of Montizón House of Austria-Este Cadet branch of the House of Habsburg-Lorraine Born: 13 February 1824 Died: 18 March 1906
Titles in pretence
Preceded by Princess Maria Carolina of Bourbon-Two Sicilies	— TITULAR — Queen consort of Spain; Carlist; 13 January 1861 – 3 October 1868	Succeeded by Princess Margherita of Bourbon-Parma
Preceded by Maria Theresa of Austria-Este	— TITULAR — Queen consort of France; Legitimist; 24 August 1883 – 21 November 1887; Reason for succession failure: July Revolution	Succeeded by Princess Margherita of Bourbon-Parma
