= Princess Margherita of Bourbon-Parma =

Margherita
- Duchess of Madrid and Anjou
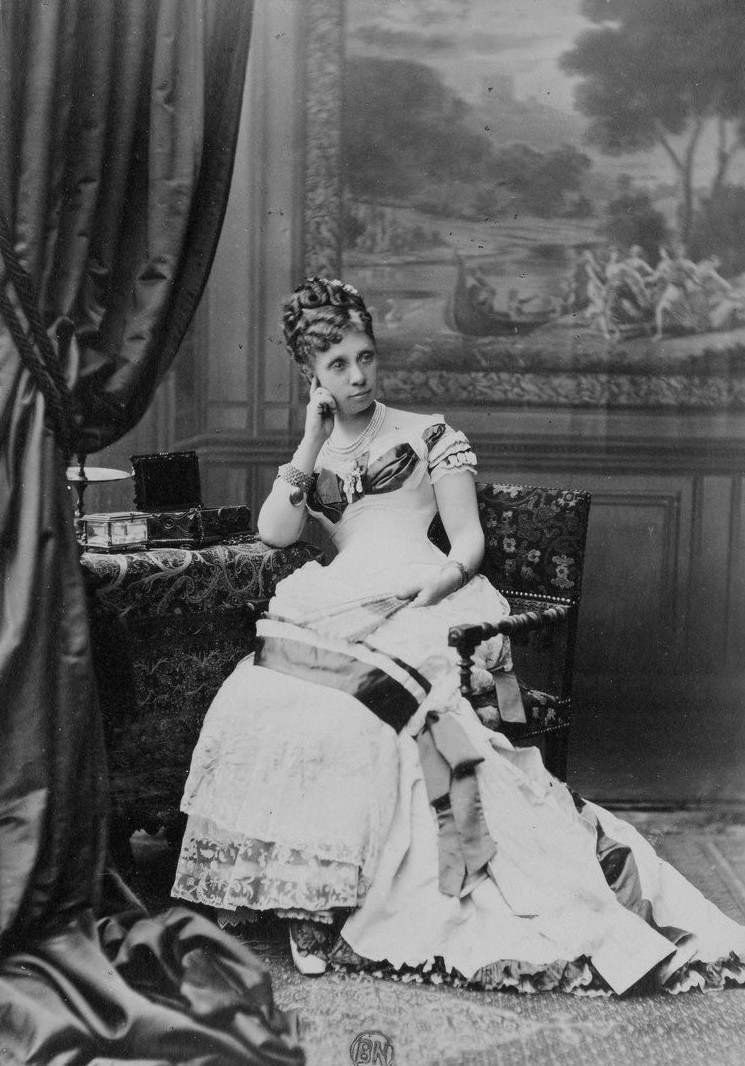
- Photograph by Nadar, 1878

Consort of the Carlist pretender to the Spanish throne
- Pretence: 3 October 1868 - 29 January 1893

Consort of the Legitimist claimant to the French throne
- Pretence: 21 November 1887 - 29 January 1893
- Born: 1 January 1847; Lucca, Duchy of Parma
- Died: 29 January 1893 (aged 46); Viareggio, Tuscany, Kingdom of Italy
- Burial: Tenuta Reale (Viareggio), Viareggio, Kingdom of Italy
- Spouse: Prince Carlos, Duke of Madrid (m. 1867)
- Issue: Princess Blanca, Archduchess Leopold Salvator of Austria; Prince Jaime, Duke of Anjou and Madrid; Princess Elvira of Bourbon; Princess Beatrice, Princess of Roviano; Princess Alice, Princess Friedrich of Schönburg-Waldenburg
Names
- French: Marguerite Marie Thérèse Henriette; Italian: Margherita Maria Teresa Enrichetta; Spanish: Margarita Maria Teresa Enriqueta
- House: Bourbon-Parma
- Father: Charles III, Duke of Parma
- Mother: Princess Louise Marie Thérèse of France
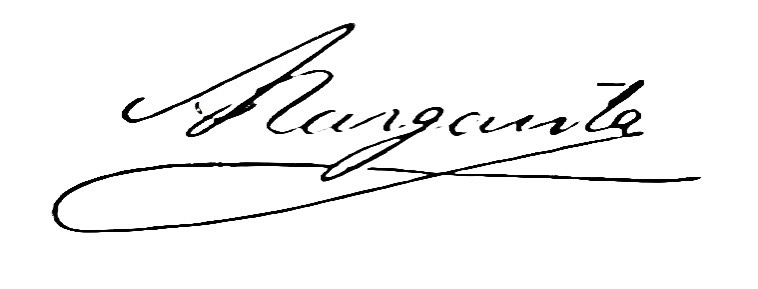
- Signature

- Coat of arms Princess Marguerite of Bourbon Parma

Princess Margherita of Bourbon-Parma (Italian: Margherita Maria Teresa Enrichetta, Principessa di Parma; 1 January 1847 – 29 January 1893) was the eldest child and daughter of Charles III, Duke of Parma and Princess Louise Marie Thérèse of France, the eldest daughter of Charles Ferdinand, Duke of Berry and Princess Caroline Ferdinande Louise of the Two Sicilies.

Margherita was thus a great-granddaughter of Charles X of France. She was born in Lucca, Duchy of Parma. She was a niece of Henri, comte de Chambord, disputedly King of France and Navarre from 2 to 9 August 1830 and afterwards the Legitimist Pretender to the throne of France from 1844 to 1883. Through her marriage to Prince Carlos of Bourbon, Carlist claimant to the Spanish throne and Legitimist claimant to the French throne, Margherita was considered as the rightfull Queen of Spain from 1868 to 1893 and Queen of France from 1887 to 1893.

== Early life ==
Margherita was born on 1 January 1847, in Lucca, Duchy of Parma. She was the eldest child and daughter of Charles III, Duke of Parma and Princess Louise Marie Thérèse of France, who was the eldest daughter of Charles Ferdinand, Duke of Berry and Princess Maria Carolina of Naples and Sicily. Margherita was thus a great-granddaughter of Charles X of France, the last of the French rulers from the senior branch of the House of Bourbon, as the younger brother of King Louis XVI. She was a niece of Henri, comte de Chambord, disputed King of France and Navarre, and the Legitimist claimaint to the throne of France.

When she was one year old, the Revolutions of 1848 forced Margherita and her parents to leave Parma in March 1848, with her brother Robert being born in exile in Florence four months later. The family first stayed in Naples and Livorno, before finding refuge at Queen Victoria's court in England and Scotland. Her parents became close acquaintainces of Queen Victoria and her husband, Prince Albert. Margherita, called “Meg”, by the Queen, was described as a “ugly princess” by Sarah Lyttelton. Margherita's father was restored to power in March 1849, and the family shortly thereafter returned to Parma.

On 26 March 1854, Margherita's father, Charles III, Duke of Parma, was assassinated. She grew up in Parma until the Risorgimento, whereafter her brother was deposed and the family moved to Venice. Her mother died there in February 1864, at their home, Palazzo Giustinian. The four children (Margherita, Robert, Alice, and Henry) moved to Schloss Frohsdorf in the Austrian Empire. Margherita remained close to her french governess, Madame de Richebois.

== Marriage ==
When she was around 17 years old, Margherita fell in love with her second cousin, Prince Carlos of Bourbon, eldest son of Prince Juan of Bourbon and Archduchess Maria Beatrix of Austria-Este. Their romance was not approved by Margherita's uncle who believed she deserved a better match. Margherita was engaged to Prince Carlos of Bourbon on her 20th birthday, 1 January 1867, following the provision of her uncle Henry's consent.

On 4 February 1867, Margherita and Carlos were married privately in the Chapel of Schloss Frohsdorf, Austrian Empire. She received a dowry of 32,000F from her uncle. Emperor Franz Joseph and King George of Hanover were the guests of honour. The couple had five children, four daughters and one son:

- Blanca (7 September 1868 – 25 October 1949); married Archduke Leopold Salvator of Austria, and had ten children.
- Jaime (27 June 1870 – 2 October 1931); Carlist claimant to the throne of Spain as Jaime III, and Legitimist claim to the throne of France as Jacques I; never married, no issue.
- Elvira (28 July 1871 – 9 December 1929); never married, had illegitimate issue.
- Beatrice (21 March 1874 – 1 November 1961); married Fabrizio Massimo, and had four children.
- Alice (29 June 1876 – 20 January 1975); married firstly, Prince Friedrich of Schönburg-Waldenburg, and had one child, divorced in 1903. Married secondly, Lino del Prete, and had ten children.

== Carlist War and later life ==
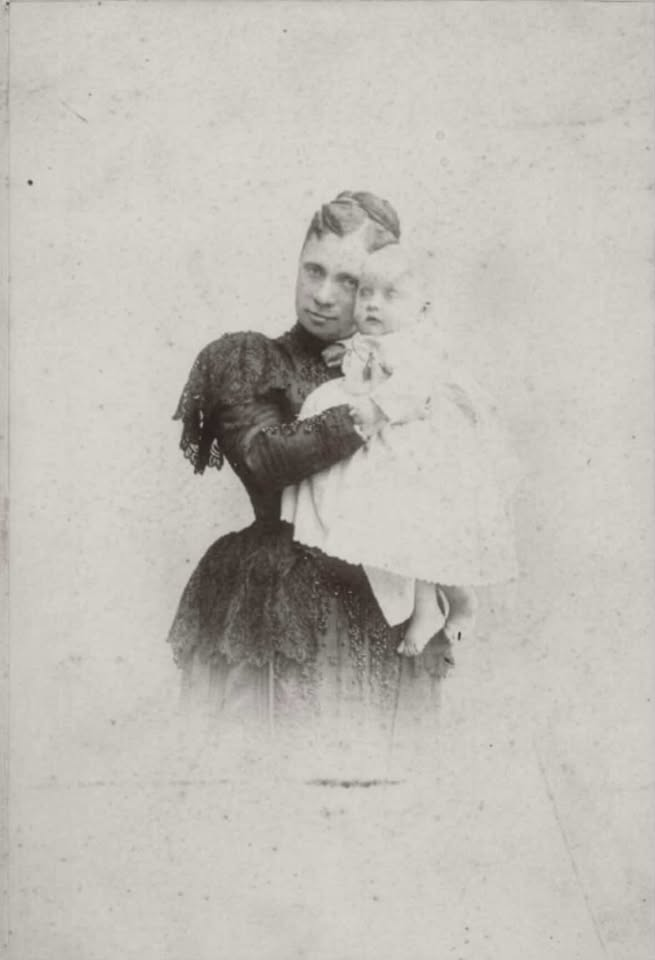
Margherita with her eldest granddaughter Archduchess Dolores, 1891

Carlos embarked on the third Carlist War between 1872 and 1876, in an attempt to unsuccessfully, to gain the throne of Spain by force. To be near the Spanish border, Margherita moved with her children to Pau. In 1875, Carlos, for a short time, established a court in Elizondo, Navarre. But the war ended badly and the family moved to Passy, France. In 1881, they were expelled from France due to Carlos's political activities. Margherita separated from her husband, and found refuge in her inherited estate, Tenuata Reale, at Viareggio, Italy. The children split their time between their separated parents, with Carlos living in a palace in Venice.

Margherita lived simply after the separation. In 1883, she attended her uncle's funeral at Schloss Frohsdorf. As her siblings, she was shocked by the Count of Paris' behaviour, especially when he presented his condolences as being from the "House of France". In fact, the Count of Chambord's family, especially his widow, refused to recognized the Count of Paris as the rightful heir to the French throne. They decided to recognize Margherita's father-in-law, Prince Juan of Bourbon, as the rightful King of France because he was, by the death of his cousin and brother-in-law, the new head of the House of Bourbon. According to her nephew, Archduke Leopold Ferdinand, she was known as Aunt Meg to her numerous nieces and nephews. Like many members of her family (her son Jaime, her brother-in-law Alfonso Carlos, her daughter Alice, etc.) Margherita lives to travel, by boat, or by rails. During her many trips, she took several names, such as Countess Zileri, Countess of Sala, Madame de Candolle, from being incognito. As she absolutely wanted to remained incognito, she play roles, as Madame de Candolle was from Marseille, had a naval officer who just left for China, and express Republican views.

On 12 May 1884, Margherita met Queen Victoria, at Windsor. Later, the Queen wrote, in her diary :

After luncheon, we saw the Dss of Madrid, wife of Don Carlos & eldest daughter of the late Duke of Parma, & of "Mademoiselle", sister of the Cte de Chambord. Her son is being educated at the Jesuit College at Bowmont Lodge near Old Windsor, & she had come to see him. She is small, & not good looking, reminding me of her father & mother. She spoke with gratitude of my kindness to her in former times, when she came with them to Windsor...

Margherita died on 29 January 1893, at the age of 46. A few months later, Queen Victoria wrote to Margherita's niece, Princess Marie-Louise of Bulgaria, a letter in which she briefly mentions Margherita's death:

My dear future niece, - Your very kind letter written in such beautiful English has given me the greatest pleasure, and I thank you very much for it, as well as for your photographs. I knew your grandparents well, and your father was with them here as a baby, as well as your poor aunt, whose death I was grieved to hear of...

== Ancestry ==
Ancestors of Princess Margherita of Bourbon-Parma

8. Louis I of Etruria
4. Charles II, Duke of Parma
9. Maria Luisa, Duchess of Lucca
2. Charles III, Duke of Parma
10. Victor Emmanuel I of Sardinia
5. Maria Theresa of Savoy
11. Maria Theresa of Austria-Este
1. Margherita of Bourbon-Parma
12. Charles X of France
6. Charles Ferdinand, Duke of Berry
13. Maria Theresa of Savoy
3. Louise of Artois
14. Francis I of the Two Sicilies
7. Maria Carolina of Naples and Sicily
15. Maria Clementina of Austria

Princess Margherita of Bourbon-Parma House of Bourbon-Parma Cadet branch of the House of Bourbon Born: 1 January 1847 Died: 29 January 1893
Titles in pretence
Preceded by Maria Beatrix of Austria-Este	— TITULAR — Queen consort of Spain; Carlist; 3 October 1868 – 29 January 1893	Vacant Title next held by Berthe de Rohan
Preceded by Maria Beatrix of Austria-Este	— TITULAR — Queen consort of France; Legitimist; 18 November 1887 – 29 January 1893	Vacant Title next held by Berthe de Rohan
