= Infanta Maria das Neves of Portugal =

Portuguese Infanta (1852–1941)

Infanta Maria das Neves
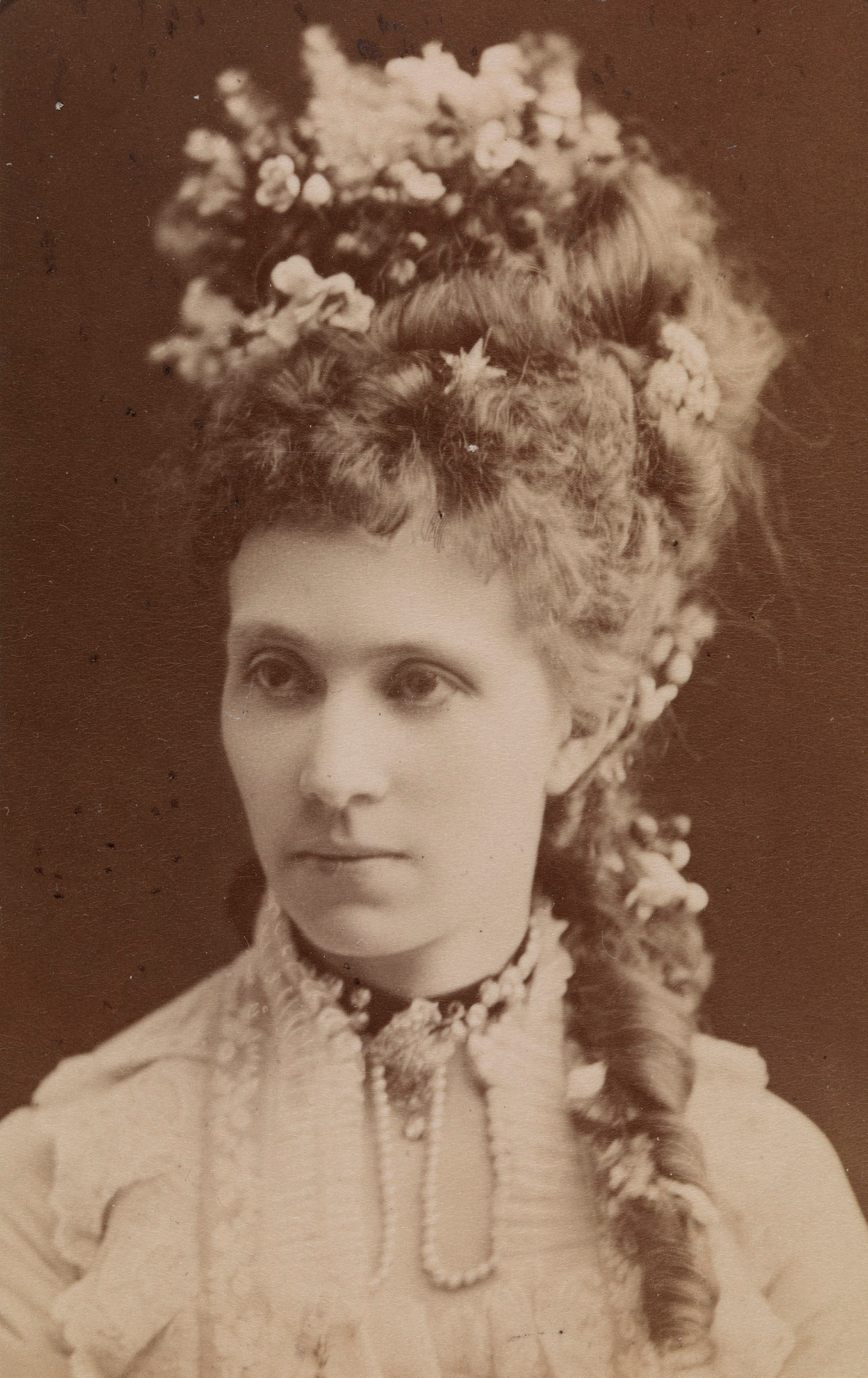
- Photographed in c. 1877

Consort of the Carlist pretender to the Spanish throne and the Legitimist claimant to the French throne
- Pretence: 2 October 1931 – 29 September 1936
- Born: 5 August 1852; Kleinheubach
- Died: 15 February 1941 (aged 88); Vienna, Nazi Austria
- Burial: Puchheim Castle
- Spouse: Alfonso Carlos, Duke of San Jaime (m. 1871; died 1936)
Names
- Portuguese: Maria das Neves Isabel Eulália Carlota Adelaide Micaela Gabriela Rafaela Gonzaga de Paula de Assis Inês Sofia Romana
- House: Braganza
- Father: Miguel I of Portugal
- Mother: Adelaide of Löwenstein-Wertheim-Rosenberg

Infanta Maria das Neves of Portugal (5 August 1852 – 15 February 1941) was the eldest child and daughter of exiled Miguel I of Portugal and Adelaide of Löwenstein.

== Family and early life ==
Maria das Neves was born in Kleinheubach, an Infanta of Portugal and member of the House of Braganza by birth. She was the eldest daughter of the former Infante Miguel I of Portugal and Princess Adelaide of Löwenstein-Wertheim-Rosenberg. Like her siblings, she was born in exile in the German Empire, as her father had been deposed and perpetually banished from Portugal following the Liberal Wars and the signing of the Convention of Evoramonte.

Disregarding the claims of her two half-sisters legitimized by Miguel I and born during his effective reign, Maria Assunção de Bragança and Maria de Jesus de Bragança, she assumed the position of heiress to her father's claim to the throne of Portugal until the birth of her brother, Miguel Januário de Bragança. During this time, she claimed the title of "Princess Royal of Portugal" (de jure), though it was a title of pretense given her father's deposition in 1834.

Her family included much of Europe's royalty; her paternal grandparents were King John VI of Portugal and Infanta Carlota Joaquina of Spain. She was the niece of Emperor Pedro I of Brazil, and a first cousin of Emperor Pedro II of Brazil and Queen Maria II of Portugal. Through her marriage to Infante Alfonso Carlos, Duke of San Jaime, the Carlist claimant to the Spanish throne, Maria was also the titular Queen consort of Spain, France, and Navarre.

== Marriage ==
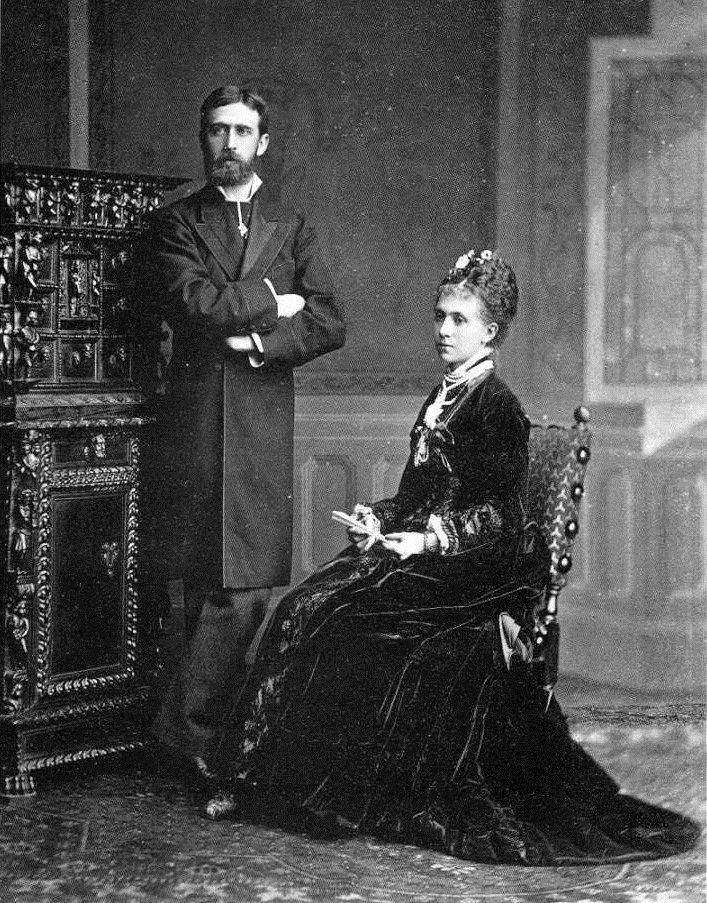
Maria das Neves with her husband, Infante Alfonso Carlos, Duke of San Jaime.

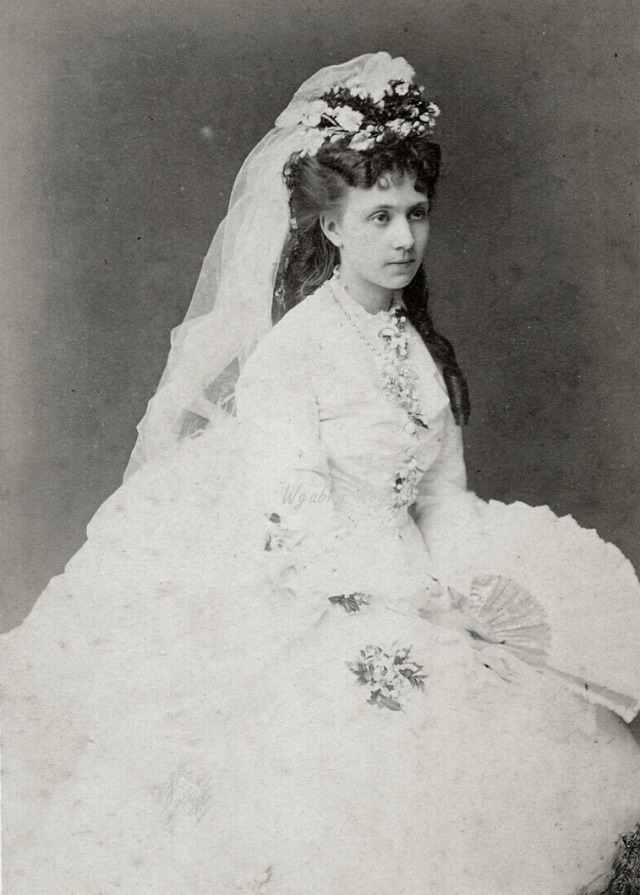
Maria in her wedding dress, 1871

Maria married Infante Alfonso Carlos, Duke of San Jaime, second son of Infante Juan, Count of Montizón and his wife Archduchess Maria Beatrix of Austria-Este, on 26 April 1871 in Kleinheubach. Alfonso Carlos was her first cousin once removed, as Maria's father (Miguel I of Portugal) and his paternal grandmother (Infanta Maria Francisca of Portugal) were siblings. Their union produced only a son who died some hours after his birth, in 1874. They were unable to have more children and died childless. Maria died in Vienna, Austria, aged 88.

== See also ==
- Descendants of Miguel I of Portugal

== Ancestry ==
Ancestors of Infanta Maria das Neves of Portugal

8. Peter III of Portugal
4. John VI of Portugal and Brazil
9. Maria I of Portugal and Brazil
2. Miguel I of Portugal
10. Charles IV of Spain
5. Infanta Carlota Joaquina of Spain
11. Princess Maria Luisa of Parma
1. Infanta Maria das Neves of Portugal
12. Charles Thomas, Prince of Löwenstein
6. Constantine, Hereditary Prince of Löwenstein
13. Countess Sophie of Windisch-Graetz
3. Princess Adelaide of Löwenstein
14. Karl Ludwig, Prince of Hohenlohe-Langenburg
7. Princess Agnes of Hohenlohe-Langenburg
15. Countess Amalie Henriette of Solms-Baruth

Infanta Maria das Neves of Portugal House of Braganza Cadet branch of the House of Aviz Born: 5 August 1852 Died: 15 February 1941
Titles in pretence
| Vacant Title last held by Berthe of Rohan | — TITULAR — Queen consort of Spain; Carlist; 2 October 1931 – 29 September 1936 | Vacant Title next held by Madeleine de Bourbon-Busset |
| Vacant Title last held by Berthe of Rohan | — TITULAR — Queen consort of France; Legitimist; 2 October 1931 – 29 September 1936 | Succeeded by Victoria Eugenie of Battenberg |
