= Princess Elvira of Bourbon =

Spanish and French Princess

Princess Elvira
- Princess of Bourbon
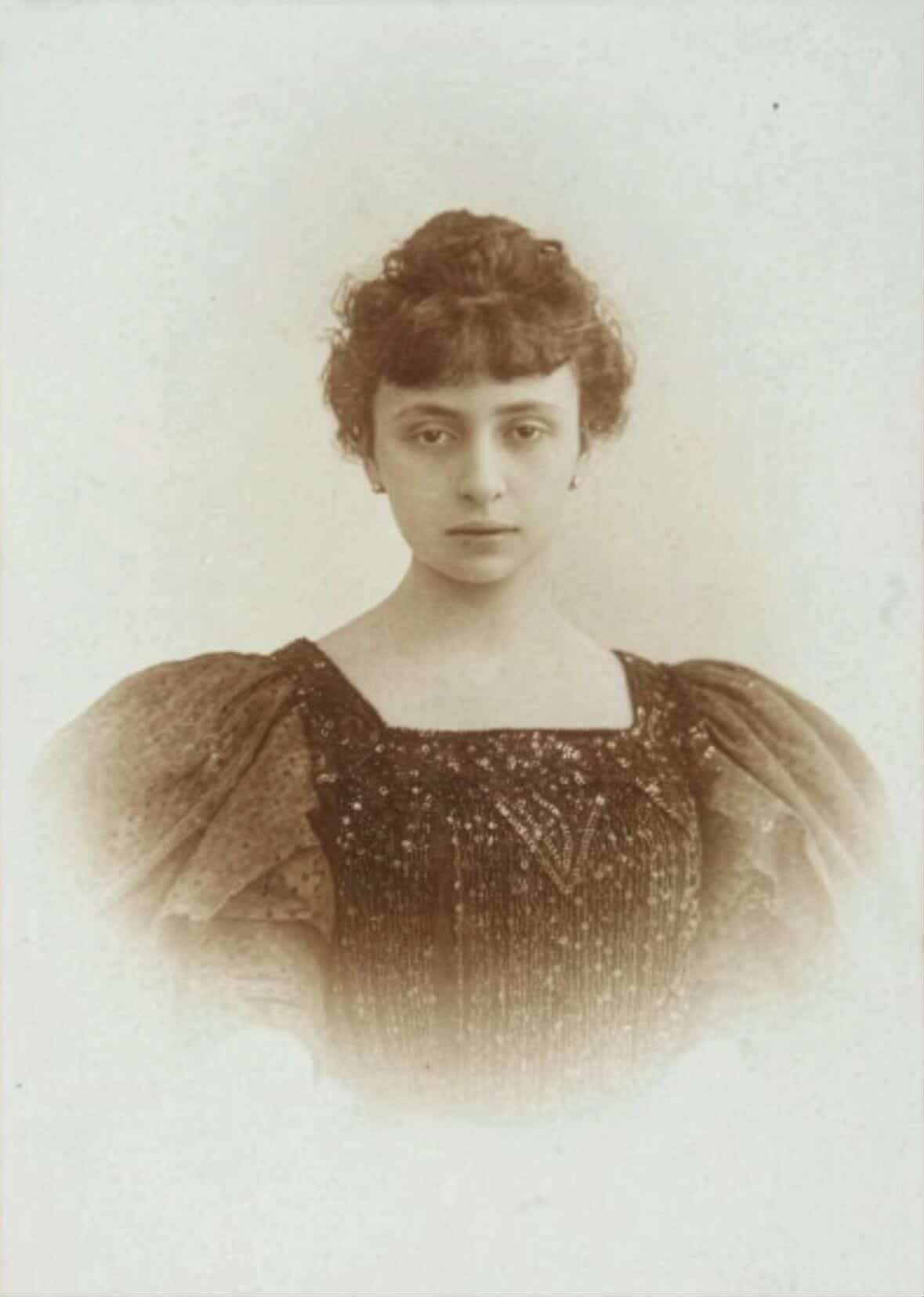
- Elvira around 1895
- Born: 28 July 1871; Geneva, Switzerland
- Died: 9 December 1929 (aged 58); Paris, France
- Burial: Tenuta Reale (Viareggio), Viareggio, Kingdom of Italy
- Issue: Giorgio di Borbone (illegitimate son); Léon Fulco di Borbone (illegitimate son); Filiberto di Borbone (illegitimate son)
Names
- Elvira María Teresa Enriqueta de Borbón
- House: Bourbon-Anjou
- Father: Prince Carlos, Duke of Madrid
- Mother: Princess Margherita of Bourbon-Parma

Princess Elvira of Bourbon (In French: Princesse Elvire Marie-Thérèse Henriette de Bourbon; Spanish: Elvira María Teresa Enriqueta de Borbón; 28 July 1871 – 9 December 1929) was the second daughter and third child of Prince Carlos, Duke of Madrid, the Carlist claimant to the throne of Spain and the Legitimist claimant to the throne of France, and Princess Margherita of Bourbon-Parma.

Princess of Bourbon by birth she never married. Although her hand in marriage was sought for the heir to the former sovereign to the throne of Tuscany, no such marriage or alliance materialized, as the Emperor Franz Joseph I did not want another Don Carlos’ daughter in his family. While she never married, she had three illegitimate sons with a Florentine artist, Filippo Folchi.

Elvira was educated by nuns in the Sacre Coeur convent school in Florence, chosen by her mother, and her close friend and lady-in-waiting Baroness Emma von Reischach. Her childhood was spent with her parents, travelling between a variety of residences in France, Austria and Italy. The intimate atmosphere of the exiled court came to an end on 29 January 1893, when her mother died and her father become distant with his children. The question of Elvira’s marriage was discussed in the late 1880s and early 1890s. As she was in love with her first-cousin, Archduke Leopold Ferdinand, heir to his father pretence to the defunct throne of Tuscany, they got engaged. Some years later, the Emperor Franz Joseph I, for personal and political reasons, broke Elvira’s engagement.

In 1896, Princess Elvira ran away from Viareggio with the Italian painter Filippo Folchi and she was publicly disowned by her father, Don Carlos. After giving her three sons, he broke and Elvira reconciled with her father on his deathbed, in 1909. Finally, Elvira died in Paris, in 1929 from cancer, at age 58.

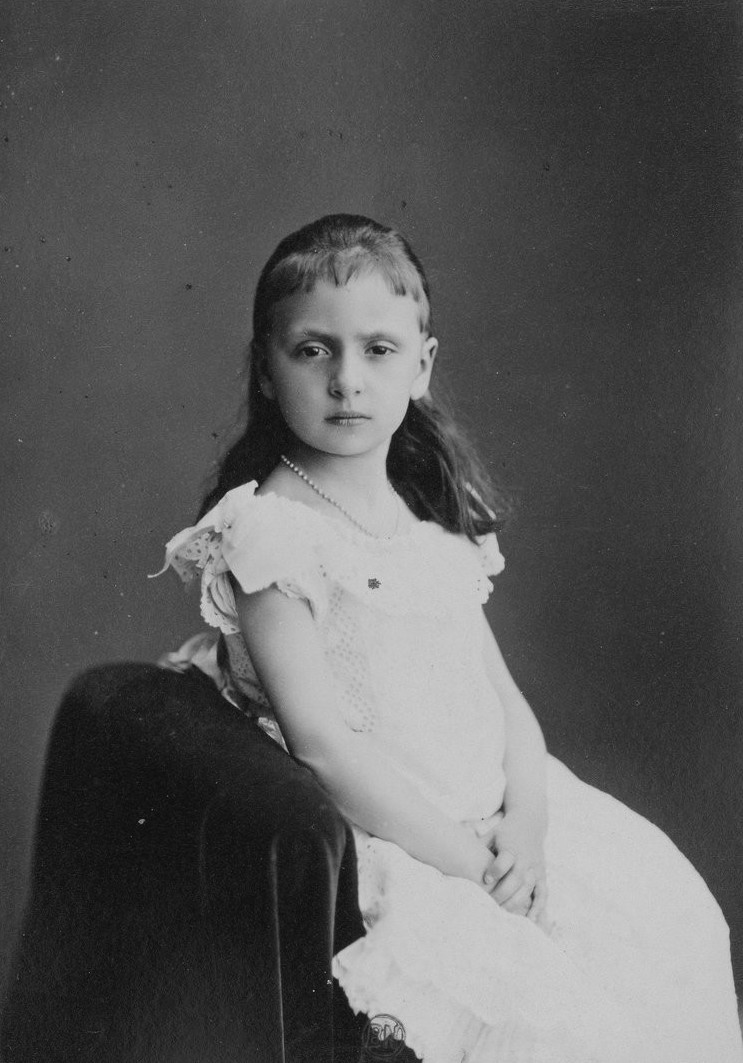
Elvira in 1878 by French photographer Nadar.

== Early life ==
Princess Elvira was born on 28 July 1871 at the Villa Bocage, Geneva, Switzerland as the middle of five children. Her father was Prince Carlos, Duke of Madrid, the first child of Juan, Count of Montízon and his wife, Archduchess Maria Beatrix of Austria-Este. Her mother was Princess Margherita of Bourbon-Parma, the first child of Duke Charles III of Parma and Princess Louise of France.

She was baptised in the private chapel at the Villa Bocage on 1st August 1871. Her godparents were the Count of Chambord (Princess Margherita’s maternal uncle) and his wife, the Countess of Chambord (the Duke of Madrid’s maternal aunt).

Her father organized and led the Third Carlist War between 1872 and 1876. During this time, Margherita and their children stayed in Pau, near the border. After the war, they lived in Paris for five years, until the French government banished them because of Carlos's political activities.

Her parents separated in 1881. Don Carlos went to live in Venice, while Margherita and the children went into exile in Tuscany, where they settled in the Tenuta Reale, the ancient villa of the Dukes of Parma in Viareggio. Elvira and her sisters attended the Sacre Coeur convent school in Florence. The children were very close to their mother, who had decided to place generosity and kindness at the heart of her children's education.

== Romance with Leopold Ferdinand ==
When she was fifteen, Elvira fell in love with her cousin, Archduke Leopold Ferdinand of Austria, who was the eldest son of her aunt Alice. They were secretly engaged between 1885 and 1889. In 1889, Elvira's older sister Blanca married Leopold's cousin and namesake, Archduke Leopold Salvator. Leopold later described Elvira as

"A wild, elfin gipsy. She had a way of standing erect and unconscious of herself; her young body, taut and lithesome, and one day when I said to her: "Elvira, you make me think of the twig of a fresh young tree, which I just long to bend," she was rather offended. The most precious of her charms was her manifest purity. That always disarmed me."

The engagement was supported by Elvira's mother and Leopold's father, but the Emperor Franz Joseph forbade their union. Leopold blamed Archduke Albrecht, Duke of Teschen, for influencing Franz Joseph. Albrecht's niece was the Dowager Queen Christina of Spain, and he had funded her efforts to repress the Carlist risings in Spain. Elvira and Leopold never met again after the Emperor's refusal, but near the end of his life, in his memoirs, he described her as "the love of his life". Nevertheless, he married three times and fathered a child with a prostitute.

== Scandal ==
Princess Elvira was considered as a potential bride for Prince Ferdinand Pius, Duke of Calabria but he declined it in 1895. The prince also declined Elvira's sisters which enjoyed their grandmother Archduchess Maria Beatrix. In 1896, Princess Elvira ran away from Viareggio with the Italian painter Filippo Folchi. He was nine years her senior, a commoner, and already married to a woman, whom he already had two sons with (both fathered before their marriage). Her family was outraged. Elvira’s father made an official announcement, which read:

“To the Carlists. You are my family, my beloved children, and I consider it my duty to announce to you that one of my daughters, the former Infanta Doña Elvira, has died for all of us.”

The couple lived in Florence, and had three sons together, including twins:

1. Giorgio di Borbone (20 May 1900 – 19 March 1941), killed by Greek soldiers in Albania during the Second World War.
2. Léon Fulco di Borbone (22 June 1904 – 11 October 1962), who moved to the United States. His wife Anita Vazquez y Carrizosa was the sister of his brother's wife Lucia.
3. Filiberto di Borbone (22 June 1904 – 1 March 1968), who moved to the United States. His wife Lucia Vazquez y Carrizosa was the sister of his brother's wife Anita.

As their father never officially recognized the children, they all bore Elvira's last name. Within a decade, Filippo Folchi married another woman, Italian aristocrat Romilda dei Conti Noghera, who was twenty years younger than Elvira. With her, he would father three more sons.

== Later life and death ==
In 1909, Elvira reconciled with her father on his deathbed. After the First World War, in which her eldest son had fought as a lieutenant, Elvira moved to Paris, France. She died there of cancer in 1929, aged 58. She was buried in Viareggio.
