= Princess Berthe de Rohan =

Berthe de Rohan
- Duchess of Madrid
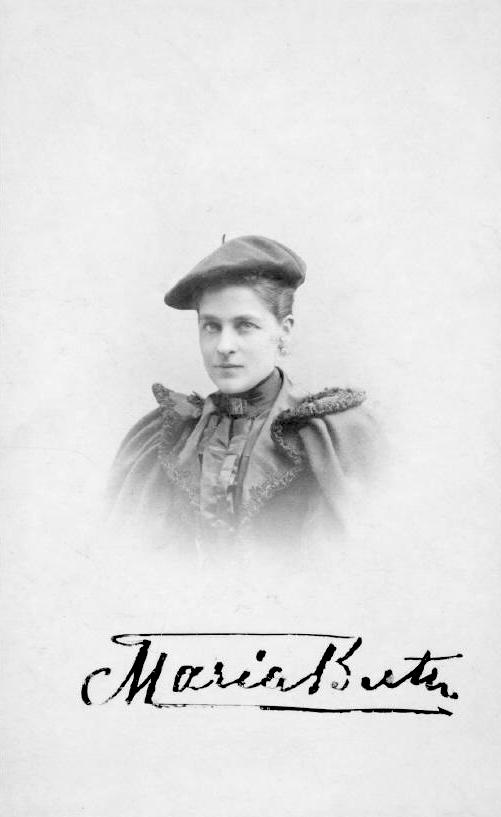

Consort of the Carlist pretender to the Spanish throne and the Legitimist claimant to the French throne
- Pretence: 28 April 1894 – 18 July 1909
- Born: 21 May 1868; Teplitz, Kingdom of Bohemia, Austria-Hungary
- Died: 19 January 1945 (aged 76); Vienna, Greater German Reich
- Spouse: Carlos, Duke of Madrid (m. 1894; died 1909)
Names
- French: Marie-Berthe Françoise Félicie Jeanne; German: Maria-Bertha Franziska Felicia Johanne
- House: Rohan
- Father: Arthur of Rohan, Prince of Rochefort
- Mother: Countess Gabriela of Waldstein-Wartenberg

Berthe de Rohan (French: Marie-Berthe Françoise Félicie Jeanne de Rohan, Princesse de Rohan; 21 May 1868 – 19 January 1945) was a Princess of Rohan and member of the House of Rohan by birth. She was born in Teplitz, Kingdom of Bohemia, Austria-Hungary. Through her marriage to Carlist claimant to the Spanish throne, Berthe became a member of the House of Bourbon and titular Queen consort of Spain, France, and Navarre.

== Early life ==
Marie-Berthe Françoise Félicie Jeanne was the ninth and youngest child of Prince Arthur of Rohan (1826-1885) (son of Prince Benjamin de Rohan-Rochefort-Guéménée and Princess Stephanie of Croÿ) and his wife, Countess Maria Gabriela of Waldstein-Wartenberg (1827-1890) (daughter of Count Christian Vinzenz Ernst von Waldstein-Wartenberg and Countess Maria Franziska of Thun und Hohenstein).

== Marriage ==
Berthe married Carlos de Bourbon, Duke of Madrid, eldest son of Juan de Bourbon, Count of Montizón and his wife Archduchess Maria Beatrix of Austria-Este, on 28 April 1894 in Prague.

After the death of his first wife Princess Margherita of Bourbon-Parma, their union was encouraged by his mother Archduchess Maria Beatrix of Austria-Este (1824–1906), but produced no issue.

== Death ==
Berthe died in relative obscurity in Vienna, Greater German Reich, at the age of 76. She was buried in Klosterkirche, Döbling, Austria.

== Gallery ==
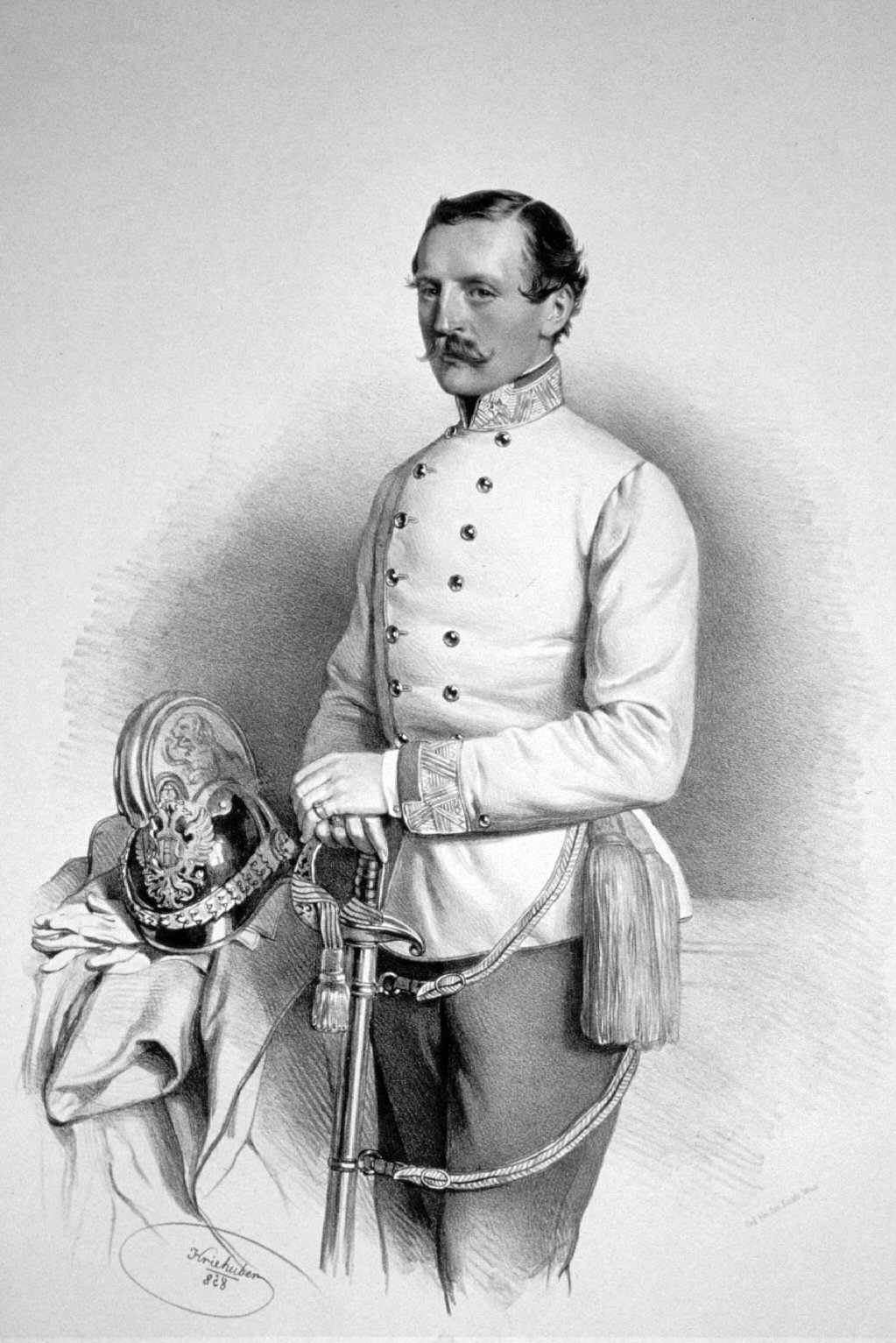
Berthe's father: Prince Arthur of Rohan (1826-1885)

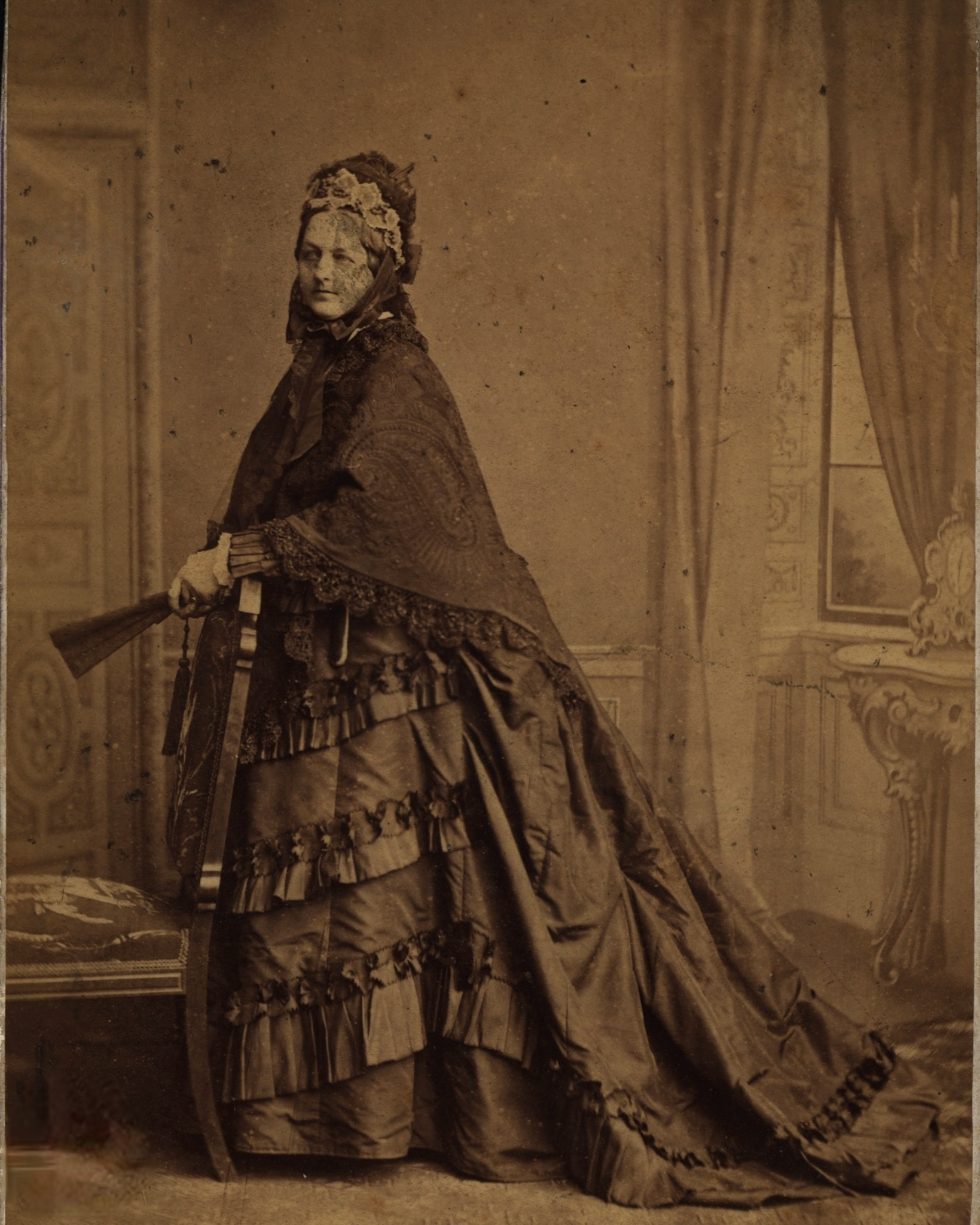
Berthe's mother: Princess Gabriele of Rohan, née Countess of Waldstein-Wartenberg (1827-1890)

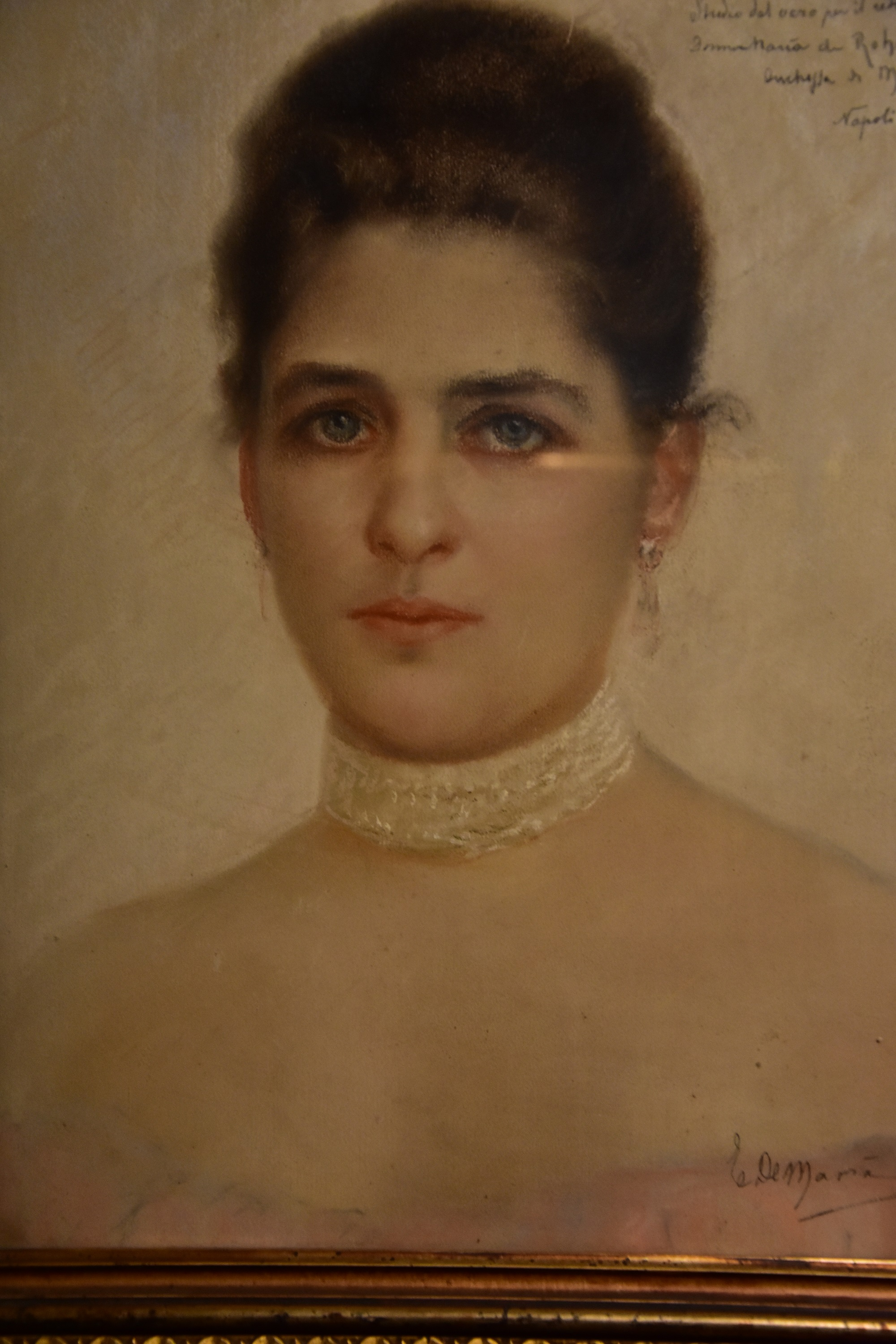
Portrait of Berthe de Rohan (1894) by Ettore De Maria Bergler

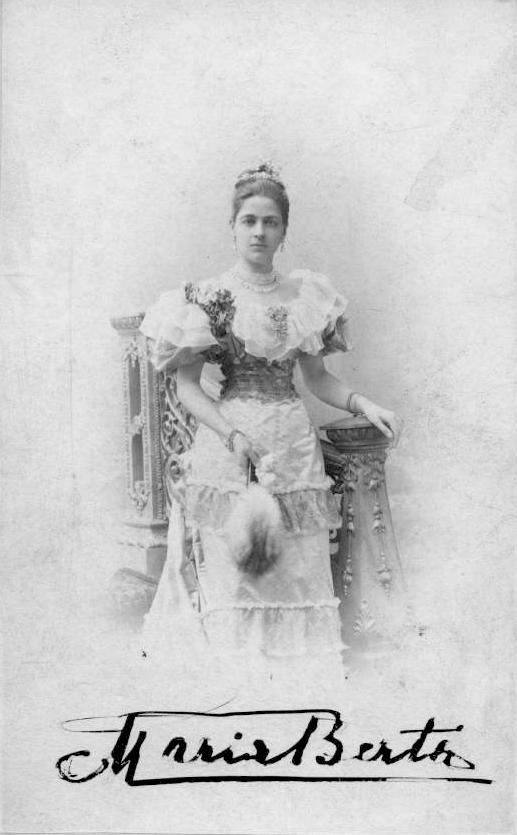
Bethe in 1907

== Ancestry ==
Ancestors of Princess Berthe de Rohan

8. Prince Charles Gaspard de Rohan-Rochefort
4. Benjamin de Rohan, Prince of Rochefort, Guéméné and Montauban
9. Princess Marie Louise Joséphine de Rohan-Guéméné
2. Arthur de Rohan, Prince of Rochefort
10. Auguste Philippe de Croÿ, 9th Duke of Croÿ
5. Princess Stephanie of Croÿ
11. Anne Victurnienne de Rochechouart
1. Berthe de Rohan
12. Ernst Philipp, Count of Waldstein-Wartenberg
6. Kristian Vincenc, Count of Waldstein-Wartenberg
13. Franziska Antonia des Fours-Walderode
3. Countess Gabriela of Waldstein-Wartenberg
14. Count Anton of Thun und Hohenstein
7. Countess Maria Franziska of Thun and Hohenstein
15. Countess Maria Theresia Wratislaw von Mitrowitz

Princess Berthe de Rohan House of Rohan Born: 21 May 1868 Died: 19 January 1945
Titles in pretence
Vacant Title last held by Margherita of Bourbon-Parma	— TITULAR — Queen consort of Spain; Carlist; 28 April 1894 – 18 July 1909	Vacant Title next held by Maria das Neves of Portugal
Vacant Title last held by Margherita of Bourbon-Parma	— TITULAR — Queen consort of France; Legitimist; 28 April 1894 – 18 July 1909	Vacant Title next held by Maria das Neves of Portugal
