= Blancs d'Espagne =

Blancs d'Espagne ("Spanish Whites") was a term used to refer to those legitimists in France who, following the death of the Comte de Chambord in 1883, supported the Spanish Carlist claimant rather than the Orleanist candidate, who was supported by the vast majority of French royalists.

The term was generally used by supporters of the Comte de Paris, the Orleanist candidate, as a term of derision for their ultra-legitimist opponents who so hated the House of Orléans that they would support a foreign prince over an Orleanist candidate. It is a pun on the cosmetic and cleanser known as blanc d'Espagne, originally a white lead pigment and later either basic bismuth nitrate or a preparation made from chalk and clay.

== Claimants or declared claimants ==
Portrait	Name	from	until	Relationship with predecessor(s)
	Jean III	24 August 1883	18 November 1887	his great-great-grandfather was brother to the great-great-great-grandfather of Count of Chambord
	Charles XI	18 November 1887	18 July 1909	oldest son
	Jacques I	18 July 1909	2 October 1931	only son
	Charles XII	2 October 1931	29 September 1936	paternal uncle
	Alphonse I	29 September 1936	28 February 1941	second cousin once removed (his great-grandfather was brother to grandfather of Alphonse I
	Henri VI	28 February 1941	20 March 1975	oldest living son (second son)
	Alphonse II	20 March 1975	30 January 1989	oldest son
	Louis XX	30 January 1989	onwards	oldest living son (second son)
