= Prince Jaime, Duke of Anjou and Madrid =

Historical claimant to the throne of Spain

Jaime de Bourbon
- Duke of Anjou and Madrid
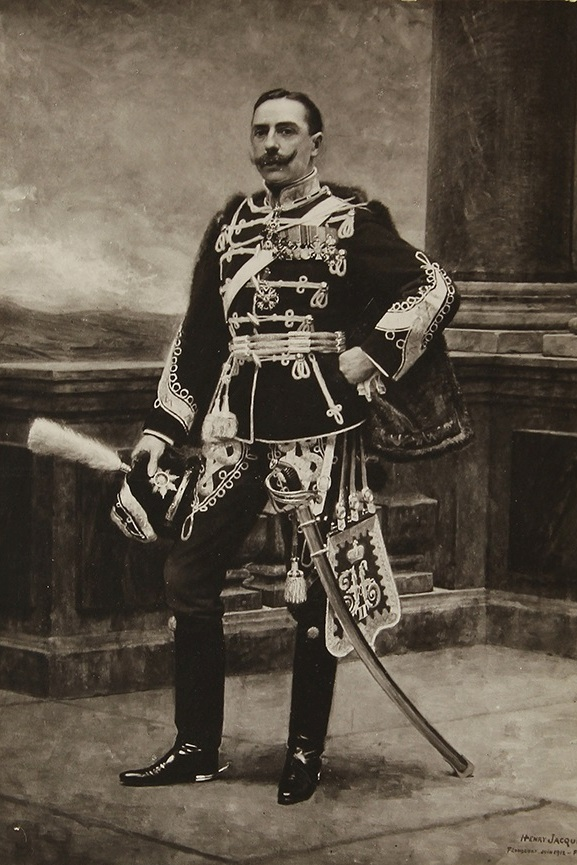
- Don Jaime de Bourbon, 1911

Legitimist claimant to the French throne and Carlist pretender to the Spanish throne
- Pretence: 18 July 1909 – 2 October 1931
- Predecessor: Prince Carlos, Duke of Madrid
- Successor: Prince Alfonso Carlos, Duke of Anjou and San Jaime
- Born: 7 June 1870; Vevey, Switzerland
- Died: 2 October 1931 (aged 61); Paris, France
Names
- Don Jaime de Borbón y de Borbón-Parma and Jacques de Bourbon
- House: Bourbon
- Father: Prince Carlos, Duke of Madrid
- Mother: Princess Margherita of Bourbon-Parma

Royal styles of Jaime de Bourbon
- Reference style: His Royal Highness
- Spoken style: Your Royal Highness

Prince Jaime de Bourbon, known as the Duke of Anjou and Madrid (French: Jacques de Bourbon; 27 June 1870 – 2 October 1931), was the Legitimist claimant to the throne of France as Jacques I and the holder of the Carlist claim to the throne of Spain under the name Jaime III, from 18 July 1909 until his death in 2 October 1931.

== Family ==
Don Jaime was never married and probably had no children.

=== Parents ===
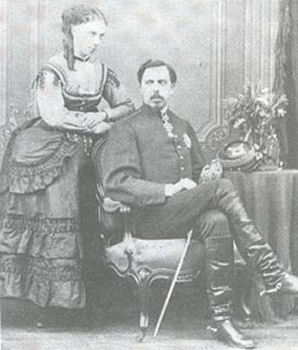
Jaime’s parents: Don Carlos and Princess Margherita, late 1860s

Don Jaime's father, Don Carlos de Bourbon (1848–1909), as Carlos VII was the 4th successive claimant to the Carlist throne (1868–1909) and later as Charles XI a legitimist claimant to the French one (1887–1909). Don Jaime's mother, Marguerite de Bourbon-Parme (1847–1893), was daughter to the second-last ruling Duke of Parma and sister to the last ruler of the Duchy of Parma. In 1894 Don Jaime's father remarried with Berthe de Rohan, an Austrian aristocrat and a descendant to one of the greatest French aristocrats family, but the couple had no children.

=== Own marriage plans and speculations ===
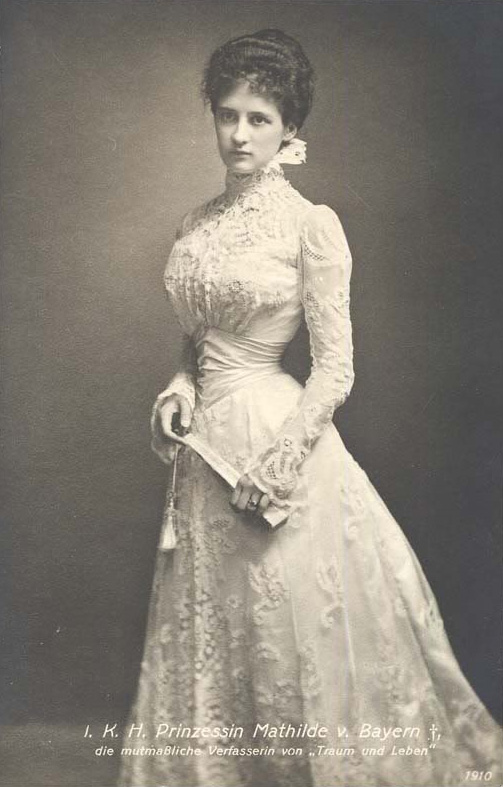
Mathilde of Bavaria

Already when Jaime was 15 there were rumors about alleged Alfonsist plans to get him married with Mercedes, daughter to Alfonso XII; the word kept circulating during the following years. When he was 26, Don Jaime developed at least cordial correspondence with Mathilde, daughter of Prince Ludwig of Bavaria. In unclear circumstances, possibly related to intrigues of his stepmother and political problems with Madrid the relationship dried up. Though when later serving in the Russian army in Warsaw Don Jaime had women in his mind there is no confirmation of any amorous episodes. In his mid-30s he was rumored to marry Maria Sol Stuart Fitz-James, Maria Annunciata of Austria, and Louise of Orléans. In fact, he was attracted to a 16-year-old Bourbon-Parma cousin Maria Antonia, but apparently realised impracticability of the would-be relationship. Don Jaime soon started to pursue her slightly older sister Zita; though some claim that the two were about to get married the girl has never watched her cousin favourably. Rumors related to Princess Patricia of Connaught and a niece of Kaiser Wilhelm II followed; there was also a lawsuit about allegedly Don Jaime's son born by his former cook. When he was in his mid-40s the alarm bells were already ringing very loud and succession became a burning political issue. About to turn 50 Don Jaime mounted matrimonial plans focused on Fabiola Massimo, his 19-year-old niece; he already approached the Vatican about a dispensation. The permission has reportedly been denied, either due to protests of his brother-in-law or intrigues of the Madrid court. When he was in his 50s newspapers floated news about Don Jaime's designs related to unnamed "princesas austriacas", "a distinguished French lady" or Blanca de Borbón y León. The last rumours were circulated when aged 58, he was supposed to marry Filipa de Bragança. It seems that at least not all of these speculations should be dismissed as entirely ungrounded.

== Childhood and youth ==
The formative years of Don Jaime are marked by absence of one or another parent; except the years of 1877–1880 the couple spent most of their time apart. Since turning 10 the boy lived away from the family boarded in various educational institutions, meeting his parents and sisters during short holiday spells; the exception were the years of 1886–1889, spent mostly with his mother and siblings in Viareggio. Don Jaime was growing up in rather cosmopolitan ambience, exposed to French, Spanish, German, English and Italian cultures; as a teenager he was already fluent in all these languages.

=== Childhood ===
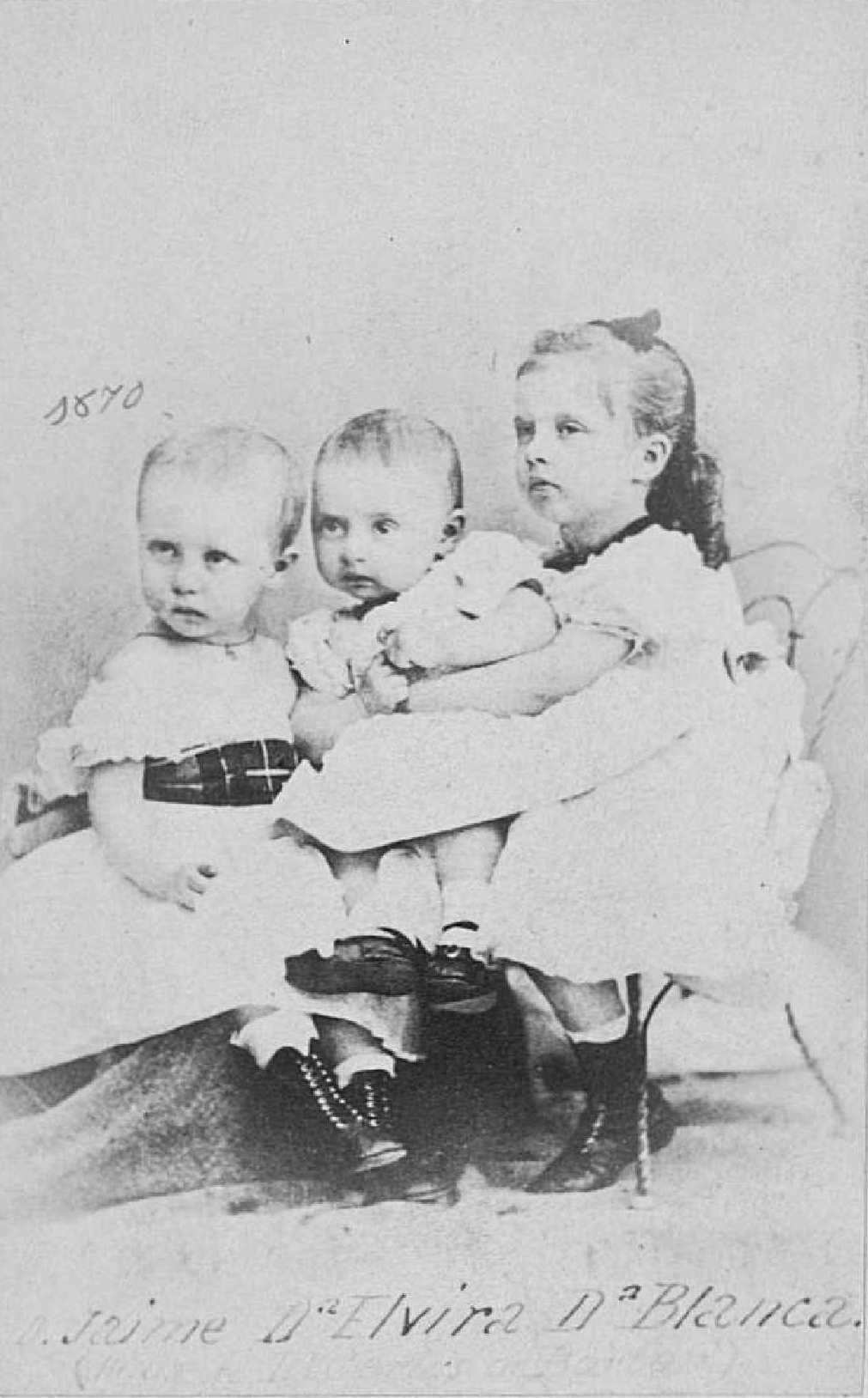
With sisters, ca 1872

The birth of Don Jaime was celebrated in the Carlist realm as an extension of the dynasty, the baby greeted by hundreds of messages as the future king of Spain. Initially Jaime remained with his parents and slightly older sister in Palais La Faraz, a mansion occupied by the family in Tour de Peilz near Vevey. In 1871 they moved to Villa Bocage in Geneva, where Jaime's mother gave birth to another of his sisters. In 1873 Margarita de Borbón, her 3 children and a small quasi-court of assistants, secretaries and servants transferred to Ville du Midi in Pau. At that time Carlos VII was in Spain leading his troops during the Third Carlist War; in 1874 the boy with his mother visited his father on the Carlist-held territory and dressed in uniform, was cheered with frenetic enthusiasm by Carlist soldiers. Upon return to Pau Margarita gave birth to two more daughters before in September 1876 the mother, 5 children and royal entourage – including preceptors of the boy – settled in a hotel at Rue de la Pompe in Paris. Don Carlos was mostly travelling, first on a journey to America and then to the Balkans; he joined the family in late 1877. Either in late 1876 or in early 1877 Don Jaime started frequenting Collège de l'Immaculée-Conception at Rue de Vaugirard, a prestigious Jesuit establishment. Initially the boy followed a challenging semi-board pattern; waking up as early as 4:30 am he travelled by public transport to the college and for the night he used to return to his family. This changed in 1880, when due to political pressure of the French government Carlos VII was forced to leave France and settled in Venice. At that time relations between Don Jaime's parents have already turned sour; doña Margarita decided not to accompany her husband and settled in own estate near Viareggio. With his parents away, until completing the curriculum in 1881 the boy lived on the college premises with other students.

=== Teenager ===
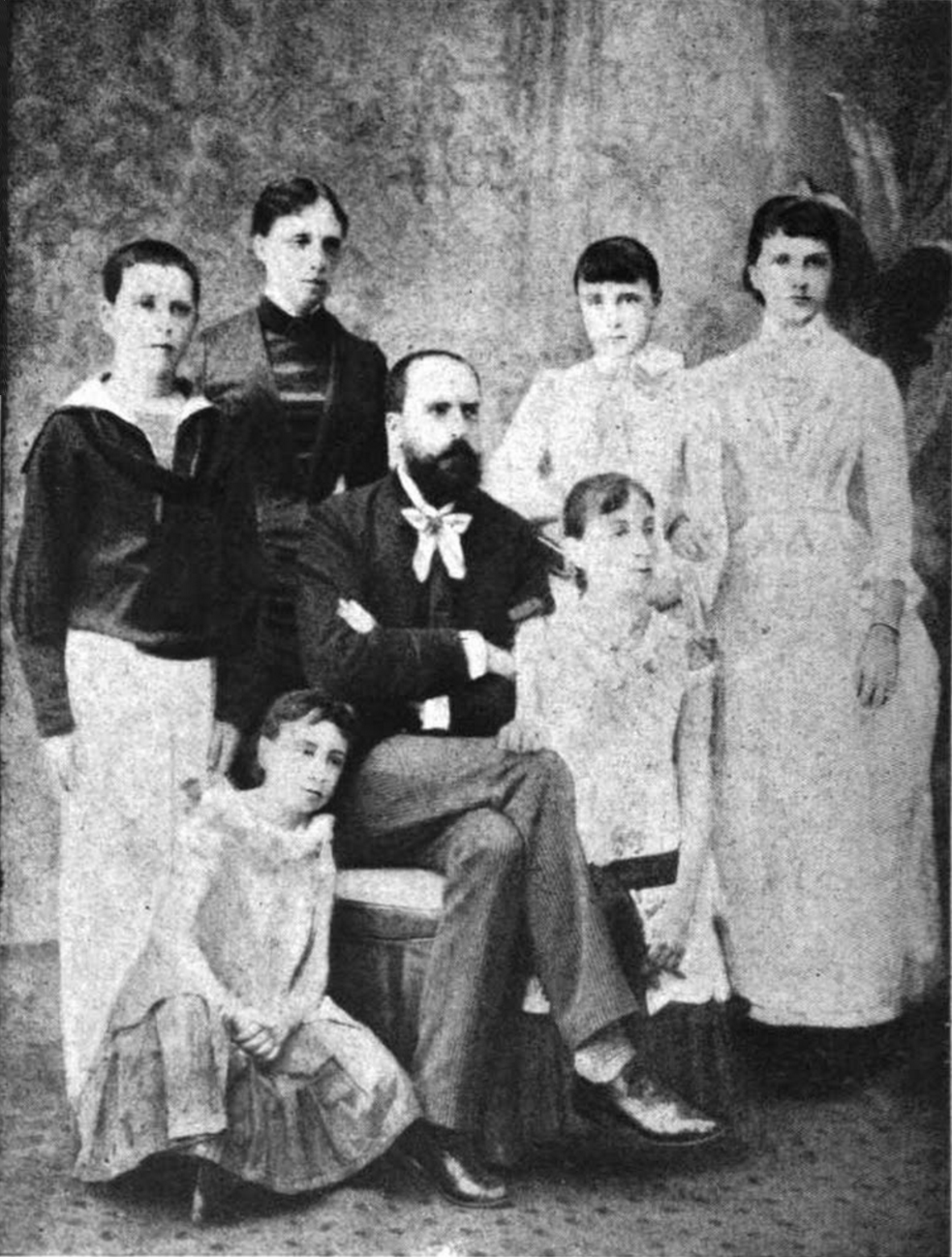
With parents and sisters, early 1880s

Following a summer break with his parents in Italy in 1881 Don Jaime entered Beaumont College, prestigious Jesuit establishment in Old Windsor near London. It was catering to Catholic aristocracy from all over Europe, though the largest contingent was formed by Irish boys. Initially Jaime lived with his old preceptor Barrena, who settled in Windsor to facilitate accommodation even though James Hayes was chosen as a new spiritual guide; in 1882 Barrena left and Jaime moved to common dormitory. As perhaps the most prestigious student he received special treatment. Visited by parents and paternal grandfather, who lived in Brighton, Jaime used to spend holidays in Viareggio or Venice. It seems that his relations with other boys were good, though he tended to patronising and excess of ambition. Don Jaime completed the Beaumont curriculum in May 1886. The same year he inherited from the Chambords part of their fortune and real estates in Austria, in particular the Frohsdorf palace. There were plans about further education in Stella Matutina in Feldkirch, but most of 1887 was spent on recovery from very serious health problems, which had earlier prompted some papers to report his agony; part of the scheme was Don Jaime's trip with his Bardi uncles to Egypt and Palestine. Following return to Viareggio in 1888 he embarked on his first diplomatic mission to Vatican; he was also subject to dynastic speculations related to Nocedalista break-up in Spain and these about his future military education in England and would-be service in India. He seems to have stayed with his mother and sisters in Viareggio rather than with his father in Venice, in 1889 recorded as travelling across Europe either on family business, e.g. to attend the wedding of his sister in Frohsdorf, or on leisure, e.g. with his mother visiting the galleries and museums of Paris.

=== Early adult years ===
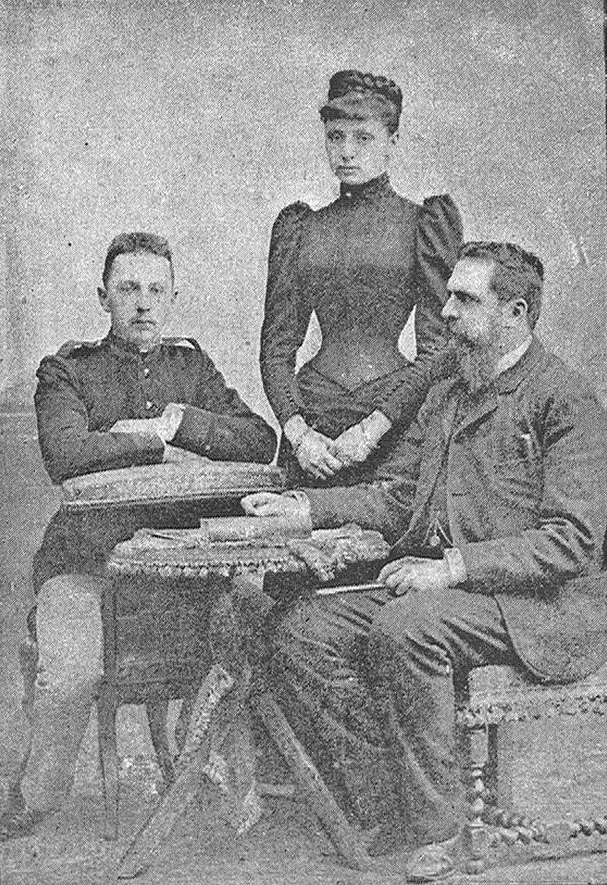
Don Jaime with father and sister, 1891

It is not clear whether Carlos VII has discussed with the British his alleged vision of Don Jaime pursuing a military career in England. Eventually in 1890 Don Jaime indeed commenced military education, though not in Sandhurst but in Theresianische Militärakademie in Wiener Neustadt. Still considered childish by his mother, he was accompanied by a family trustee, Miguel Ortigosa. Almost no details on Don Jaime's military education are available and it is not known whether and if yes what army branch he opted for. According to his later opponents in the academy Don Jaime became loose on his Catholic practices and got somewhat derailed from Traditionalist track. He graduated in 1893, but mounting political differences between Carlos VII and the kaiser produced a disaster: Don Jaime was neither promoted to officer rank nor admitted to the imperial army. The years of 1894–1895 were dedicated mostly to travelling, be it distant voyages like the tour to India, Siam, Indoniesia and the Philippines, or shorter trips, e.g. to the Spanish Morocco. It was in 1894 that for the first time since the early childhood days he visited Spain; officially incognito and accompanied by a Vasco-Navarrese Carlist leader Tirso de Olazábal, during his 37-day tour Don Jaime was many times identified. He gave rise to a number of rather friendly anecdotes, while his journey was widely discussed in the press. Most likely in the mid-1890s Don Carlos explored perspectives of his son commencing a military career in one of major European armies. Don Jaime's service in the imperial Austrian army was out of the question; it is not clear whether the British or the German army was at any point considered an option. Eventually Don Carlos renewed his 1877 relations with the St. Petersburg court and some time late 1895 it was agreed that Don Jaime would join the Russian army.

== Warsaw spell ==
Between April and June 1896 Don Jaime joined a cavalry unit in Odessa, where he performed a routine garrison service. In late 1897 he received a transfer order to Warsaw, where he arrived in late March or early April 1898. He spent there almost 6 years on the highly intermittent basis, until he departed for Austria in late 1903. Though in terms of his political career Don Jaime's stay in the city was of little relevance, it is not clear to what extent the service mattered as his formative period.

=== Military career ===
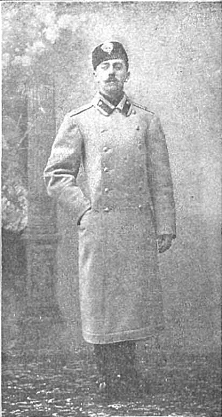
Don Jaime as praporshchik, 1898

Don Jaime arrived in Warsaw following at least half-a-year spell in the Russian army; he had served in a cavalry regiment in Odessa before. It is not clear why the prince left the Black Sea coast and what political, diplomatic or military mechanism got him landed in Warsaw; the choice was probably determined by family logistics. Though convenient travelwise, given the role of Warsaw garrison the assignment was a challenge from military perspective, especially that Don Jaime was assigned to the Life Guard Grodno Hussar Regiment (Гродненский гусарский лейб-гвардии полк). His new unit was a cavalry regiment forming part of the very prestigious if not somewhat snobbish, Russian aristocracy dominated Life-Guard category.

It is not entirely clear what was Don Jaime's rank when he arrived in Warsaw; Spanish press referred to him as "teniente", Polish press referred to him as "chorąży". There is no official Russian document available for consultation; the most likely rank was "Praporshchik" (прапорщик; equivalent to Ensign). On 17 September 1900 he was formally promoted to the rank of "Poruchik" (поручик; equivalent to Lieutenant) and at that rank he served until the end of his actual Warsaw assignment, though in 1904 he was promoted to the rank of "Kapitan" (капитан; equivalent to captain) and finally to "Polkovnik" (полковник; equivalent to Colonel). None of the sources consulted provides any information on Don Jaime's function in the regiment and it is not known whether he served in regimental staff or with any of the squadrons. In late 1902 the press reported that upon return from a just commencing 6-month leave, the following May Don Jaime would intend to seek release from duty, but in late summer 1903 he was still reported serving. In October 1903 he was transferred from the Hussar Regiment to personal staff assigned to the Warsaw district commander.

=== Duration and sub-periods ===
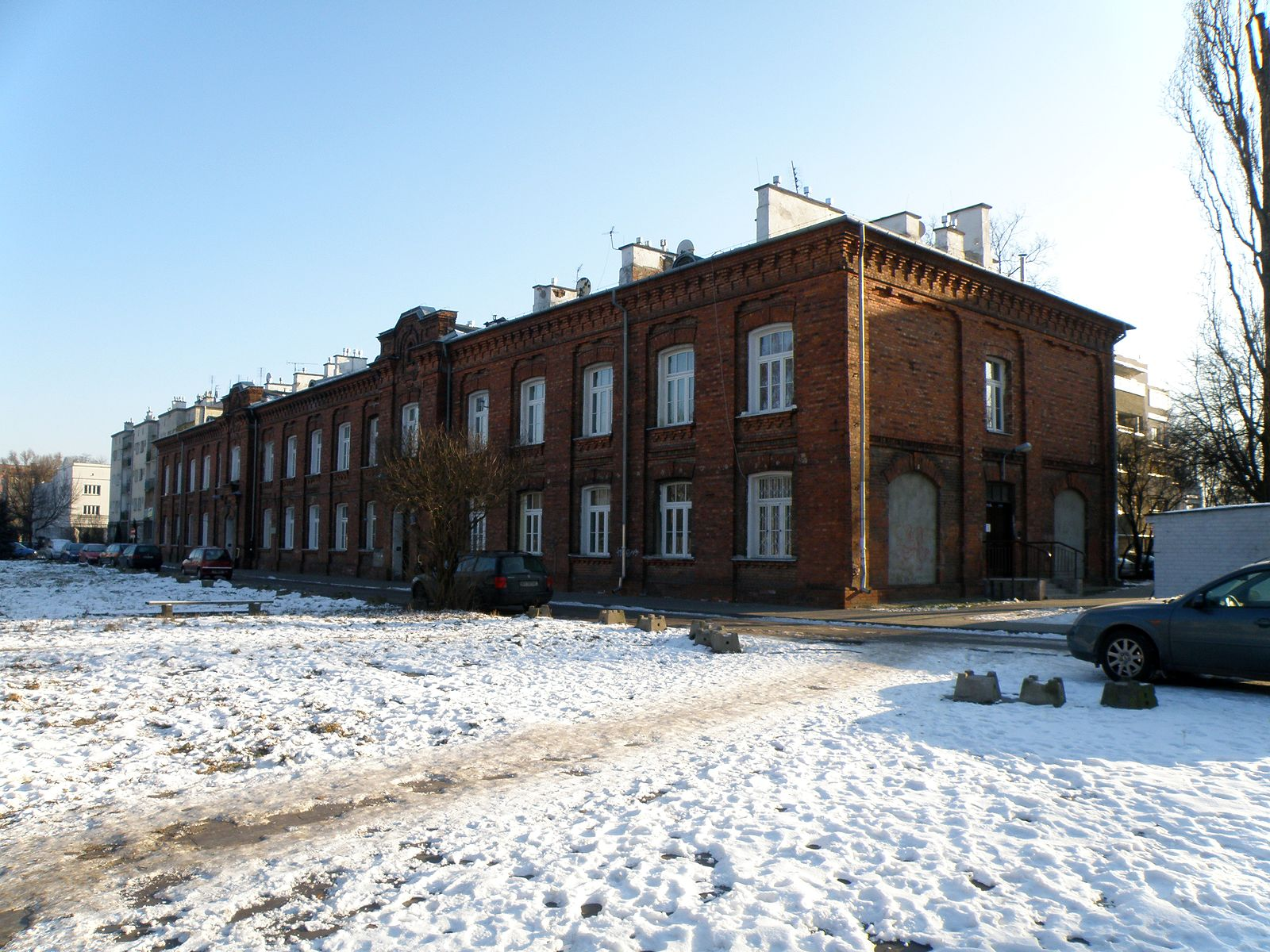
Barracks at the former Агриколя Дольная street.

Though he was formally appointed to Warsaw in December 1897 and though it is likely he spent a few brief spells in the city between 1904 and 1906, there is no confirmation of Don Jaime actually serving in Warsaw before March 1898 and after October 1903. His duty was largely performed on the on and off basis; in-between the above dates he spent in total some 40 months in the city, on average slightly more than half a year per annum. Except 1898 and 1899 he used to leave around November, as allegedly the local autumn weather did not serve him well; Don Jaime was usually returning to service around April. The longest uninterrupted stay identified was between November 1899 and June 1900. Punctuated by at least month-long breaks of leave periods, his service in Warsaw broke down to 8 separate strings.

When away, Don Jaime was either on leave in Austria-Hungary, Italy and France or on service assignments with the Russian army: as member of demarcation commission at Russian frontier with Turkey, Afghanistan and Persia (from summer to fall 1899), in combat units during the Boxer Uprising (from summer 1900 until spring 1901) and during the Russo-Japanese War (starting the spring of 1904). He also spent brief rest periods in the Polish countryside. He was last reported in Warsaw in late autumn of 1903, leaving the city some time by the end of the year. As at that time he was already released from the hussar regiment, it is likely he intended to terminate his Warsaw service. During outbreak of the war against Japan in early 1904 Don Jaime was with his father in Venice, where he was reached by the call to arms; before having been received by Nicholas II in St. Petersburg in March he was likely to have stayed few days in Warsaw, though this was not recorded by the local press. It is also possible—though not confirmed in sources—that he spent few days in Warsaw in June 1905 (en route from Austria to St. Petersburg and back) and in July/August 1906 (en route from Paris to St. Petersburg and back)

=== Break in China ===
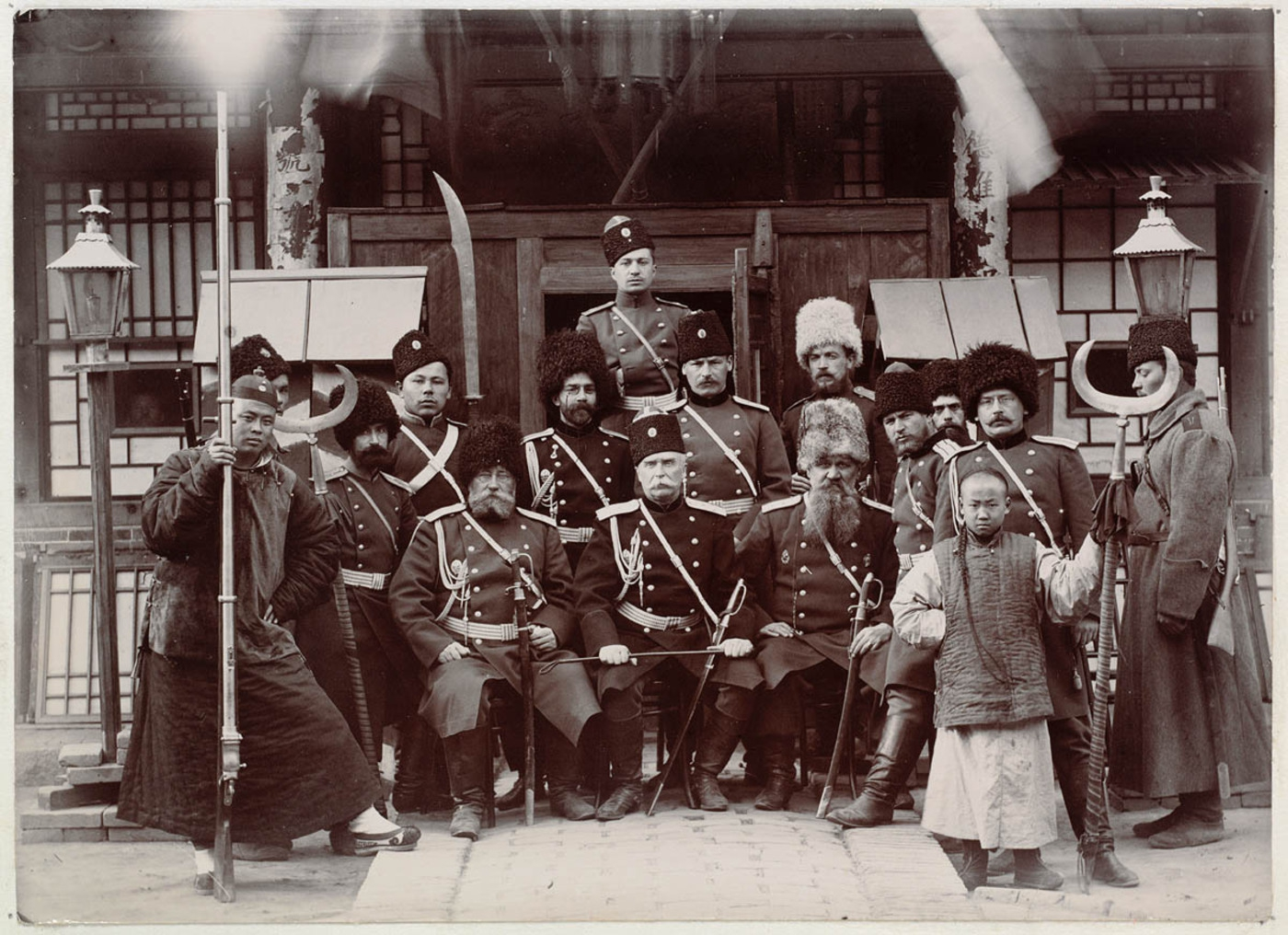
Russian officers in China

Following outbreak of the Boxer Rebellion Don Jaime travelled to St. Petersburg to request permission to join the imperial troops. During a personal meeting the tsar Nicholas II consented but asked him to be careful, as his life belonged "not only to him, but also to his country". In mid-August 1900 Don Jaime left Warsaw for Odessa; he then boarded a Russian military transport ship which took him to Port Arthur, where he joined a Russian contingent He was assigned to the corps of general Konstantin Tserpitsky, whose troops in September advanced in north-eastern China towards the Shanhai Pass. There is almost no verifiable information on Don Jaime's service and some details available look dubious. A hagiographic biography provides conflicting information; on the one hand it suggests that Don Jaime served as Tserpitsky's aide-de-camp, on the other, that he led two Russian companies during a charge or headed reinforcements which came to rescue of a beleaguered French unit.

The episode celebrated in the Carlist narrative was the one which supposedly demonstrated Don Jaime's military competence, but also his Catholic zeal. He reportedly commanded a successful relief assignment, deployed from Shanhaiguan to assist a Belgian-Dutch Catholic mission headed by bishop Conrad Abels and besieged by the Boxers in Manchuria. At great personal cost Don Jaime later obtained tsar's personal authorization to garrison the area despite earlier admiral Alekseyev's orders to withdraw. In December Don Jaime contracted typhus and with high fever he was evacuated to a Russian naval hospital in Nagasaki. From there in February 1901 he sailed to France; in mid-March 1901 Don Jaime arrived in Marseille. Because of his raid which reportedly saved the Belgian religious he was awarded the Order of Leopold; it was also proposed that he is awarded the Legion of Honor, but there is no confirmation that he has actually received it.

=== Private life ===
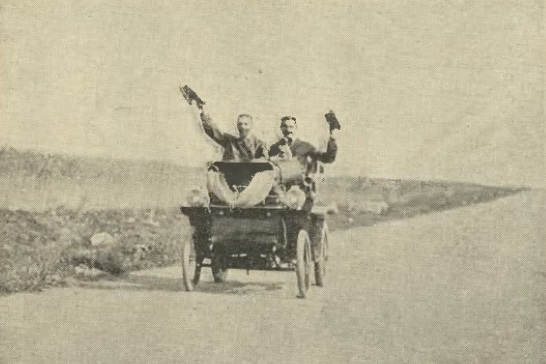
Don Jaime driving automobile at the outskirts of Warsaw, 1900

Initially Don Jaime lived in a semi-rural, military-dominated Sielce suburb, hardly within the administrative city limits; his residence was a modest one-room apartment in the regimental officers' barracks building at Агриколя Дольная street, with two batmen – one of them Spanish – living next door. Starting June 1900 he was already reported as living at Шопена street 8, in a plushy, prestigious area and in a newly constructed apartment building. Despite his modest rank Don Jaime took part in official feasts seated among most prestigious participants, be it members of the House of Romanov, top Russian generals like military district commander or civil officials like president of Warsaw. Very sporadically he was reported as taking part in gatherings of local elites, either those associated with visits of his distant relatives like Ferdinand Duke of Alençon or feasts of apparently unrelated Polish aristocrats like count Mieczysław Woroniecki.

Though possibly familiar with religious hierarchs, in general Don Jaime was not listed as engaged in local community life; he declared spending his free time in theatres and restaurants and indeed was noted there. He was, however, a noticeable city figure as a sportsman; apart from joining the local horse racing society he was particularly recognised for automobile activities. He owned one of the first cars in Warsaw, a De Dion Bouton machine allegedly well recognised by the city dwellers. The only local he seemed to have been in closer relations with was Stanisław Grodzki, a Warsaw automobile pioneer and owner of the first car dealership; local motor fans were greeting Don Jaime when he was launching his automobile trips. Rather accidentally Don Jaime was also acknowledged and cheered as a sportsman by "forgemen, peasants and innkeepers". Spanish press reported Carlist officials departing from Madrid to see him, but the Polish one has not noted any visits paid.

=== Politics ===
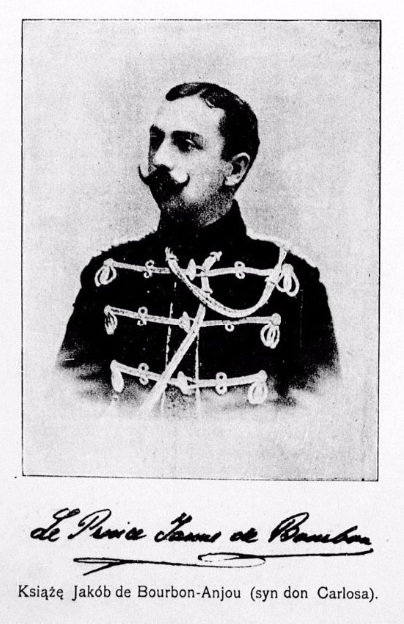
Don Jaime around 1900

The Warsaw press of the era was fairly well informed about developments in Spain, with war against the United States systematically reported and even results of the Cortes elections discussed down to minuscule details; e. g. in 1899 there were 4 Carlists noted as elected. Spanish political life was depicted rather accurately if not indeed prophetically, though at times with some patronising tones. It was acknowledged—even in jokes—that very few Poles knew who the Carlists were. Despite occasional references to Carlism in news columns, cases of linking these reports with Don Jaime residing in Warsaw were rather exceptional. Usually press notes referred to Don Jaime as "His Royal Highness", they were maintained in polite style which has never turned into anything more than sympathetic desinteressement. Not a single case of either hostile or friendly stance towards the Carlists has been identified. Though interviews with Don Jaime adhered to respectful and warm tone, they by no means amounted to political proselytism; some of them sounded slightly ironic about the Carlist cause.

Historically relations between Russia and Carlism have been marked by indifference with occasional demonstrations of mutual sympathy. Don Jaime has not been noted as involved in any political initiatives, though his taking part in official Russian feasts with members of the House of Romanov participating was clearly flavoured with political undertones. At one opportunity the prince made some effort to court the Poles, referring to alleged Polish combatants in ranks of the legitimist troops during the last Carlist war; official Spanish diplomatic services tried to keep a close watch on him. National and social unrest which erupted in Warsaw in 1905 occurred after Don Jaime had already left the city; he had little opportunity to make his own opinion let alone take sides. It is not clear whether vague personal references to the Russian revolution, made by Don Jaime in his 23 April 1931 manifesto, were anyhow related to the 1905 events.

=== Warsaw spell in perspective ===
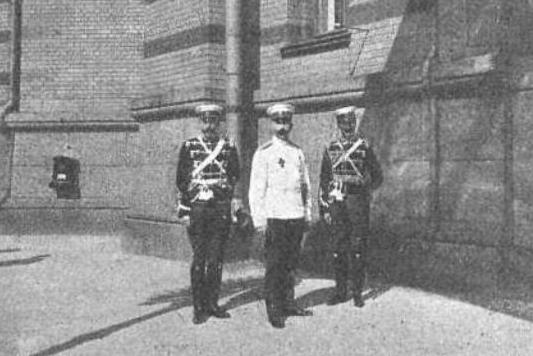
Don Jaime (centre) on garrison duty

Don Jaime joined the Russian army in his mid-20s, in-between youth and mid-age, straightforward, easy-going, just about to get married and to launch his international career. His last, brief Warsaw spells occurred when he was in his mid-30s, a solitary who by some was already viewed as a bit of a disappointment. For the rest of his life he remained a highly ambiguous if not mysterious figure and is as such acknowledged in historiography. It is not clear to what extent service in the Russian army contributed to his formation. Imperial Guards corps officers made a peculiar company, with own identity, values and rituals, especially in an ethnically alien ambience. According to a Polish cliché a cynical lot, their preferred sports were allegedly womanising, drinking and tormenting Jews in the jolly westernmost garrison of the Empire, in Russian officer-speak known as весёлая варшавка. Some of his Carlist opponents claimed that in the early 1900s Don Jaime was already ideologically derailed.

Don Jaime is not known to have publicly and explicitly referred to the Warsaw service in the decades to come. In Spanish historiography the Warsaw spell is usually treated marginally. Don Jaime's military career in the Far East is at times acknowledged as sort of a curiosity, though his service in the Russian army is mentioned when discussing controversies within Carlism related to Spain's role in the First World War. Historiographic works on Carlism focus either on Don Jaime's role in internal strife in the 1910s or on his very last years during Berenguer's dictablanda and the Second Spanish Republic in the early 1930s. In Polish historiography his hussars spell went largely unnoticed. Dedicated works dealing with Spanish-Polish relations acknowledge even brief Polish episodes of celebrities like Pablo Picasso or Carmen Laforet but they ignore Don Jaime, even though along Sofía Casanova (1907–1945) and Ignacio Hidalgo de Cisneros (1950–1962) he is one of the best-known Spaniards permanently residing in Warsaw.

== Infante mid-aged ==
After his departure from Warsaw in late 1903 and before his assumption of the Carlist claim in mid-1909 Don Jaime was already mid-aged. Having served some 7 months in Manchuria during the Russo-Japanese war in 1904 he returned to Europe and set his residence in Paris. Since 1906 he travelled extensively to Spain, but he did not engage in open politics; as the future Carlist king he was merely establishing personal contacts, learning things and making himself known. Relations with his father deteriorated, but not to the point of breakup.

=== Russo-Japanese war ===
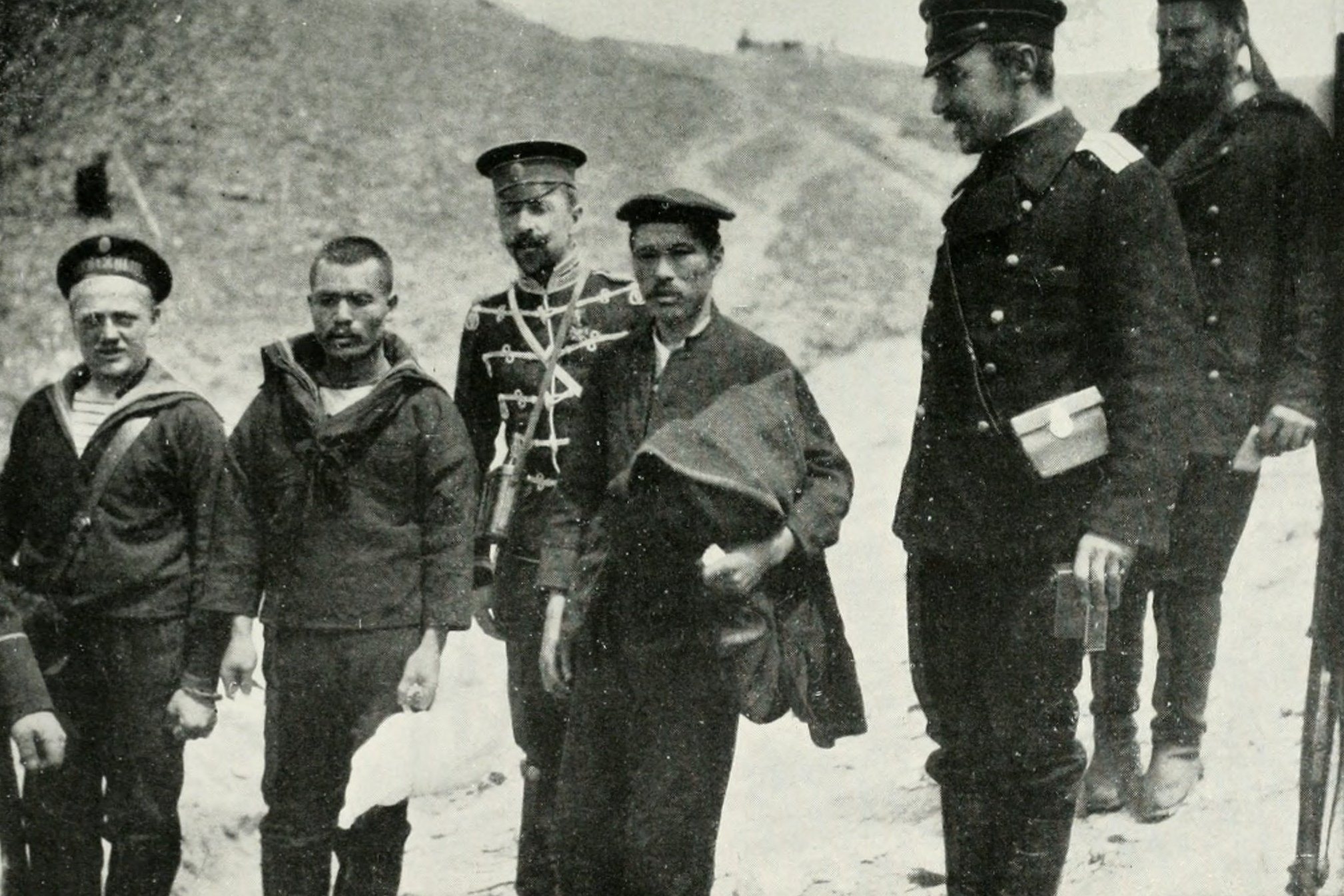
Don Jaime (back, with moustache) with Japanese POWs, 1904

During winter of 1904 Don Jaime was on leave from active service and resided with his father in Venice. It is there that in February he was reached by the call to arms; he was ordered to join imperial troops in the Far East. He first travelled to Moscow, then took the trans-Siberian train and made the last section of his journey aboard a ship on the river Liao. Don Jaime reported on duty to general staff of General Kuropatkin in Port Arthur in early May 1904; he was immediately promoted to captain. As the fortress was coming under the Japanese threat the staff withdrew to Liaoyang, where Don Jaime spent around a month on regular garrison duty; at the time he was injured having fallen from a horse and spent some time using crutches. He was then deployed in the 6. Cavalry Regiment within the 1st Siberian Army Corps, commanded by general Stackelberg. In June he took part in fierce combat during the Battle of Te-li-Ssu, which might have been the 5 most dramatic days of his life. His unit was later withdrawn to Liaoyang.

According to his own account Don Jaime spent the next few weeks of June–July on special missions, including minor skirmishes and scouting in plain clothes beyond the enemy lines. Nearly taken prisoner by the Japanese, he posed as an English press correspondent and managed to make it back to own troops. In August he spent a longer spell on leave in Vladivostok; at that time the press already circulated news about his withdrawal due to health problems, but he returned to line in Mukden in the early autumn. In October he suffered injuries again having fallen from a horse and it is not clear whether he took part in the Battle of Shaho. In November he was awarded the Order of St. Vladimir and was promoted to major. Following an unspecified "special mission" in December 1904 Don Jaime was granted his request to depart for Europe and later that month he left the Kuropatkin's staff in Mukden. Having travelled by train across eastern China he arrived in Saigon. From there he sailed to Marseille, back in Europe in early May 1905.

=== Eternal voyager ===
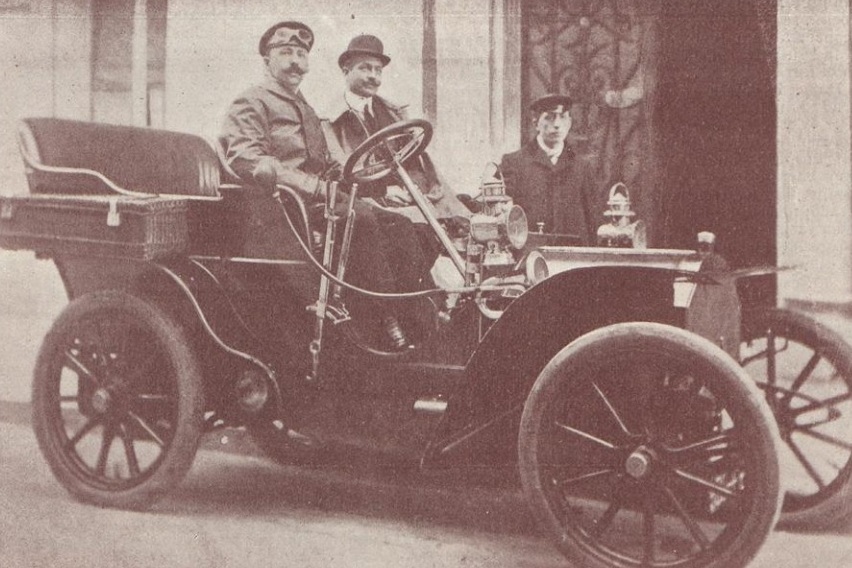
In Madrid, 1907

Having returned from the war Don Jaime set his headquarters in the prestigious Paris district of Passy. From there he embarked on numerous trips, which mark the years of 1905–1909; in the Spanish press they earned him the names of "eterno viajero" and "inevitable príncipe errante". Initially he shuttled across France, e.g. visiting the French Riviera or Chambord. In early 1906 Don Jaime travelled to Rome, reportedly admitted by the Pope. In the spring of 1906 he was in Spain for the first time since 1894; the journey commenced a series of at least 12 separate entries into the country. They usually took place in the spring or the summer, and for the autumn Don Jaime returned to Paris. The most frequently visited city was Barcelona, where he was noted in 1906, 1907, 1908 and 1909; he toured the vasco-navarrese region in 1906, 1907, and 1908. At least once, in 1907, he was in Madrid, but he was seen also in Avila, Zamora and even Lugo and Seville. The only distant journey was to Morocco.

As an ardent motorist Don Jaime normally moved in automobile, either his own or this of his closest companion, a Basque engineer and entrepreneur Martín Gaytan de Ayala y Aguirrebengoa; initially a former conservative deputy Esteban Ruiz Mantilla was also listed as his associate. He travelled low-profile and tried to maintain incognito; he did not give interviews and did not attend banquets or other official events. Information on his trips usually leaked to the press afterwards and was subject to endless speculations, confirmations and denials. Government officials used to dismiss the issue as irrelevant, though occasionally left-wing press agonized about a dangerous subversive who comes and goes "como Pedro por su casa". At times he was ridiculed with ironic couplets. When in Spain, Don Jaime dedicated most of his time to leisure: sightseeing, theatres, restaurants and bullfights, which he greatly enjoyed. However, he also used to meet local Carlist leaders. In most cases these were meetings in private, as Don Jaime was careful not to test the patience of the government. There were exceptions, though; in June 1908 he took part in large Carlist rallies in Somorrostro and Zumarraga; just in case, he returned to France the same day.

=== Politics ===
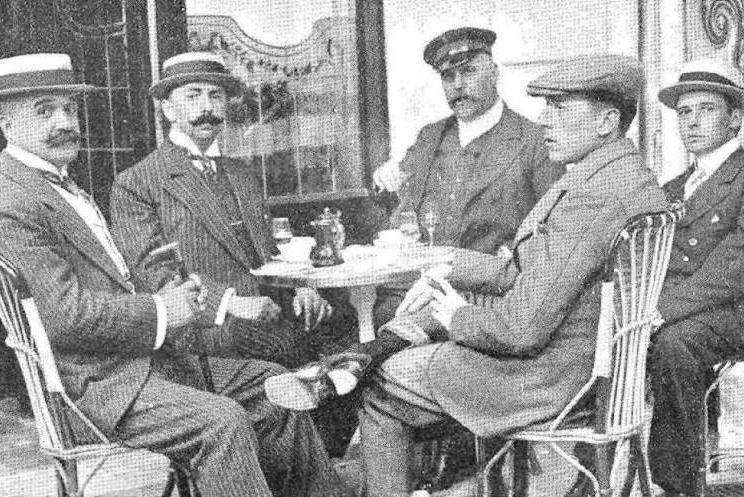
Don Jaime (2fL) with Tamarit (3fL) in Biarritz, 1908

In 1905-1909 Don Jaime did not openly engage in politics, though he was subject to ongoing controversy. Le Matin published an interview given back in Manchuria, in which he spoke favorably about the French republican government and its measures against religious orders; he declared himself a supporter of a Britain-modeled "monarquía republicana". Despite later open letter which toned down the statement his father got outraged and reportedly initially he refused to see him. In another interview, visibly moved after the Battle of Te-Li-Ssu carnage Don Jaime declared he would never accept such a price for ascending to the throne; this pacifist tone left numerous Carlists bewildered. Though he reportedly objected in Vatican to marriage of Alfonso XIII, he nevertheless wrote a personal letter which protested the anarchist attempt against the couple in 1906; he introduced himself as "adversario leal". There was constant gossip about his approaches towards the royal family. The press claimed he was closer to Conservatism than Traditionalism or even a Liberal, floated rumors about Don Jaime running in elections, appointed capitán general honorario or that he was prepared to recognize Alfonso XIII.

When in Spain Don Jaime used to meet regional Carlist leaders like Tirso de Olázabal, Juan Vázquez de Mella, Manuel Sivatte, Lorenzo Allier, Joaquín Llorens or Esteban Bilbao. In correspondence with the nationwide party leader Matías Barrio y Mier he limited himself to official acknowledgements of various initiatives and in public statements he stuck to ambiguous, general advice. In 1906 Don Jaime asked the former political leader Marqués de Cerralbo to come to Paris, and the two met in 1907; officially the infant intended to thank Cerralbo for his efforts, but given the party leadership was with Barrio, the encounter did not look standard. Very rarely Don Jaime spoke as authority; this was the case when he disowned one factious group, declared under the Integrist influence. Except the 1908 Zumarraga appearance he did not attend political rallies. In 1908 he gave another controversial interview. Don Jaime declared Carlism the party of order ready to support the government in works towards the glory of Spain, expressed support for Solidaridad Catalana and spoke in favor of Germany as the only genuine Spanish ally.

=== Family relations ===
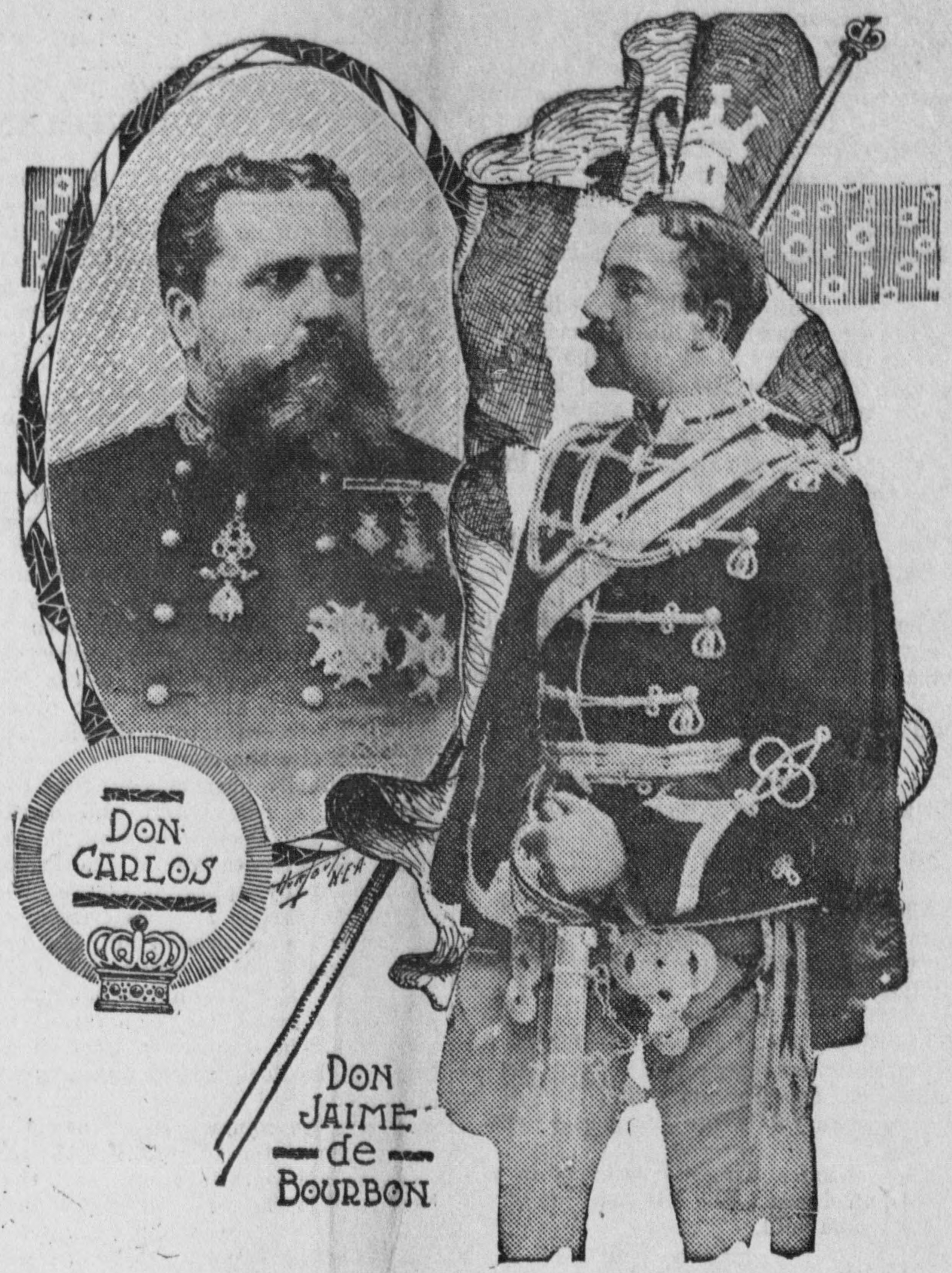
with father, propaganda collage, around 1905

Don Jaime's relations with his father deteriorated steadily since the latter married Berthe de Rohan; the step-mother and the step-son, with barely 2 years of age difference, developed venomous mutual hostility. Her presence in the Loredan Palace in Venice is quoted as one of key reasons why Don Jaime preferred to avoid the place; she retaliated by suggesting to Carlos VII that his son approached her. It is not clear when the father and the son have seen each other last; the ultimate opportunity mentioned by the press was the summer of 1905, when en route to Russia Don Jaime spent some time in Venice.

Relations between Carlos VII and Don Jaime dried out also due to other reasons. The former was furious having read the latter's interviews and his opinions, visibly deviating from the Traditionalist orthodoxy. Moreover, he was increasingly upset by growing independence of Don Jaime, who no longer consulted his father on own lifestyle. Carlos VII (in his late 50s) complained that his son (in his late 30s) did not seek his permission when embarking on foreign travel, especially to Spain, and that his visits there not only compromised the royal image, but might have fuelled internal squabbles within Carlism. Carlos VII claimed that he had explicitly banned Don Jaime from visiting Spain, but to no avail.

Don Jaime maintained fairly cordial relations with his paternal uncle and potential but unlikely successor as claimant, Don Alfonso Carlos; however, the latter thought him "jugador, especulador, vividor", sort of a playboy who lost part of his fortune on gambling; he was not surprised that no responsible woman of prestigious position was willing to marry him. Don Jaime remained on very good terms with his oldest sister and her husband and the Duque de Parma cousin. There is no information on family relations with Elvira and Alicia, two sisters who engaged in scandalous intimate relations. Also Don Jaime was not exempt from similar aura, e.g. in the spring of 1909 the press reported that when driving across northern Spain, he was "accompanied by two señoritas" – a fairly damning revelation at the time.

=== Re-inventing himself ===
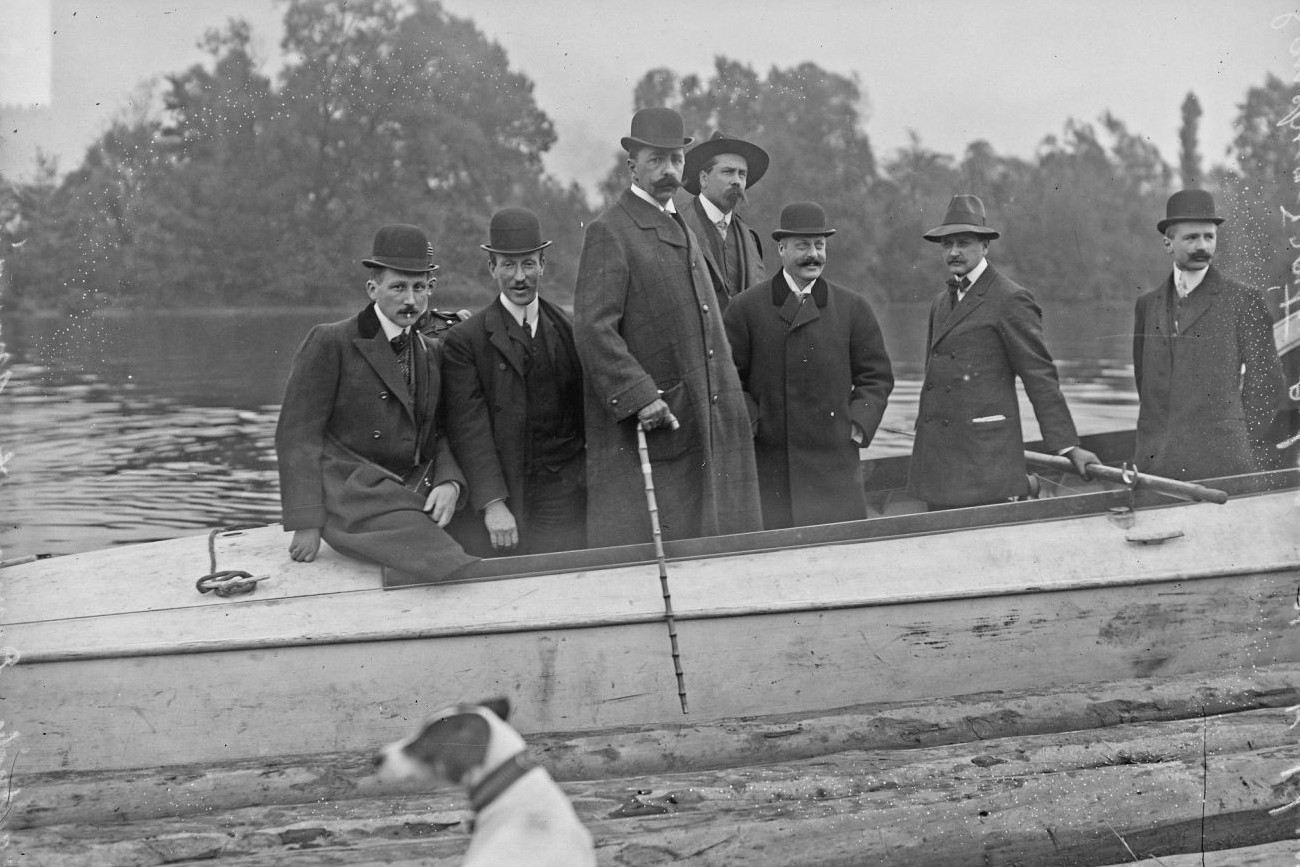
Don Jaime (middle, with cane) during seaplane attempt, Paris 1907

Approaching 40, a bachelor with no established personal record except erratic military career in foreign armies, Don Jaime was increasingly aware of his awkward position. It seems that he was at a loss as to the way forward. One option left to him was to proceed as an officer in the Russian army. It was initially reported that he was released from Russo-Japanese war on a 4-month-leave; indeed in May 1905 he travelled to Russia but details are not clear, except that he soon returned to France. One year later, in the summer of 1906, Don Jaime again visited St. Petersburg; some thought he would be re-incorporated in his old Grodno regiment, but eventually the press reported he was released into reserve. In 1908 he was promoted to colonel, which prompted ridicule of "el coronel Borbonoff". He was rumored to become a Russian military official serving as military liaison officer in the French Casablanca; it is not clear how much substance there was. In later official galas Don Jaime appeared in the uniform of a Russian colonel.

Apart from politics and personal life, in the years of 1905-1909 Don Jaime tried his hand as a sponsor engaged in works on transportation technology on land, air and water. He remained a keen motorist, though as automobiles were getting increasingly popular, what used to be a challenging and dangerous sport was gradually becoming a usual travelling routine. However, he was also interested in aviation and supported seaplane engineering, getting personally involved in numerous innovative flying attempts. At the same time he invested in naval science; some press titles hailed him as an inventor and scientist, who took part in sporting events as a launch pad for an innovative maritime propulsion system, 2-3 times faster than what had been known up to date; he apparently invested significant amounts of money into the project. Nothing came out of these initiatives; he was eventually noted as the one who suggested new measures related to stray dogs. Though at times he was noted as engaged in charity, helping single Carlist exiles in France, he has never tried to mount a general scheme to assist Carlist ex-combatants who had fought for his father but suffered misery and depravation afterwards.

== Claimant to the Spanish and French thrones ==
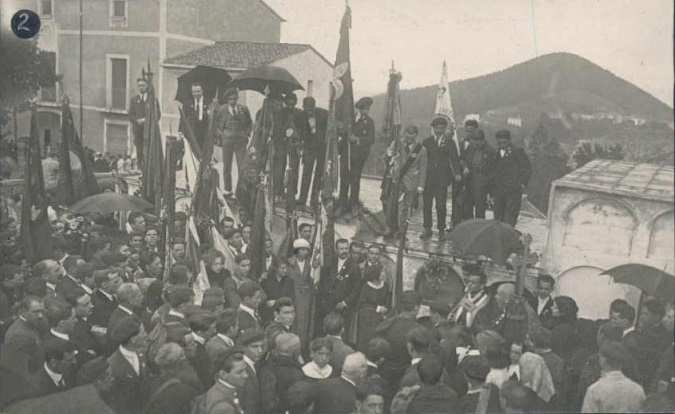
Jaimist gathering in Sant Fost de Campsentelles (1919)

On 18 July 1909 Jaime succeeded his father as Carlist pretender to the throne of Spain and likewise inherited the Legitimist claim to the throne of France. As Carlist pretender to Spain he was known as Jaime III, but used the style Duke of Madrid. As holder Legitimist claim to France by so-called Blancs d'Espagne he was considered to be Jacques I, but often referred to as Duke of Anjou.

Jaime retired from the Russian army and henceforward lived mostly at Schloss Frohsdorf in Lanzenkirchen in Austria and at his apartment on Avenue Hoche in Paris. He visited Spain incognito on a number of occasions. He also owned the Villa dei Borbone at Tenuta Reale near Viareggio in Italy which he had inherited from his mother.

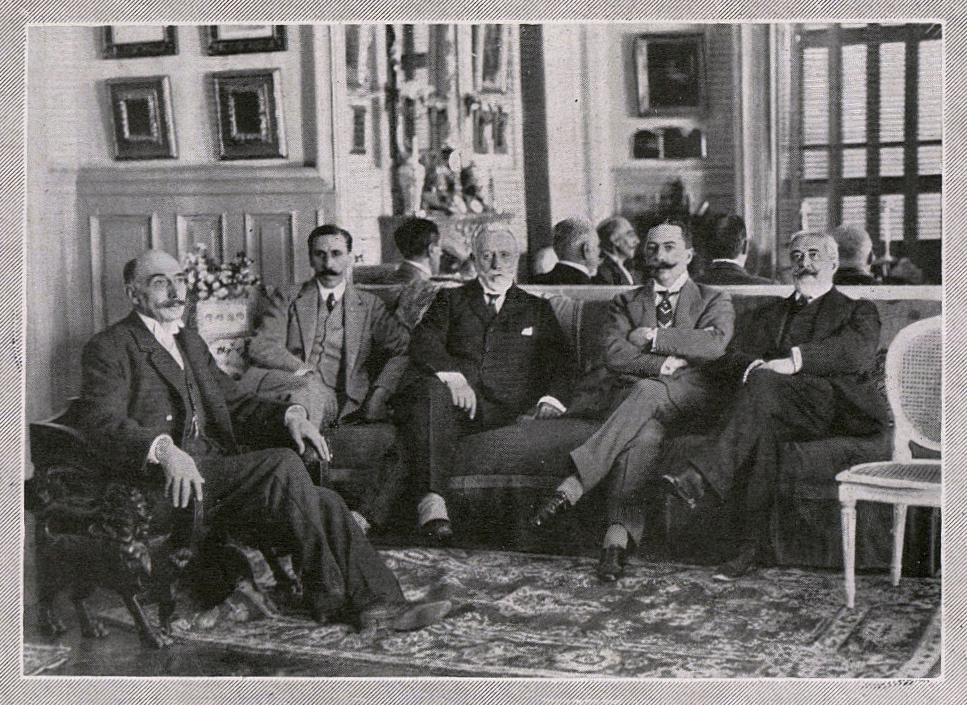
Jaime de Bourbon in Saint-Jean-de-Luz, home of Carlist politician Tirso de Olazábal (at center)

For part of World War I Jaime lived under house-arrest at Schloss Frohsdorf in Austria.

On 16 April 1923, by a decree to his Delegate-General in Spain, the Marques de Villores, Jaime created the Order of Prohibited Legitimacy (Orden de la Legitimidad Proscrita) to honour those who suffered imprisonment in Spain or were exiled for their loyalty to the Carlist cause.

In April 1931 the constitutional king of Spain Alfonso XIII was forced to leave the country and the Second Spanish Republic was proclaimed. Jaime issued a manifesto calling upon all monarchists to rally to the legitimist cause. Several months later, on 23 September, Jaime received Alfonso at his apartment in Paris. Two days later Alfonso and his wife Ena received Jaime at the Hotel Savoy d'Avon near Fontainebleau. Jaime conferred the collar of the Order of the Holy Spirit upon Alfonso. These meetings marked a certain rapprochement between the two claimants to the Spanish throne. According to some authors – contested by the others – the two signed or verbally agreed an arrangement named Pact of Territet which would terminate the Alfonsist-Carlist discord.

A week after his meetings with Alfonso, Jaime died in Paris. He was buried at the Villa dei Borbone at Tenuta Reale. He was succeeded in his Spanish and French claims by his uncle Alfonso Carlos, Duke of Anjou and San Jaime.

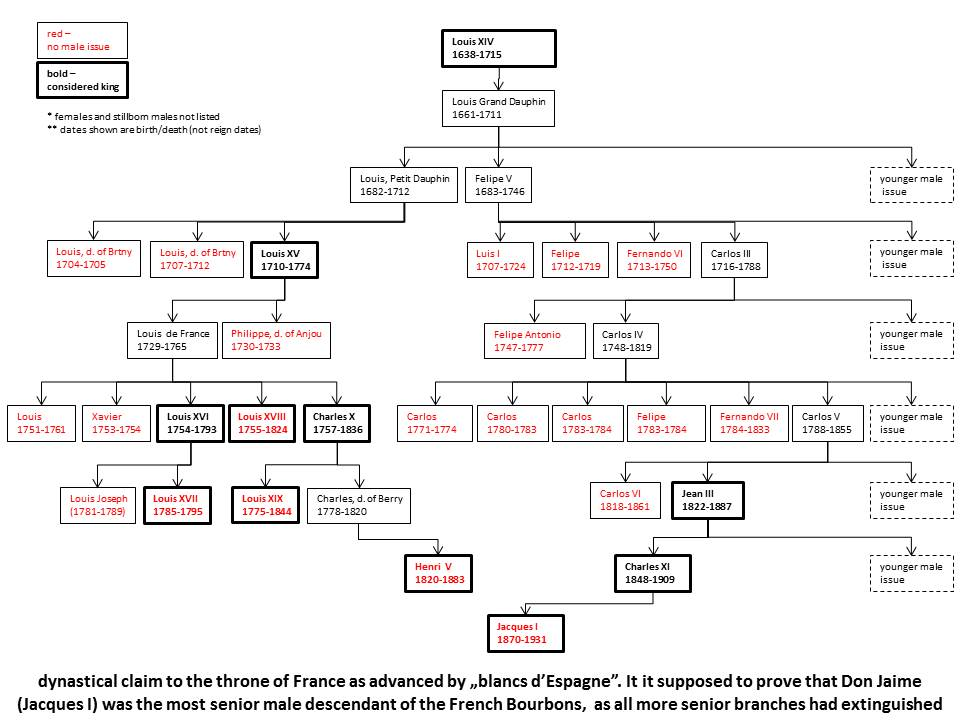

== Ancestry ==
Ancestors of Prince Jaime, Duke of Anjou and Madrid

8. Infante Carlos María Isidro of Spain
4. Prince Juan, Count of Montizón
9. Princess Maria Francisca of Portugal
2. Carlos, Duke of Madrid
10. Francis IV, Duke of Modena
5. Archduchess Maria Beatrix of Austria-Este
11. Princess Maria Beatrice of Savoy
1. Jaime, Duke of Madrid
12. Charles II, Duke of Parma
6. Charles III, Duke of Parma
13. Princess Maria Teresa of Savoy
3. Princess Margherita of Bourbon-Parma
14. Charles Ferdinand, Duke of Berry
7. Princess Louise d'Artois
15. Princess Caroline Ferdinande of Bourbon-Two Sicilies

== Notes ==
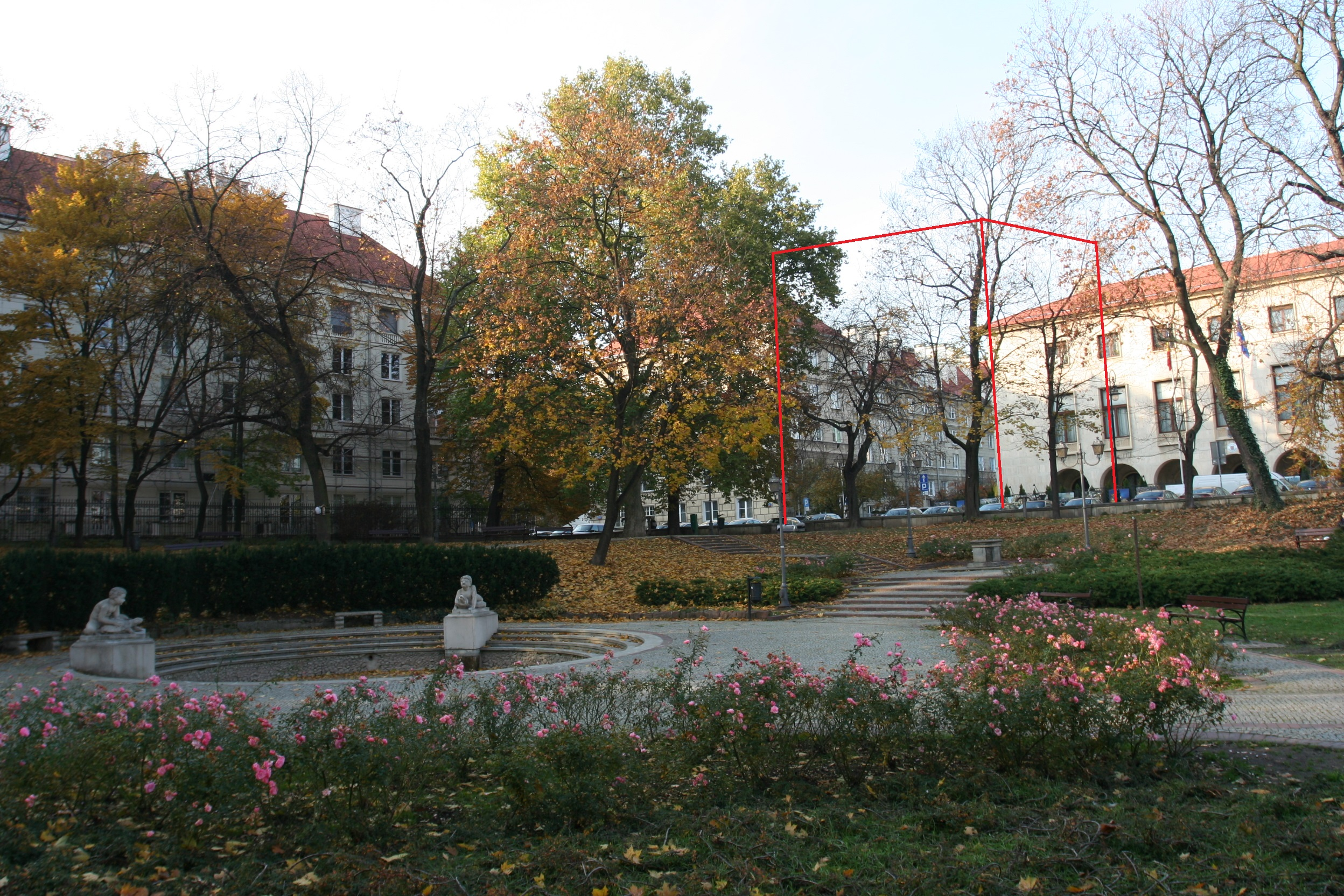
Warsaw, Chopina 8 today

== Bibliography ==
- Alcalá, César, Jaime de Borbón. El último rey romántico, Madrid 2011, ISBN 9788461475117
- "Don Jaime is Dead: Carlist Pretender". The New York Times (3 October 1931): 11.
- "The Duke of Madrid, Soldier and Traveller". The Times (5 October 1931): 19.
- Елец, Юлий Лукьянович, История Лейб-Гвардии Гродненского Гусарского полка, New York 2015, ISBN 9785519406048
- Andrés Martín, Juan Ramón de, El cisma mellista: historia de una ambición política. Madrid: Actas Editorial, 2000, ISBN 9788487863820
- Melgar del Rey, Francisco Melgar de, Don Jaime, el príncipe caballero. Madrid: Espasa-Calpe, 1932. OCLC 6388350
- Melgar del Rey, Francisco Melgar de, El noble final de la escisión dinástica. Madrid: Consejo Privado de S.A.R. el Conde de Barcelona, 1964.

Prince Jaime, Duke of Anjou and Madrid House of Bourbon Cadet branch of the House of Capetian Born: 27 June 1870 Died: 2 October 1931
French nobility
Vacant Title last held by Louis Stanislas	Duke of Anjou; 1883 – 2 October 1931	Succeeded by Prince Alfonso Carlos, Duke of Anjou and San Jaime
Spanish nobility
Preceded by Prince Carlos, Duke of Madrid	Duke of Madrid; 18 July 1909 – 2 October 1931	Vacant Title next held by Prince Alfonso Carlos, Duke of Anjou and San Jaime as Duke of San Jaime
Titles in pretence
Preceded by Prince Carlos, Duke of Madrid	— TITULAR — King of Spain; Carlist pretender 18 July 1909 – 2 October 1931	Succeeded by Prince Alfonso Carlos, Duke of Anjou and San Jaime
Preceded by Prince Carlos, Duke of Madrid	— TITULAR — King of France; Legitimist succession 18 July 1909 – 2 October 1931	Succeeded by Prince Alfonso Carlos, Duke of Anjou and San Jaime
Preceded by Prince Carlos, Duke of Madrid	— TITULAR — Dauphin of France; Legitimist succession 21 November 1887 – 18 July 1909	Vacant Title next held by Alfonso, Prince of Asturias
