= Prince Alfonso Carlos, Duke of Anjou and San Jaime =

Carlist pretender to the Spanish throne (1849–1936)

Alfonso Carlos
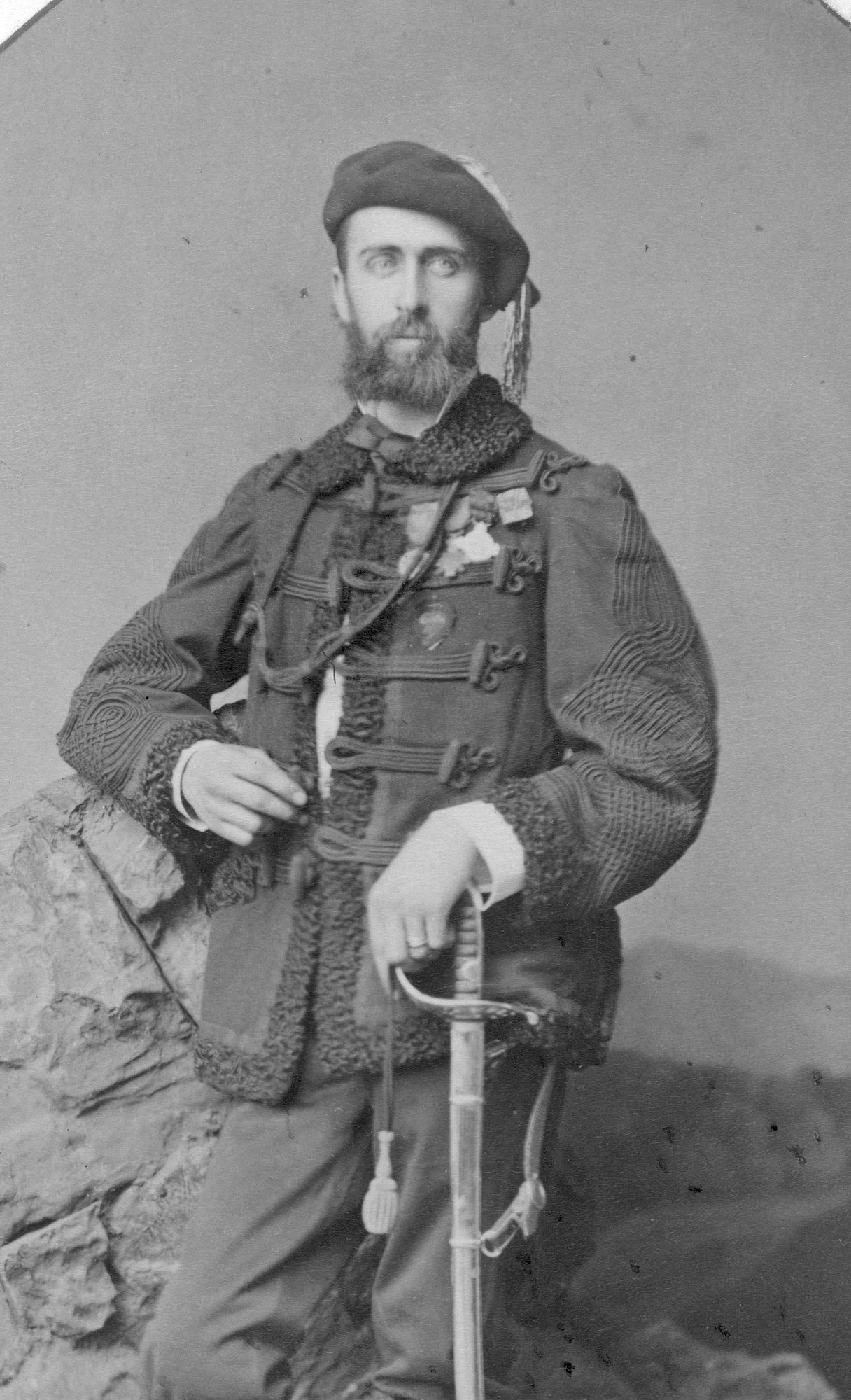
- Alfonso Carlos in 1877

Carlist pretender to the Spanish throne and Legitimist claimant to the French throne
- Pretence: 2 October 1931 – 29 September 1936
- Predecessor: Jaime, Duke of Anjou and Madrid
- Successor: Carlist pretender: Disputed; Legitimist claimant: Alfonso XIII
- Born: 12 September 1849; London, England
- Died: 29 September 1936 (aged 87); Vienna, Austria
- Burial: Puchheim Castle
- Spouse: Infanta Maria das Neves of Portugal (m. 1871)
- House: Bourbon
- Father: Prince Juan, Count of Montizón
- Mother: Maria Beatrix of Austria-Este

Alfonso Carlos de Borbón (12 September 1849 – 29 September 1936) was the Carlist claimant to the throne of Spain under the name Alfonso Carlos I; some French Legitimists declared him also the king of France as Charles XII, though Alfonso never officially endorsed these claims.

In 1870 and in the ranks of the papal troops, he defended Rome against the Italian Army. In 1872–1874, he commanded sections of the front during the Third Carlist War. Between the mid-1870s and the early 1930s, he remained withdrawn into privacy, living in his residences in Austria. His public engagements were related to the buildup of an international league against dueling.

Upon the unexpected death of his nephew Prince Jaime, Duke of Anjou and Madrid in 1931, he inherited the Spanish and French monarchical claims. As an octagenarian, he dedicated himself to development of Carlist structures in Spain. He led the movement into the anti-Republican conspiracy, which resulted in Carlist participation in the July coup d'état. As he had no children, Alfonso Carlos was the last undisputable Carlist pretender to the throne; after his death, the movement was fragmented into branches supporting various candidates.

== Family and youth ==
The Countess of Montizon with her sons Carlos and Alfonso Carlos (baby) around 1850.

Alfonso was a descendant of the royal Spanish Borbón family; his great-grandfather was the king of Spain, Carlos IV. Alfonso's grandfather Carlos María Isidro was engaged in dynastical feud with his brother over inheritance, though the conflict overlapped with major social and political cleavages. The 1833–1840 civil war which ensued produced defeat of Carlos María, who claimed the throne as Carlos V, and of his traditionalist and anti-liberal followers, named Carlists. The claimant went on exile and abdicated in 1845 in favor of his oldest son. His younger son and the father of Alfonso, Prince Juan, Count of Montizón (1822–1887), was at the time serving in the army of a relative, King of Sardinia. In 1847 he married Maria Beatrix of Austria-Este, sister to the ruling Duke of Modena, Francisco V; in 1848–1849 the couple had two sons, Alfonso born as the younger one. However, increasingly liberal outlook of Juan produced acute conflict with his religious wife and his brother-in-law, Francisco V. The couple agreed to separate; Juan left for England, while Maria Beatriz with their 2 sons remained in Modena.

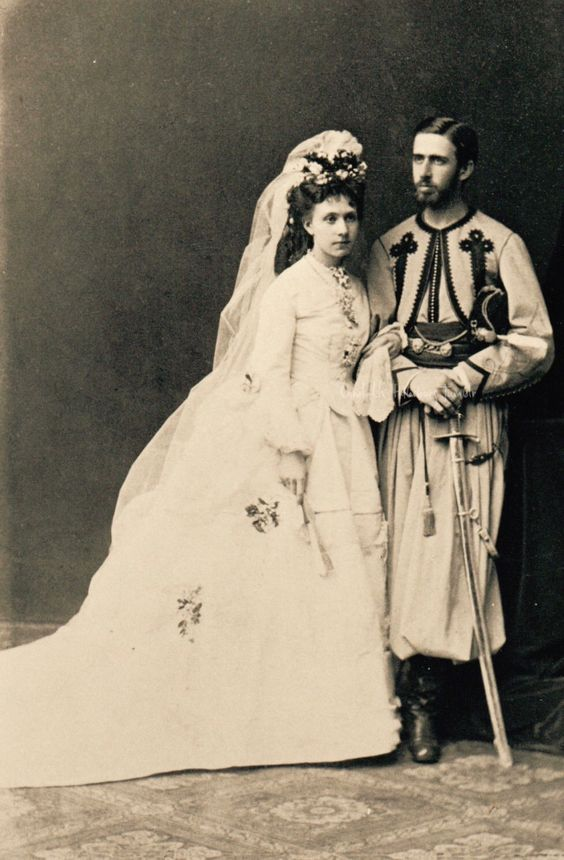
Wedding photograph

In the 1850s Alfonso spent his early childhood with his mother and older brother in the Duchy of Modena; it is there he received his early homeschooling. Due to the revolutionary turmoil of 1859 the family left for Austria, hosted by the ex-emperor, Ferdinand I; they settled in Prague, which remained their key residence until 1864. Their attempt to settle in Venice, resulting from health concerns, was aborted due to the Italo-Austrian war; they spent the years of 1864–1867 shuttling between Innsbruck, Vienna and Graz. Both teenagers were raised in very pious ambience; their religious mother and equally devout but more strong-willed step-grandmother, María Teresa de Braganza, made sure the boys received a profoundly Catholic, Carlist and anti-liberal education. In 1868 Alfonso embarked on a long pilgrimage to Palestine; the same year his 21-year-old brother Carlos assumed the Carlist claim to the throne of Spain. When back in Europe Alfonso decided to join Papal Zouaves.

When on leave from the papal service, in the late 1860s Alfonso met the teenage infanta María das Neves of Braganza (1852–1941). She was the oldest child of deposed king of Portugal Miguel I, who lost the throne in 1834; on exile Miguel wed princess Adelaide of Löwenstein-Wertheim-Rosenberg, descendant of highly aristocratic German family. Alfonso and María married in 1871 in the bride's family estate at Kleinheubach. The bride and the groom were related, as María's paternal grandmother Carlota Joaquina was sister to Alfonso's paternal grandfather; they obtained the papal dispensation first. The couple turned out to be caring and loving partners; their marriage lasted 65 years. However, they had no descendants. Some sources claim their only child was born in 1874 but died shortly afterwards, others maintain they had no children at all.

== Military episode (1870–1874) ==
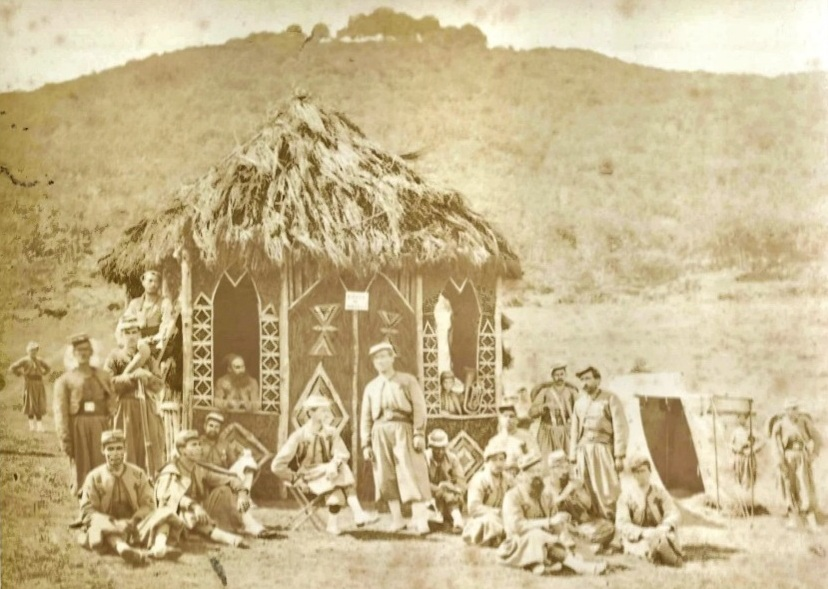
Alfonso Carlos (centre, sitting on a chair) with Papal Zouaves

Since enlisting into the Zouavaes during almost 2 years Alfonso Carlos was taking part in trainings, maneuvers and other peacetime service of papal army. When Italian troops assaulted Rome he served as alférez in the 6. Company of the 2. Battalion. It was deployed along Aurelian Walls and concentrated around Porta Pia, on key axis of Italian assault. The fighting took place on 20 September 1870. For a few hours and heavily outnumbered, the Zouaves resisted onslaught of the bersaglieri shock units; some authors refer to the "famous last stand". The papal order to give up was not accepted unanimously and some detachments kept fighting until all units surrendered later that day. Alfonso was neither recognized nor revealed his identity and for 3 days with other POWs he was kept imprisoned; they were then shipped to Toulon and released. He transferred to Graz and got married the following year.

In early 1872 Carlos VII was gearing up for a military rising against the monarchy of Amadeo I. He recalled his brother to southern France and in April nominated him commander of Carlist troops, supposed to operate in Catalonia. While fighting continued Alfonso resided mostly in Perpignan. He focused on logistics and labored to obtain financing; he also made personal military appointments and issued general orders. In late December he crossed into Spain and in February joined the troops led by Francisco Savalls. During the next half a year Alfonso shuttled between small villages in the Girona and Barcelona provinces. It is not clear what was his personal contribution to minor successes in the area; he is better known for organizing events intended to raise spirits. During the summer he developed acute conflict with Savalls; in October 1873 via France Alfonso moved to Navarre to discuss problems in command chain with his brother. Outcome of the talks was inconclusive and until spring of 1874 Alfonso remained in Perpignan.

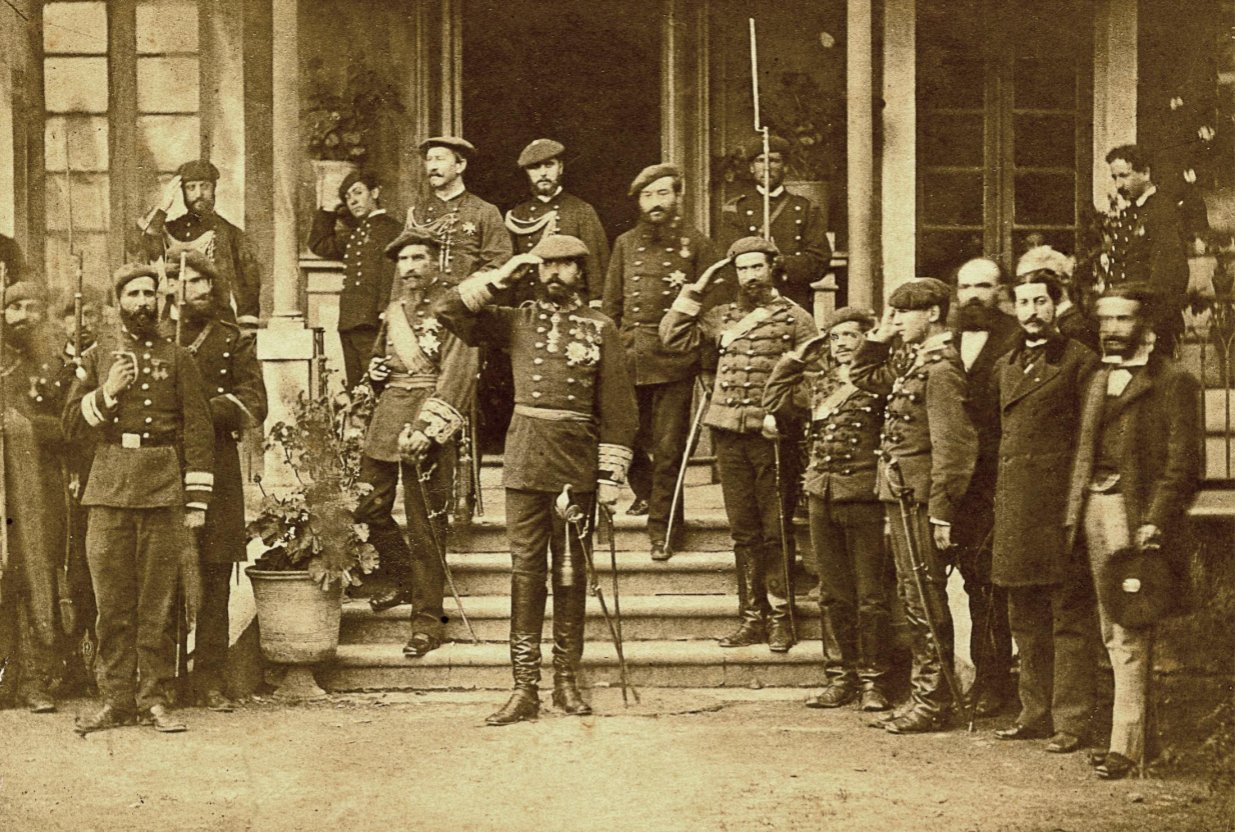
Carlos VII and his staff, around 1874

In April Alfonso returned to Catalonia and set headquarters in Prats de Llusanés. One source claims he turned Carlist structures into a well-lubricated machinery and moved south to consolidate the insurgent rule there. In May he crossed the Ebro and commanded during fighting near Gandesa; in June he turned towards the Maestrazgo and southern Aragón. In July 1874 Alfonso headed the failed siege of Teruel, and later that month he ordered operation against Cuenca. The assault produced one of the largest Carlist triumphs; as one of only 2 provincial capitals, Cuenca was seized by the insurgents. However, victorious troops plundered the city and "Saco de Cuenca" became one of the most notorious cases of Carlist violence. In August 1874 Carlos VII transferred Alfonso to command of the newly created Ejército del Centro; Alfonso protested the decision and resigned. During September and October he remained relatively inactive. With headquarters in Chelva and then Alcora, he issued last orders to organize a raid towards Murcia. With his brother's acceptance in November 1874 Alfonso crossed to France and withdrew into privacy.

== Financial status ==
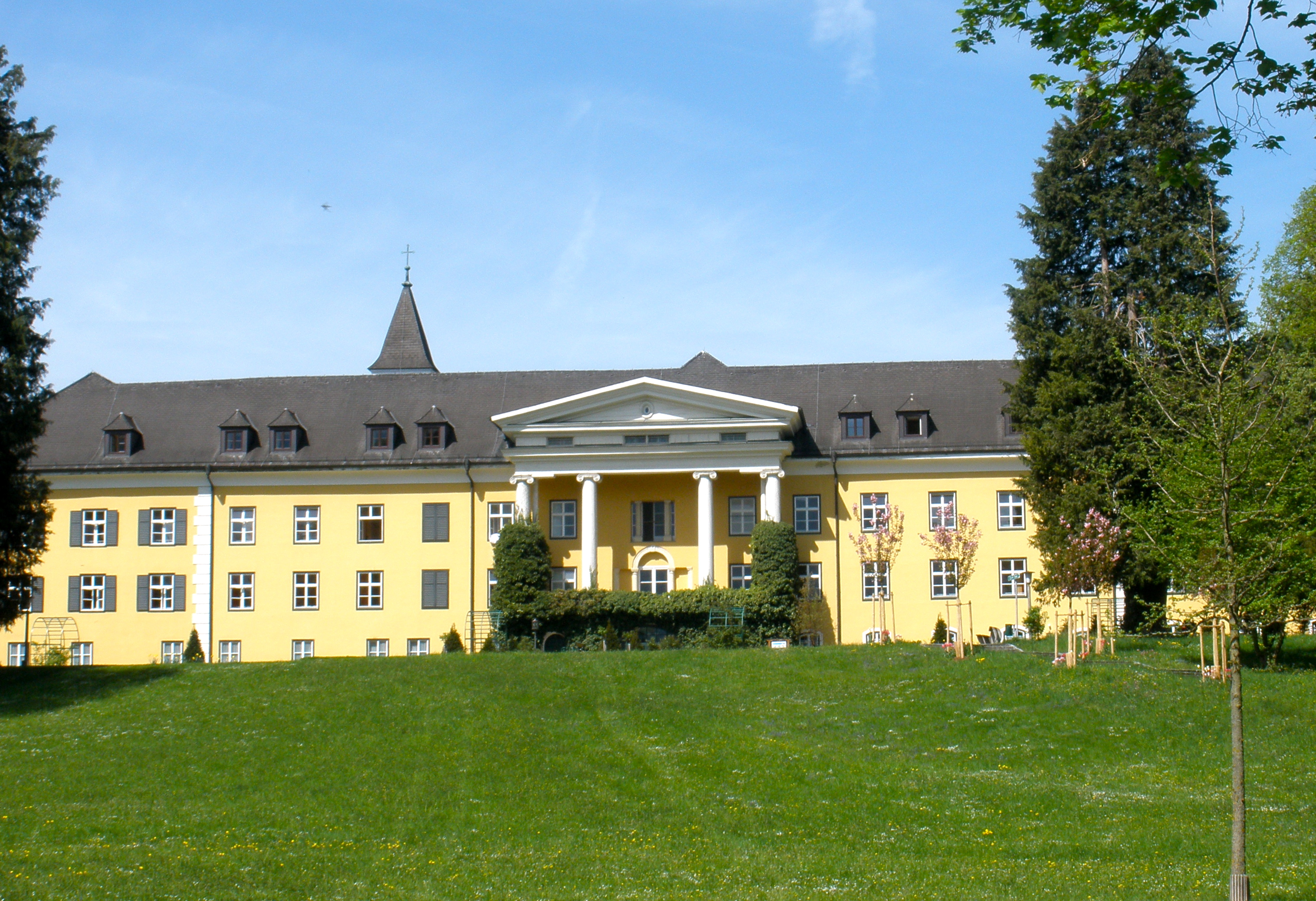
Ebenzweier residence

Along paternal line Alfonso inherited little wealth. His father, descendant to exiled branch of Spanish royals, abandoned the family; as a commoner he resided in England and lived off a pension, paid by relatives of his estranged wife. Alfonso's mother initially shared the family Austria-Este wealth in the Duchy of Modena. Once her brother lost the throne the branch lived on exile in Austria and their properties were divided among many members.

Alfonso married into wealth of the Braganza family, also exiled from Portugal but possessing numerous estates in Bavaria, Austria and elsewhere. According to a not necessarily trustworthy source, the childless Francisco V intended to make Alfonso his legal heir; the condition was that Alfonso adopts the Austria-Este name, which he refused. As a result of numerous divisions of assets within the Borbón/Austria Este and Braganza/Löwenstein-Wertheim families, Alfonso and his wife ended up as owners of 4 estates, all located in the imperial Austria: a multi-storey residential building at Theresianumgasse in Vienna, the palace in Puchheim, the palace in Ebenzweier and numerous smaller urban estates in Graz.

Until 1914 the couple remained in an excellent financial position. Their source of income was mostly profits generated by rural economy related to the Ebenzweier and Puchheim estates, e.g. the former comprised some 1,000 hectares of forests alone. Their rural possessions were exempted from fiscal and other obligations, as they enjoyed extraterritorial status, granted by the ruling Habsburg branch to own relatives. The rural profits were generated by usual large-scale agricultural businesses, including production and sales of dairies, horticultural products, grain, cattle and even flowers. Other income was produced by rental of premises in Vienna and Graz and by various securities; some of them were issued by institutions operating abroad, e.g. in Russia. In the 1910s and on suggestion of a trusted Spanish adviser, most of these papers were deposed in Swiss banks.

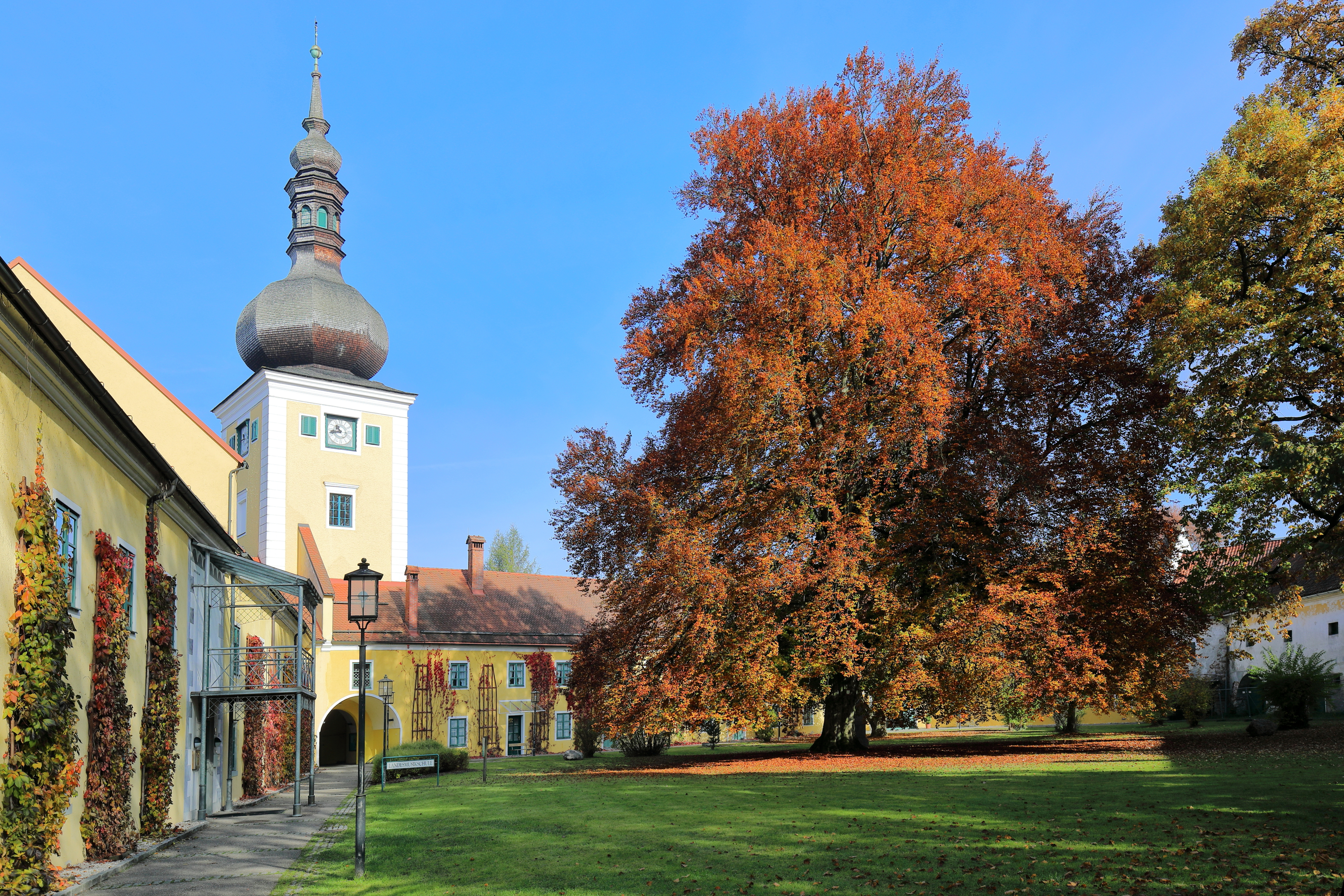
Puchheim residence

In the Republican Austria the couple suffered financial problems, especially in the early 1920s; they were the result of new social and fiscal regulations, inflation and loss of extraterritoriality. Thanks to efforts of the Madrid diplomacy the privileged status was restored to some estates and Ebenzweier was leased to the Spanish embassy, yet they were still threatened by expropriation. Due to labor legislation the rural economy was barely making any profit, rental became commercially difficult and securities, located abroad, were hardly accessible. Facing total financial breakdown the couple accepted measures like cutting down park trees for timber, regular sales of plots and Graz estates, and even sales of personal belongings like jewelry and art. During a few years they refrained from purchase of new clothing; in Vienna they always travelled on foot and during train journeys they regularly took 3rd class. They reduced personal staff to 3 servants and at time suffered cold due to economizing on heating. In the early 1930s their status improved slightly; political changes in Austria produced less restrictive policy, and as king Alfonso was aided financially by the Carlist organization in Spain.

== Lifestyle ==
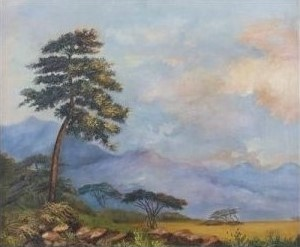
Meseta africana by Alfonso Carlos

Both very religious, Alfonso and María made a loving couple; throughout all of their 65-year marriage they stayed close one to another. Unlike his older brother, Alfonso never took part as involved in extra-marital episodes. The couple were only moderately attracted by glitz of the imperial capital; for political reasons they did not have access to official gatherings organized by the Habsburg court. Alfonso used to spend his days behind the desk doing business correspondence. Periodically he was assisted by personal secretary, yet he complained of not having one who could do business in German. In the interwar period he corresponded heavily with Marqués de Vesolla, who turned his principal financial advisor and trustee. In their free time the couple enjoyed long walks; even in their 80s they walked for 2–3 hours, and in Vienna their preferred spot was the Belvederegarten. When younger Alfonso was fond of riding a bicycle; he also tried his hand in painting. Both enjoyed bullfighting and when in America or Spain they always tried to attend a corrida.

Until 1914 the couple led a luxurious life, shuttling between their estates depending upon season and other circumstances. In each residence they maintained dedicated staff, and when travelling they were accompanied by servants and carried with them numerous belongings, including horses. Since they found winters in Austria severe, around December every year the couple used to depart for warmer regions and returned around April; prior to World War I Alfonso and his wife during 45 successive years travelled to Italy, other Mediterranean (including Spain, where they travelled incognito) and embarked on longer journeys to America, Africa and the Middle East. Their luggage could have amounted to 95 pieces and 4 tons. Due to financial difficulties the couple ceased travelling after World War One; later they resumed winter journeys, though not to exotic places any more. They travelled incognito and lived very modestly. Since inheriting the Carlist claim in 1931 Alfonso and María used to spend long spells in southern France, next to the Spanish frontier.

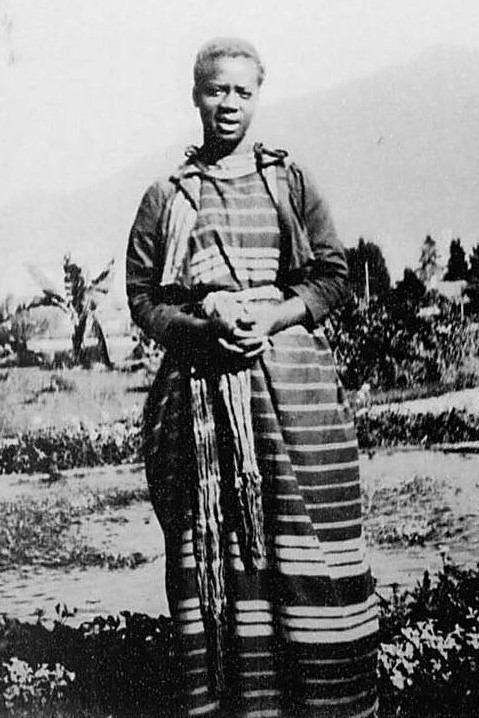
Mabrouka

If paying visits or being visited, they usually limited themselves to close family. At times they met other relatives, like nephews and nieces. Until 1906 they frequently visited Alfonso's mother, the nun in Graz. In the 20th century they maintained closer links with Alfonso's nephew and the Carlist claimant, Don Jaime; owner of the Frohsdorf palace near Vienna, he used to visit his uncles en route to and from Paris. Their mutual relation was cordial, but Alfonso considered Don Jaime somewhat of a playboy. Despite political and dynastical conflict the couple maintained very correct correspondence with Alfonso XIII, especially that Spanish diplomacy provided them with enormous help after 1918. They reserved enmity only for Berthe, widowed by Alfonso's brother; they thought her an immoral profligate who lived off selling illegally seized belongings. Until the late 1920s they were also lukewarm towards some members of the Borbón-Parma family. From one of their Africa journeys Alfonso and María brought a black girl named Mabrouka; over time she assumed a role in-between a servant and a family member. From 1909 onwards Alfonso kept paying a pension to his English half-siblings.

== General political views ==
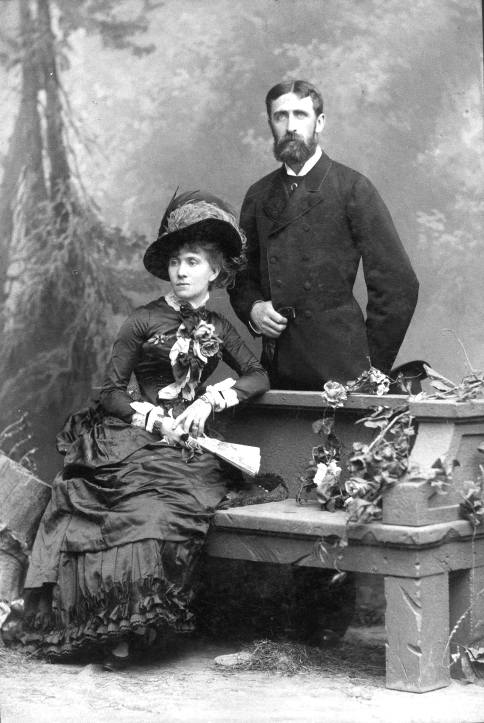
The couple in the 1890s

Alfonso considered himself above all a Spaniard and identified with Spain as "my country"; he believed in the Spanish mission in America, where highly spirited Hispanidad was to oppose the mean Anglo-Saxon culture. During incognito journeys to Spain in the 1920s he felt "like in heaven" and cheered gentle, serene, helpful Spaniards. Until 1918 he also felt emotionally highly attached to Austria and wholeheartedly supported the Central Powers during the First World War. However, after the overthrow of the monarchy the sympathy for his host country evaporated, mostly due to the social legislation adopted; he referred to Austria as to his prison. What did not change was Alfonso's Francophobia. Both in great politics and in unfortunate family events he kept tracing treacherous and sinister influence of Paris, controlled by masonic and republican crooks, and lamented apparent French influence over Spain.

Though liberal Spanish press at times named Alfonso "the butcher of Cuenca", referring to his command of Carlist troops which plundered Cuenca following seizure of the city during the Third Carlist War, later on he demonstrated an anti-war and peaceful stance. During the Spanish–American conflict he declared in private that Spain should have abandoned Philippines and Cuba 3 years earlier. He was irritated by what he perceived as hyper-patriotic frenzy of the Spanish press, praised the Madrid government for concluding the peace treaty and claimed it had prevented loss of Canary Islands and Balearic Islands. During the First World War the couple ran a mini-hospital in their Vienna house, and catered personally to wounded soldiers. He deplored revolutionary violence in Russia and elsewhere. When assuming the Carlist claim he confessed that civil war was an unacceptable means of politics. However, he was best known as partisan of the anti-duel movement. In a few countries Alfonso Carlos co-founded and animated leagues against dueling, in some cases he ensured royal patronage, wrote a book which advanced the cause and published a few related articles.

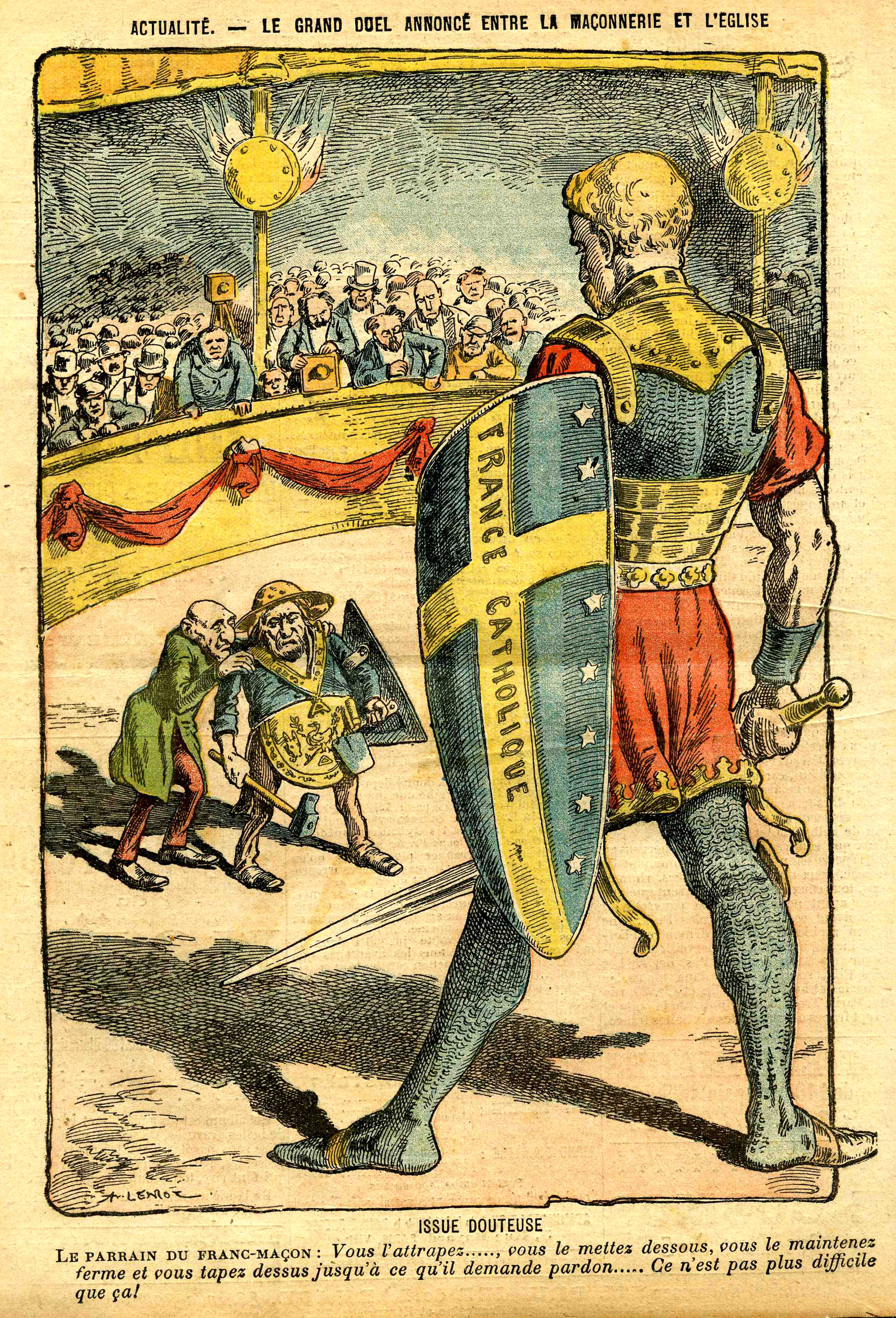
Catholicism v Masonry

As descendant and heir to deposed rulers he abhorred liberal regimes set up in the second half of the 19th century in Europe. The Soviet revolution remained his constant negative reference point, standing for iconic breakdown of civilization. However, also social-democratic legislation of republican Austria gained his furious criticism, with successive Austrian authorities referred to as "communist" and "bolsheviks" ruling over "the country of thieves who have respect neither for law nor for justice nor for property"; even the Christian-democratic president Miklas was dubbed as "red". He welcomed the Primo dictatorship and later lamented decline of political order in Spain of 1930. He predicted the country would turn a republic within 2 years; when the Alfonsine monarchy indeed fell he viewed the newly set up Second Spanish Republic as a stepping stone towards anarchy and communism. Alfonso viewed the Dollfuss regime in Austria as a step forward, yet his views on the Fascist regime in Italy and the Nazi rule in Germany remain unclear.

== Carlist engagements, 1875–1930 ==
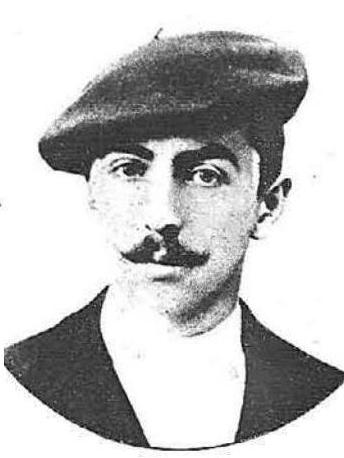
Don Jaime, 1890s

According to the Carlist dynastical doctrine, upon birth Alfonso was the third in line of succession to the throne. In 1861–1868, he was the second, and in 1868–1870 the first to inherit the claim. Since 1870 he was relegated to the second position, as upon future death of his older brother the claim was supposed to pass to his newly born son and Alfonso's nephew, later known as Don Jaime. When this indeed happened in 1909 Alfonso became again the first in line of succession, but very few looked upon him as a future Carlist king. Though over decades Don Jaime moved from youth to mid-age childless and was aging unmarried, until the late 1920s it was still theoretically possible he would have a legitimate son. Even in case he would not, Alfonso could not have reasonably expected to inherit the claim, as it seemed unlikely that he would outlive his 21-year-junior nephew. Hence, for over half a century within mainstream Carlism Alfonso was viewed as a collateral member of the royal family who gallantly contributed to the cause in the early 1870s, but who would not play any role in the future.

The dissenting factions tended to look towards Alfonso as to a would-be dynastical counter-proposal to either his brother or his nephew almost every time when Carlism suffered from internal crisis. In the mid-1880s supporters of Ramón Nocedal challenged Carlos VII and some nurtured hopes that Alfonso would become their leader; also some French legitimists, following death of Conde de Chambord, considered Alfonso and not his father the next French king. In the late 1890s a faction pressing violent action against the Spanish monarchy faced caution and skepticism on part of the claimant; again, their speculations tended to focus on Alfonso. In the mid- and late 1910s followers of Juan Vázquez de Mella decidedly favored Germany during the Great War; as Don Jaime sympathized with the Entente and Alfonso supported the Central Powers, the latter again became subject of dynastical speculations.

Carlist standard

Alfonso never revealed the slightest tone of disloyalty to his ruling relatives and never tried to supersede them or to build his own following in the party. Though he proudly admitted his Carlist identity he remained somewhat detached from the movement, and participated neither in behind-the-scenes meetings forging the Carlist policy nor in large Carlist gatherings held abroad; this stand earned him some criticism and few called him "santo imbécil". He maintained private correspondence with some Carlist personalities in Spain, at times discussed political developments and expressed his own opinions, but there is no evidence he has tried to enforce his views or mount any political schemes. His correspondence neither reveals any speculations or maneuvers related to his future theoretical claim. In the 1920s he started making provisions for his own death and in 1930 he was positive that his nephew remained in good health, with years and maybe decades of "rule" ahead of him.

== French claim ==
Following the unexpected death of his nephew, in October 1931 Alfonso inherited the legitimist claim to the French throne. He has never officially voiced in the French case; he neither endorsed claims by Blancs d'Espagne nor distanced himself from them. The branch related to Prince Sixtus of Bourbon-Parma declared him "Charles XII", while the followers of Paul Watrin opted rather for "Alphonse I". Between 1931 and 1936 Alfonso spent at least 4 winters in the south of France, but he avoided public engagements; the best known was a religious event in Mondonville, highly saturated with legitimist flavor.

== Spanish claim ==
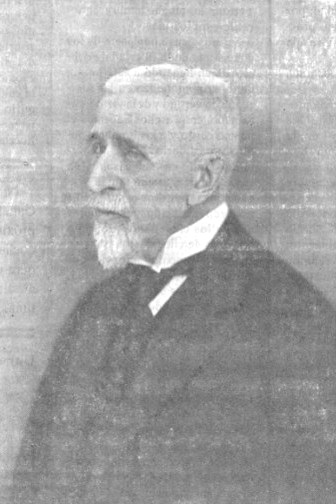
Alfonso Carlos, 1930s

With death of Don Jaime in October 1931 Alfonso inherited the Carlist claim to the Spanish throne. He accepted it, though he privately confessed that the decision came as the "largest sacrifice of my life" and that Traditionalist crown was a "crown of thorns". In order not to burn the bridges with the Alfonsists he rejected the royal name of "Alfonso XII"; in order not to alienate the Carlists he rejected also the name of "Alfonso XIV" and eventually settled for the royal name of "Alfonso Carlos I". Traditionally the Carlist claimants assumed also the title of Duque de Madrid. Because of Berthe de Rohan, widow after Carlos VII who still bore the title of Duquesa de Madrid, Alfonso Carlos eventually opted for the title of Duque de San Jaime. He confirmed en bloc all earlier personal party nominations of Don Jaime; however, in late 1931 for few months he settled in France to discuss things in detail.

Alfonso Carlos initially seemed ready to discuss an informal dynastic solution, tentatively agreed between Don Jaime and the deposed Alfonso XIII as so-called Pact of Territet. He met Alfonso in France and both issued warmly-worded manifestos, though with little substance. This triggered anxiety among the Carlist branch known as the cruzadistas; during the meeting with Alfonso Carlos in mid-1932 they seemed to have arrived at some understanding, but as the cruzadistas became intransigent, he expelled them from the party. In 1933–1934 Alfonso Carlos grew clearly disinclined toward a dynastic agreement; in 1934 he also dismissed potential claim of his grandnephew Karl Pius. In 1935 Alfonso Carlos welcomed Don Alfonso in Puchheim, but they focused on family issues. After final hesitation in April 1936 Alfonso Carlos made public his decision; following his death prince Xavier would become a regent, who as soon as possible and following consultation with a grand Carlist assembly would decide upon the next king.

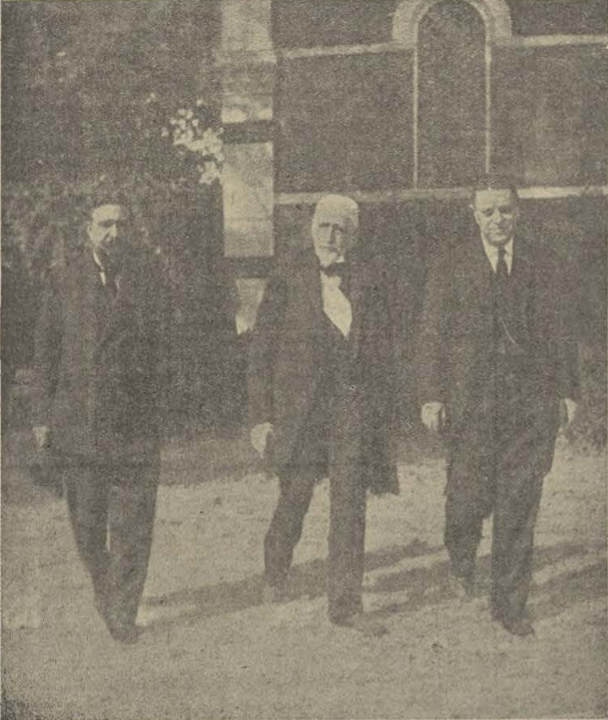
With de Villores

Another paramount issue Alfonso Carlos had to deal with was the Carlist stand towards the Spanish Republic. He despised the regime as a first step towards bolshevism, yet it is not clear to what extent he shaped Carlist daily politics of 1931–1936. He presided over re-unification of Traditionalism; some claim that as personally he was leaning towards Integrism, former Integrists became overrepresented in command. Some claim that already in 1932 he engaged in plans for a "combined monarchist rising", which have eventually fizzled out. Following death of the party jefé Marqués de Villores in 1932 he appointed a moderate successor, Conde Rodezno, and with little enthusiasm authorized his tactics of entering into ongoing political parliamentary co-operation with Alfonsists in the National Bloc. However, since 1933 he was increasingly impressed by the local Andalusian leader Manuel Fal Conde, who advanced intransigent and increasingly militant anti-republican course. In 1934 Fal replaced Rodezno as Secretary General, and in 1935 he assumed the role of Jefé Delegado. Under his guidance and with full approval on part of Alfonso Carlos the party withdrew from the National Bloc and embarked on a stand-alone, non-compromise course.

== Last months ==
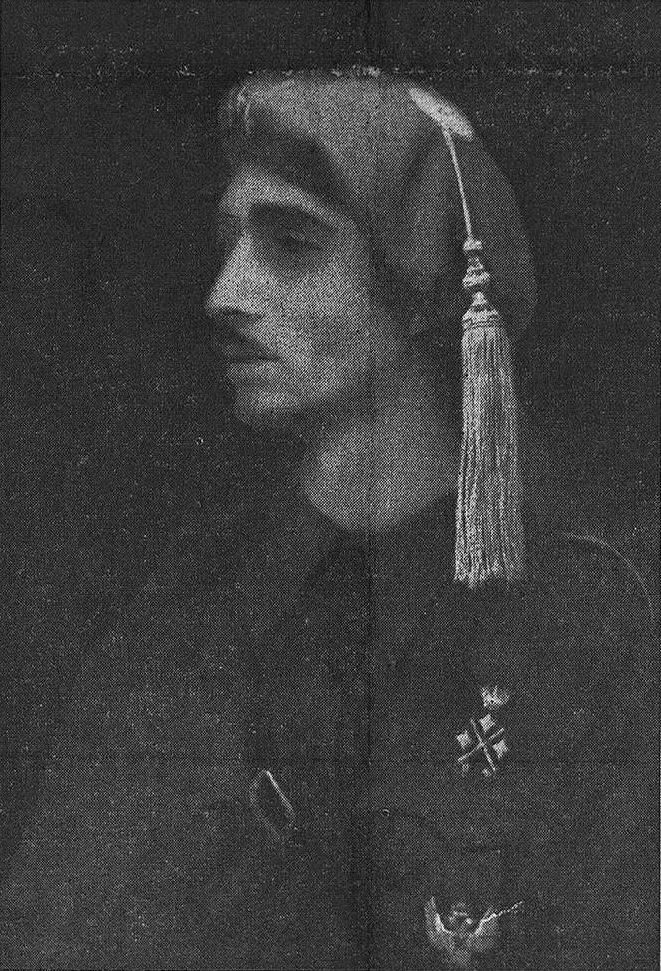
Prince Xavier, 1930s

No source clarifies what was Alfonso Carlos' position versus massive Carlist paramilitary buildup in 1935–1936. Since late 1935 he resided in Guéthary in southern France and until early summer of 1936 he supervised personally Carlist conspiracy plans and their negotiations with the military, approving of conditions that Fal presented to the head of the rebellious generals, Emilio Mola. On 28 June, and for reasons which are not entirely clear, he left Saint Jean de Luz and headed for Vienna, leaving prince Xavier to manage daily politics. From then on it was Xavier who supervised Carlist conspiracy and talks with the military. Alfonso Carlos' approval was sought remotely on most outstanding issues; it is known that he explicitly prohibited any local Navarrese negotiations. Following vague agreement reached in talks with Mola, the final order to rise was issued by prince Xavier in name of Alfonso Carlos. An emissary was immediately flown to Vienna to obtain confirmation; when it arrived the coup was already in full swing.

Alfonso Carlos issued a royal decree which dissolved all Carlist regular executive structures and replaced them with wartime Juntas de Guerra, including the central one. However, from his residence at Theresianumgasse in the Austrian capital the claimant had little further control over the events unfolding. His known statements are mostly enthusiastic acknowledgements of Carlist military effort. One of the very last of his documents was the telegram message with greetings to the requeté detachment known as "40 de Artajona", which on 13 September as the first Nationalist unit entered the captured city of San Sebastián. Similarly, he acknowledged that a hospital in Pamplona had been named after him and that one Carlist militia battalion had been named after his wife. He was impressed with requeté buildup and rather optimistic as to the outcome of the conflict; in his letter of 22 September he declared that "la gloria de nuestros requetés será haber salvado a España y a Europa". No other type of his activity – e.g. in terms of seeking diplomatic support or ensuring financial aid – is known.

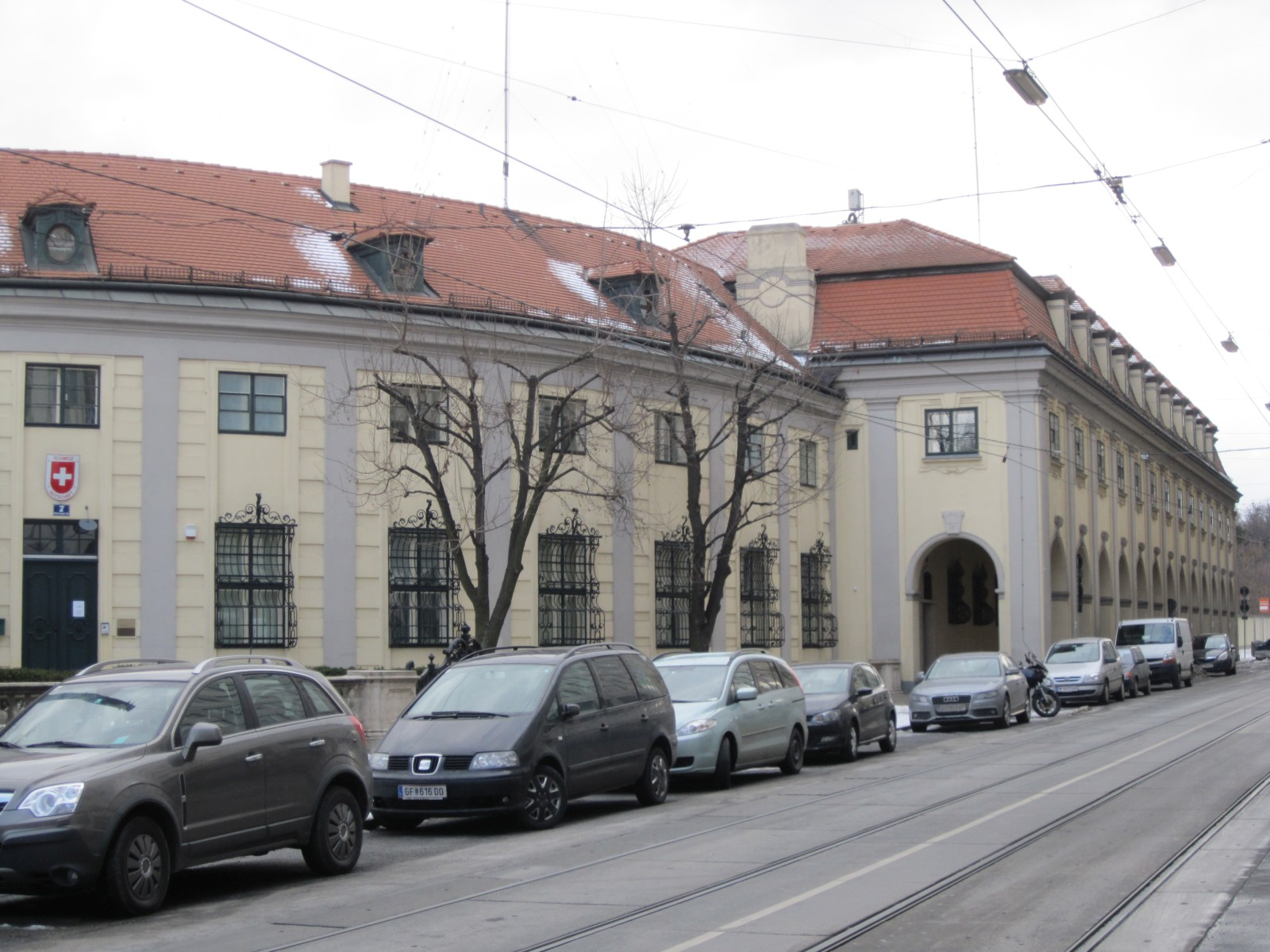
Prinz Eugen-Straße; Alfonso Carlos was hit by a car few metres from here

On 28 September 1936 Alfonso Carlos and his wife as usual decided to take a daily walk in the nearby Belvederegarten. When crossing Prinz Eugen Strasse, with the garden nearby on the other side of the street, the 87-year-old behaved erratically; he stopped in the middle of the tram track, then attempted to run, and was eventually hit by a car approaching from Schwarzenbergplatz. He was immediately taken to the hospital and emergency team was assembled to treat him; following slight improvement in the evening, he perished the following day. One historian speculates – given 12 hours difference between the death of Alfonso Carlos and Franco's ascendance to Caudillo – that the collision might not have been accidental. The funeral and burial in the family chapel in Puchheim was attended by the widow – who emerged unhurt from the accident, by prince Xavier, many aristocratic family members and the Carlist executive, which in corpore travelled by train from the war-engulfed Spain.

== Reception and legacy ==
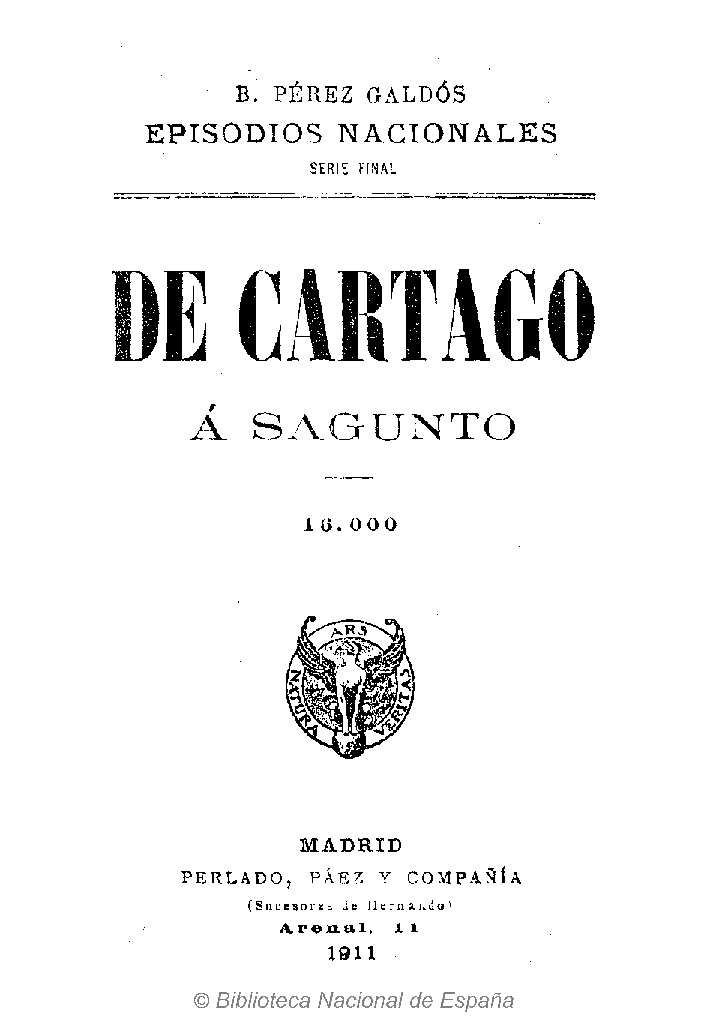
De Cartago a Sagunto

In the Spanish public discourse of the late 19th century Alfonso Carlos featured as an iconic villain, one of a few key protagonists of Carlist atrocities. In the post-war liberal propaganda "saco de Cuenca" played similar role as "masacre de Badajoz" did in the Republican propaganda after the Civil War of 1936–1939; it marked the climax of barbarity, and Alfonso Carlos was held personally responsible for it. Canovas formally requested his extradition from France and in 1878 a book Los sucesos de Cuenca delivered a horror picture of Carlist savagery. In the 1890s a series of popular pamphlets Los crímenes del carlismo by José Nakens repeatedly presented Alfonso Carlos as instigator of various bloody episodes. As late as 1900 the press referred to him as "odioso asesino de Cuenca". The Galdós' novel De Cartago a Sagunto (1911) renewed his image of a blood-stained criminal commander. As somewhat more ambiguous figure he was marginally referred to in great Spanish modernist literature of Unamuno and Baroja. In much less popular Carlist narrative he was hailed as former gallant military leader and member of the royal family.

In the early 20th century the anti-duel activity of Alfonso Carlos earned him some moderate recognition, though not in Spain, where he fell into oblivion. When in 1931 the Spanish press reported on his assumption of the Carlist claim, most titles felt it appropriate to explain to their readers who the person in question was; some noted literally that "there is an uncle of Don Jaime alive, named Alfonso de Borbón, who lives in Austria". It was only sporadically that some titles kept referring to "saqueador de Cuenca", though for elderly pundits like Unamuno he still remained "don Alfonso Carlos, el de Cuenca". On the other hand, the Traditionalist propaganda machinery launched a campaign of exaltation, hailed "nuestro augusto caudillo" and constructed a panegyric mediatic image of the pretendent.

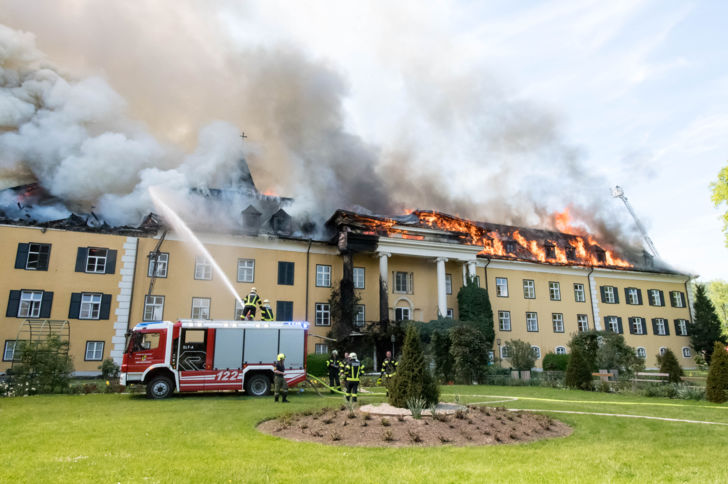
Ebenzweier palace was heavily damaged during the fire of 2016

Alfonso Carlos' memory did not feature prominently in the fragmented post-war Carlism. The Javieristas used to refer to his 1936 regency decision as to legitimization of Don Javier's leadership; some others concluded that with death of Alfonso, the Carlist dynasty extinguished and Carlism came to the end. In the Francoist propaganda he was absent and did not feature in the gallery of Nationalist heroes, as the regime was cautious to enforce official unity and to contain excessive Carlist idolization. Sort of documentary historiographic approximation was offered by Melchor Ferrer in 1950. Ferrer also focused in detail on Alfonso Carlos leadership in the final volume of his monumental series on history of Carlism. It was edited posthumously and issued in 1979; the same year its excerpts were published as a separata under the title of Don Alfonso Carlos de Borbón y Austria-Este. Until the early XXI century it remained the only monograph dedicated to the claimant; Alfonso Carlos failed to trigger historiographic interest and is missing even in detailed accounts on recent history of Spain. Historiography on Carlism tends to focus on his 1936 regency decision, the move which fundamentally affected the fate of the movement for decades to come. In 2012 editors of Alfonso Carlos' diary prefaced it with a 66-page biography, which is currently the best account available.

== Publications ==
- "The Effort to Abolish the Duel", The North American Review 175 (August 1902): 194–200.
- "The Fight Against Duelling in Europe", The Fortnightly Review 90 (1 August 1908): 169–184.
- Resumé de l'histoire de la création et du développement des ligues contre le duel et pour la protection de l'honneur dans les différents pays de l'Europe de fin novembre 1900 à fin octobre 1908 (Vienna: Jasper, 1908). German translation: Kurzgefasste Geschichte der Bildung und Entwicklung der Ligen wider den Zweikampf und zum Schutze der Ehre in den verschiedenen Ländern Europas von Ende November 1900 bis 7. Februar 1908 (Vienna: J. Roller, 1909).
- Documentos de D. Alfonso Carlos de Borbon y de Austria-Este (Madrid: Editorial Tradicionalista, 1950).

== Ancestry ==
Ancestors of Prince Alfonso Carlos, Duke of Anjou and San Jaime

8. Charles IV of Spain
4. Infante Carlos María Isidro of Spain
9. Maria Luisa of Parma
2. Prince Juan, Count of Montizón
10. John VI of Portugal
5. Maria Francisca of Portugal
11. Carlota Joaquina of Spain
1. Alfonso Carlos de Borbón
12. Ferdinand Karl, Archduke of Austria-Este
6. Francis IV, Duke of Modena
13. Maria Beatrice d'Este, Duchess of Massa
3. Maria Beatrix of Austria-Este
14. Victor Emmanuel I of Sardinia
7. Maria Beatrice of Savoy
15. Maria Theresa of Austria-Este

== Footnotes ==
Prince Alfonso Carlos, Duke of Anjou and San Jaime House of Bourbon Cadet branch of the Capetian dynasty Born: 12 September 1849 Died: 29 September 1936
Titles in pretence
Preceded by Prince Jaime, Duke of Anjou and Madrid	— TITULAR — King of Spain; Carlist pretender 2 October 1931 – 29 September 1936	Succeeded by Disputed
Preceded by Prince Jaime, Duke of Anjou and Madrid	— TITULAR — King of France and Navarre; Legitimist succession 2 October 1931 – 29 September 1936	Succeeded by Alfonso XIII
