= Moriz von Kuffner =

Jewish-Austrian industrialist, mountaineer and philanthropist

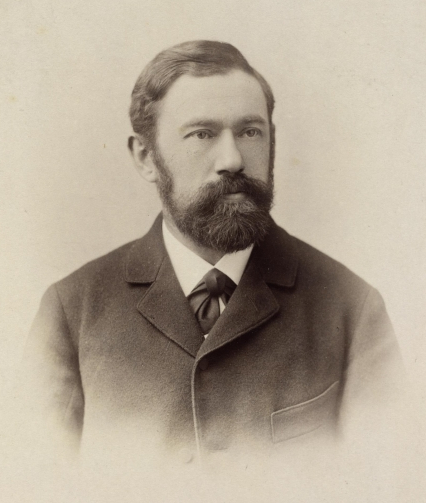
Undated portrait of Moriz von Kuffner

Moriz von Kuffner (30 January 1854 – 5 March 1939) was a Jewish-Austrian industrialist, art collector, mountaineer and philanthropist. From the 1880s to the early 1910s he made a fortune in the brewery business, and became a significant sponsor of Vienna's social and cultural life as well as a mentor of astronomy. Moriz von Kuffner was forced to sell his Austrian assets and to leave Vienna in 1938.

== Industrialist and philanthropist ==
He was born in Ottakring, Lower Austria (then a suburb of Vienna, now a city district), the son of Ignaz Kuffner, member of a Jewish industrialist dynasty from Lundenburg, who (together with his cousin Jacob) had taken over the brewery in Ottakring in 1850. Ignaz Kuffner had been mayor of Ottakring from 1869 to 1876, and was elevated to minor Austrian nobility (Edler von Kuffner) in 1878.

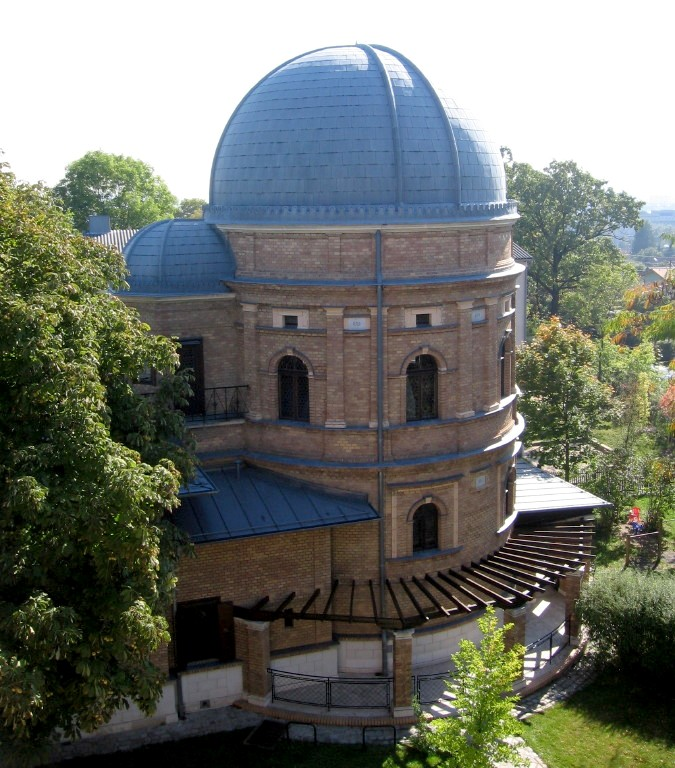
The Kuffner observatory

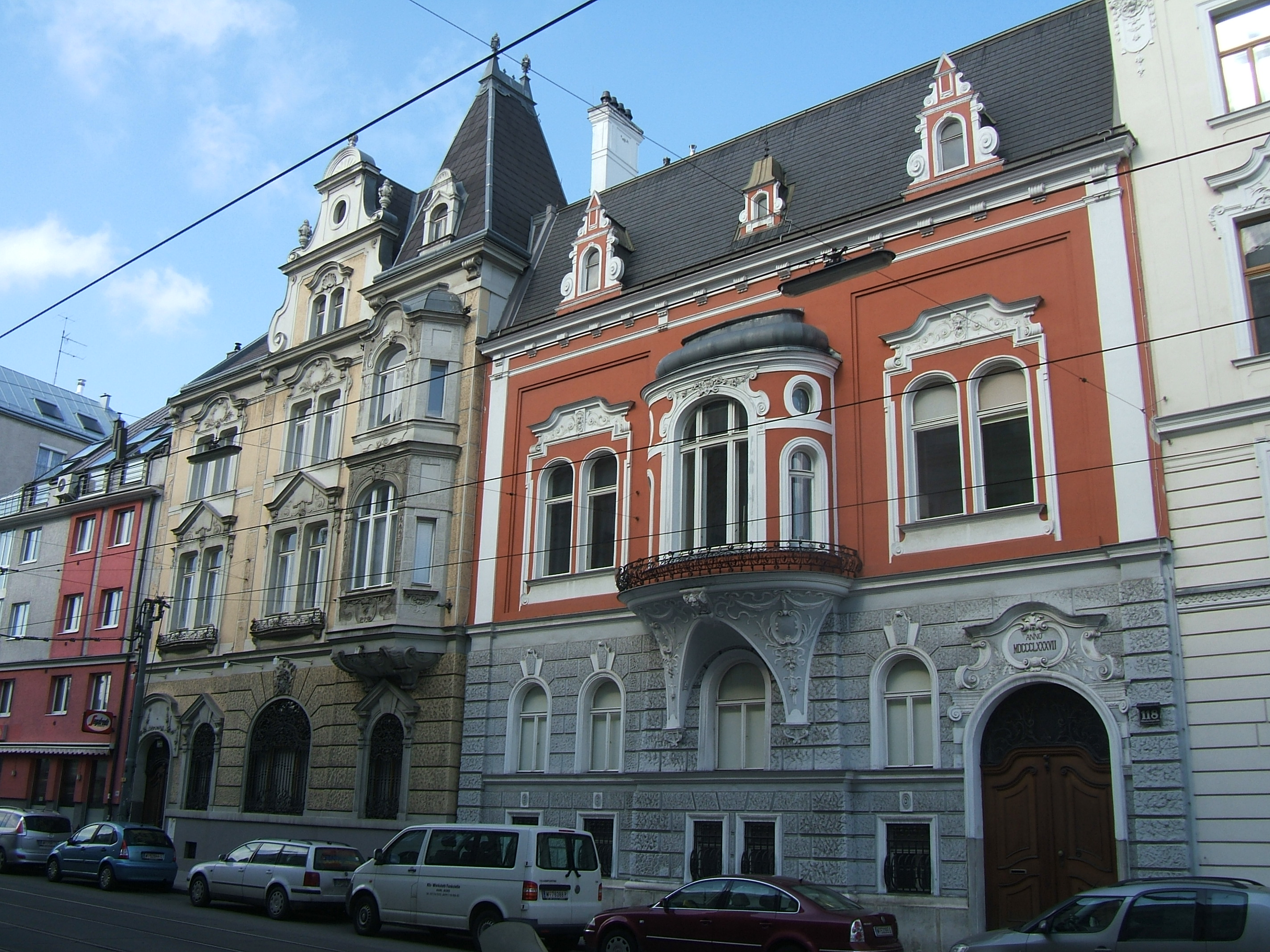
The Palais Kuffner

Moriz von Kuffner studied chemistry at the K.K. Polytechnisches Institut (the predecessor of the Technical University of Vienna). When his father died in 1882, he upgraded and greatly extended the brewery he had inherited. In 1902 he transformed it into a joint stock company, with his cousins Wilhelm Kuffner and Karl Kuffner de Diószegh as partners. He was also president of the sugar refinery in Diószeg in western Slovakia and of the Steinbruck brewery in Budapest; was among the largest owners of real estate in Vienna; owned significant collections of art, including many works by Albrecht Dürer; and was a founding member of the Musikverein. From 1900 to 1919, he was an executive director of the Israelitische Kultusgemeinde Wien. In addition, he was an enthusiastic and highly reputed alpinist who scaled most of the alpine summits of 4,000 m height and above, establishing new routes on the Eiger, Mont Blanc, Mont Pelvoux, Mont Maudit (on which the well-known Kuffner or Frontier ridge is named after him) and others.

Moriz von Kuffner was so fascinated by astronomy that he sponsored the construction, equipment and operation of an observatory on some of his property on the slope of the Gallitzinberg, where at the time of its construction (1884–1892), the Wienerwald reached almost down into Ottakring. This Kuffner observatory is his most important surviving legacy. Kuffner named asteroids 242 Kriemhild and 243 Ida, by courtesy of their discoverer Johann Palisa.

In 1887, he had a representative residence (the Palais Kuffner) built in Ottakring. It quickly became an attraction for Viennese society, culture, and politics.

World War I dealt a significant economic blow to the Kuffner family, and essentially ended the era of their sponsorship. Brewery product sales recovered only very slowly, and profits never returned to the levels seen during the "century of the brewers."

=== Mountaineering ===
During the 1880s and 1890s, Moriz von Kuffner became one of the leading mountaineers in Austria. As a keen and recognised alpinist, he conquered most of the Alpine four-thousanders, blazing new routes, some of which were later named after him, like the Kuffner Ridge (Kuffnergrat) on Mont Maudit and the Kuffner Pillar (Kuffnerpfeiler) on the Piz Palü.^{p. 35} He was accompanied on most of his expeditions by mountain guides, Alexander Burgener, J. M. Biner (also Biener), J. Furrer, A. Kalbermatten, Cl. Perren, Christian Ranggetiner, E. Rubesoir, J. P. Ruppen and Martin Schocher.

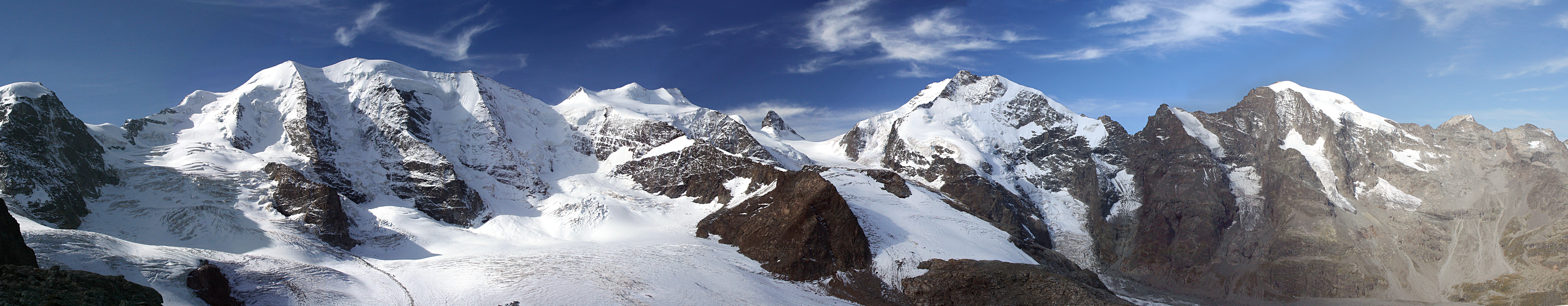
Bernina Group with (left) Piz Palü and the Kuffnerpfeiler (the first of the 3) and (right) the Middle Piz Bernina and Biancograt

Selection of first ascents:

- 1883 Piz Glüscheint in the Bernina Group;
- 8 August 1884 Teufelshorn in the Northwest Ridge (Nordwestgrat) of the Großglockner und Glocknerhorn with Christian Ranggetiner and E. Rubesoier (Teufelshorn)
- 1885 Eiger in the Bernese Oberland, 1st descent along the Northeast Ridge by rappel at some "steps" (Nordostgrat, Mittellegigrat);
- 1885 Laquinhorn (Lagginhorn) via the great spur on the east side;
- 1887 Mont Blanc from Géant Glacier up the eastern side of Mont Maudit;
- 1887 Aiguille des Glaciers East-Southeast Ridge (Ostsüdostgrat) in the southwestern Mont Blanc Group
- 1888 Mont Pelvoux over the western part of the northeast flank in the Dauphiné
- 15 July 1890 Portjengrat / Pizzo d'Andolla over the East Ridge (Ostgrat, Grenzgrat) in the Weißmies Group (eastern Wallis Alps) with Alexander Burgener and J.P.Ruppen
- 1899 East Summit of Piz Palü in the Bernina Group over the eastern North Face pillar (Kuffner pillar)

== Forced emigration and death ==
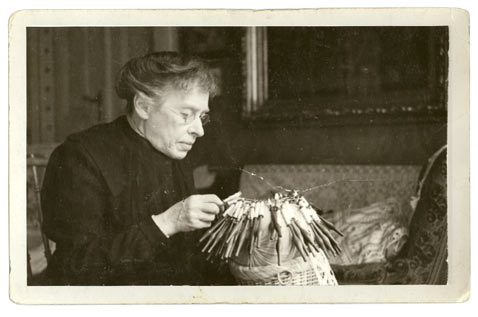
Wife Elsa von Kuffner

The year 1938 was disastrous for the 84-year-old Moriz von Kuffner in multiple ways. In January his wife Elsa and then in February his eldest son Ignaz died, and he himself fell ill. Moreover, after the Anschluss of Austria to the Third Reich the Kuffner family was subjected to the full range of harassments and physical threats which the newly empowered National Socialists could mount against Jewish industrialists. On 13 March 1938, Moriz averted a forceful attempt by a Sturmabteilung to take over the brewery only by placing his single non-Jewish executive - the laboratory director - formally in charge of the company. In a desperate attempt to salvage whatever he could before the family had to leave Vienna, Moriz' son Stephan Kuffner negotiated the sale of the brewery to an "Aryan" industrialist for 14 million Schilling. Although this was much more than Jewish proprietors of comparable assets had to settle for, it represented only a fraction of the brewery's actual valuation at this time. The government approved the transaction on 6 June 1938 and immediately fined the new owner, Gustav Harmer, a penalty tax of 3 million Reichsmark for "attempts to disguise Jewish property."

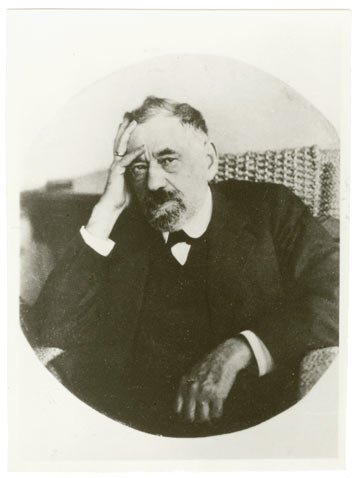
Moriz von Kuffner as an old man

With the assistance of a fellow alpinist Moriz von Kuffner - an already very old and very ill man - obtained an immigration permit for Switzerland. He had to pay the Reichsfluchtsteuer (the emigration tax), amounting to 3 million Reichsmark. Kuffner died on 5 March 1939 in Zürich's Hirslanden clinic and was interred at the Rehalp cemetery in the Weinegg district.

== Post-war restitution ==
The modalities of compensation which were negotiated with Kuffner's heirs after World War II have been cited as a positive example for the restitution of Jewish assets that were expropriated under the rule of National Socialism in Austria. The owners of the Ottakring brewery made contact with the Kuffner family as soon as 1945. In August 1950, an agreement was reached under which Moriz' seven entitled heirs received $440,000; Stephan Kuffner received Schwechat brewery stock worth one million Austrian Schillings. In return, the Kuffner family waived their rights to the Palais Kuffner. Those parts of the confiscated Kuffner library which had been incorporated into the Austrian National Library were restituted by the state.

== The Kuffner foundation ==
In 1960, Stephan Kuffner established the Moriz und Elsa von Kuffner foundation in Switzerland. It supports collaborative projects in remote Swiss mountain areas and nurse education.

== Honors ==
In 2006, the main-belt asteroid 12568 Kuffner was named in honor of Moriz von Kuffner's sponsorship of astronomy.

== Literature ==
- Darthé, M. Ottakringer - Eine Unternehmensgeschichte unter besonderer Berücksichtigung der Eigentümerverhältnisse. LIT Verlag, Wien 2007. ISBN 978-3-8258-0499-2
- Fischer, Katja. Jüdische Kunstsammlungen in Wien vor 1938 am Beispiel der Familie Kuffner. Universität Wien. M.Sc. Thesis, August 2008 Online PDF (German) Accessed 2009-05-31 Archived
