= Ottakring =

Coordinates: 48°12′45″N 16°18′38″E

Ottakring Ottakring (Bavarian)
- 16th District of Vienna
- Coat of arms

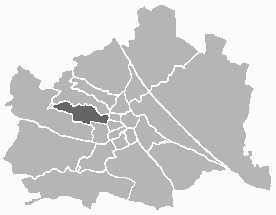
- Location of the district within Vienna
- Country: Austria
- City: Vienna

Government
  - District Director: Stefanie Lamp (SPÖ)
  - First Deputy: Florian Saurwein (SPÖ)
  - Second Deputy: Barbara Obermaier (Green)
  - Representation (60 Members): SPÖ 24, Green 13, FPÖ 10, ÖVP 5 NEOS (Austria) 4, KPÖ 4

Area
  - Total: 8.67 km^{2} (3.35 sq mi)

Population (2016-01-01)
  - Total: 102,580
  - Density: 11,800/km^{2} (30,600/sq mi)
- Postal code: A-1160
- Address of District Office: Richard-Wagner-Platz 19; A-1164 Wien
- Website: www.wien.gv.at/ottakring/

Ottakring (German pronunciation: [ˈɔtaˌkʀɪŋ]) is the 16th District in the city of Vienna, Austria (German: 16. Bezirk, Ottakring). It is located west of the central districts, north of Penzing and south of Hernals. Ottakring has some heavily populated urban areas with many residential buildings. It was formed from the independent villages of Ottakring and Neulerchenfeld in 1892.

== Geography ==
The district of Ottakring is located in the western part of Vienna between the Gürtel (a substantial road around Vienna) and the hills of the Wienerwald (Vienna forest). The district of Hernals borders to the north, Josefstadt and Neubau to the east, and Rudolfsheim-Fünfhaus and Penzing to the south. The highest points in the district are the Gallitzinberg (449 m), also known as Wilheminenberg because a palace (Schloss Wilheminenberg) is situated on its slope.

The buildings vary considerably in style. The working class settled around the industries and factories near the Gürtel, resulting in a dense checkerboard pattern of residential housing. A little further up is a collection of villas around the Ottakring cemetery surrounded by an extensive number of deciduous trees.

The district is made up of 36.7% green space (of which 22% is forest), 45.4% buildings, and 17.9% transportation. Thaliastraße is the busiest and most commercially important street in the district. A total of 1.23% of the land area is used for agriculture. The once important vineyards have mostly disappeared. Gardens are found primarily around castle Wilhelminenberg and towards the border to Penzing.

== History ==
=== The village Ottakring ===
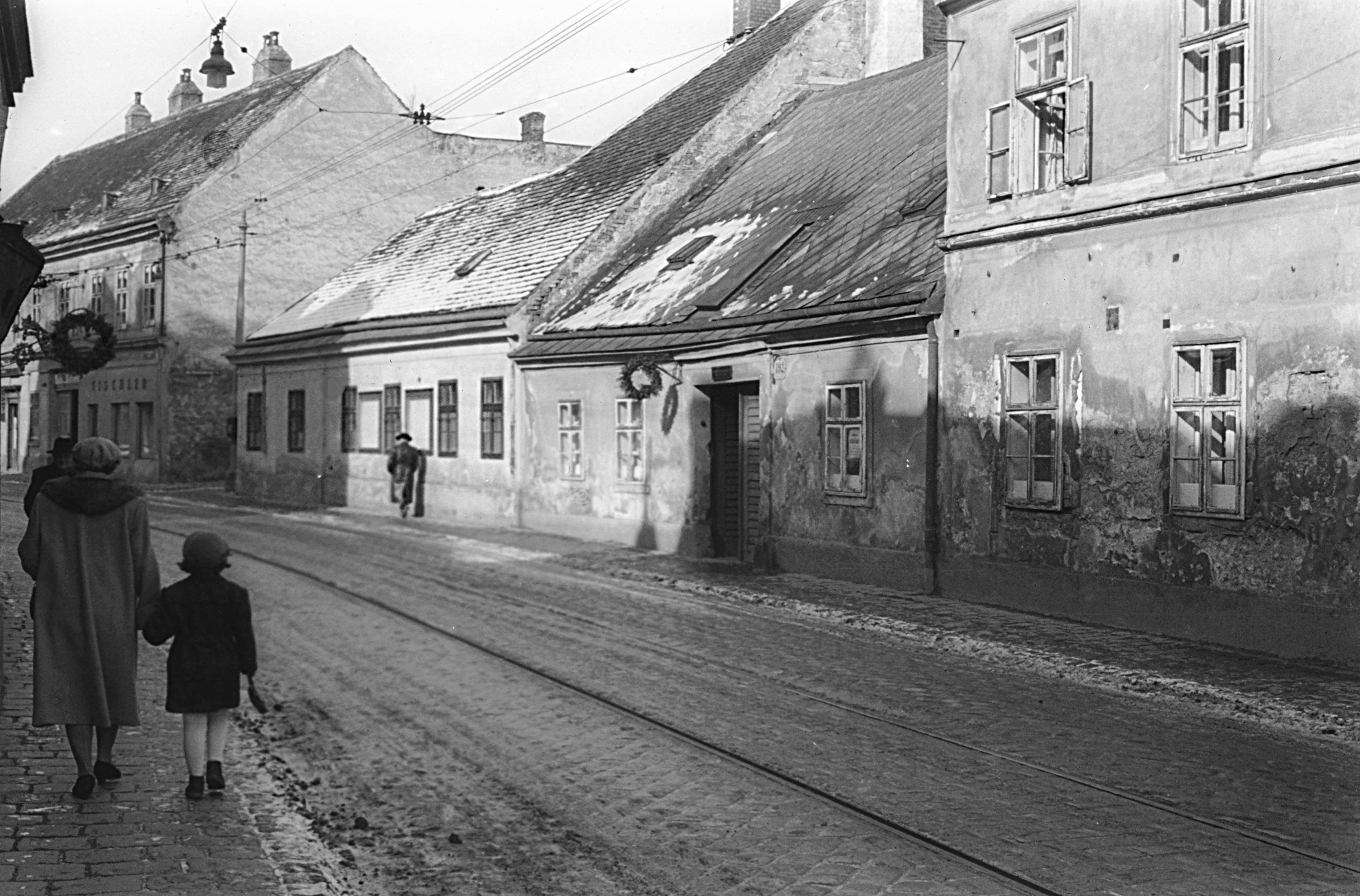
"Alt-Ottakring" in 1955

The original Ottakring was founded about 1,000 years ago by Bavarian settlers who cleared a small patch of forest on the cityward slope of the Gallitzinberg. (The exact date is not known because, as with most other places in the area, no document has survived.) It was situated where the Ottakring Cemetery is today, straddling a creek (the Ottakringer Bach) which now has completely disappeared from view, forming part of Vienna's drainage systems. Originally the Ottakringer Bach flowed along what today are the streets of Ottakringer Straße, Abelegasse, and Thaliastraße; through Lerchenfelderstraße and the Minoritenplatz; and into the Donaukanal, an arm of the Danube river. The "oldest Ottakring" settlement was completely destroyed in 1683 during the Battle of Vienna. The village was rebuilt further downstream on the Ottakringer Bach, closer to Vienna. This nucleus, parts of which survived into the 1980s, was what became known as Alt-Ottakring in the 19th and 20th century.

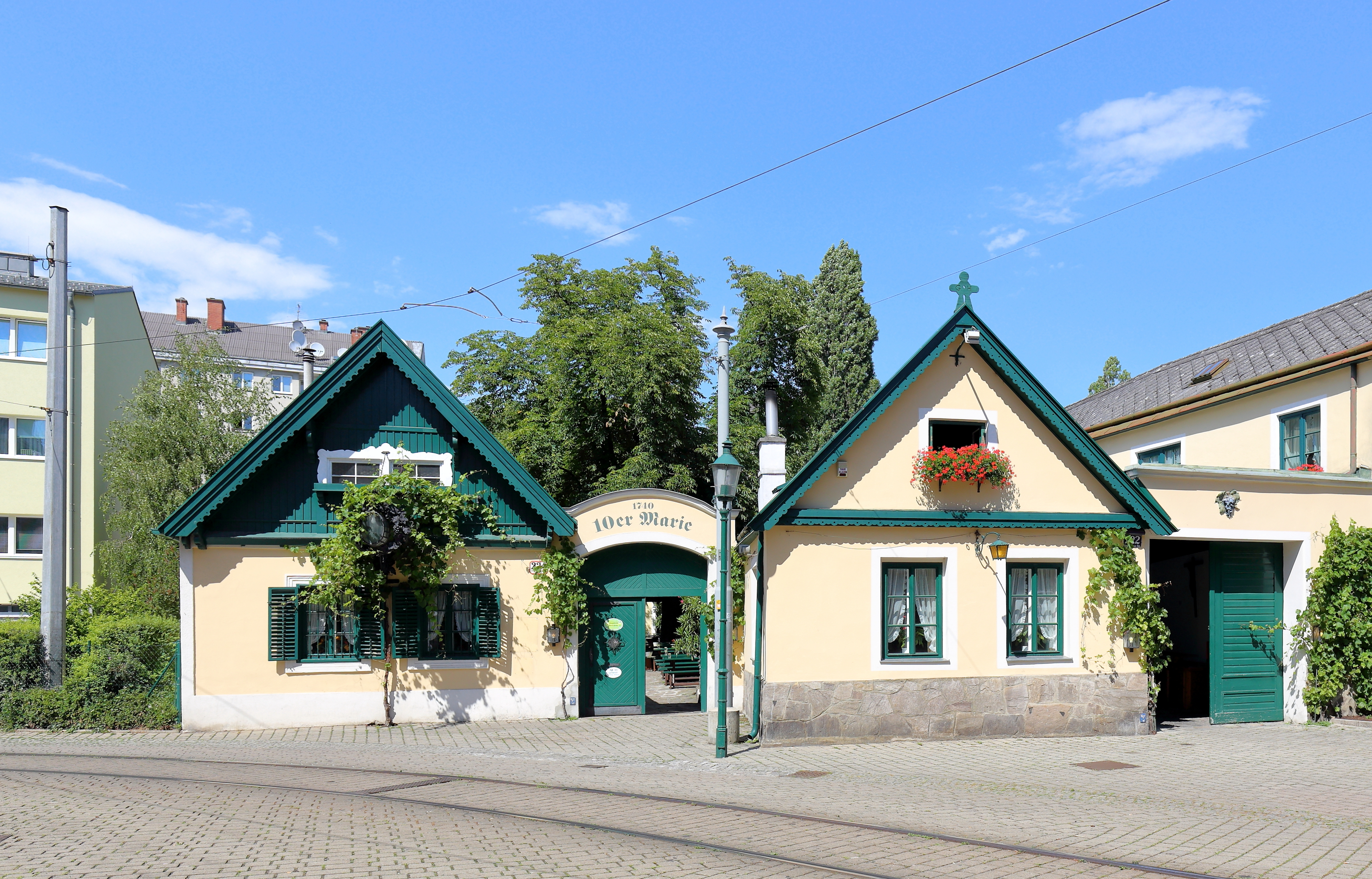
Traditional Heuriger 10er Marie in Alt-Ottakring

=== Incorporation to Vienna ===
In 1888, emperor Franz Joseph I declared that he wanted to unite Vienna with the surrounding villages. The Lower Austrian government passed a law, the Eingemeindung der Vororten zu Wien (Incorporation of Villages to Vienna) in 1890. On 1 January 1892 the resolution took effect. Despite initial resistance, the independent villages of Ottakring and Neulerchenfeld were merged into the 16th district of Vienna, which had 106,861 residents.

After incorporation, the area experienced rapid growth. By 1910, 177,687 people lived in Ottakring. Though the number of employment opportunities was limited, the number of workers was extremely high. This encouraged industries to move to the area.

=== The World Wars and their aftermath ===
After World War I, residential construction boomed. Between 1922 and 1934, 28 Gemeindebauanlagen (community housing projects/municipal apartment complexes) with more than 4,517 apartments were constructed. Among this number were the 1,587 apartments of the Sandleitenhof, which was the largest apartment complex in Vienna to date. The economic collapse of the 1930s brought great adversity to the district with unemployment surging to over 50%. The brief Austrian Civil War of 1934 brought major instability and fighting to the region. The local insurgency overpowered the army of the original Social Democratic Party, and the residential buildings escaped mostly unharmed. There was however heavy fighting around the workers' housing in the Kreitnergasse Street.

During World War II, air defence of Vienna and some southeastern parts of the Third Reich territory were coordinated from the Gaugefechtsstand Wien, situated at the Gallitzinberg.

After the war, Ottakring belonged to the French-occupied zone of Vienna (which was divided into quarters and split among the Allies). The efforts to rebuild the area were slow at first and eventually even the oldest parts of the district were finally renovated. The French replaced the Negerdörfel barracks and construction continued.

=== Recent times ===
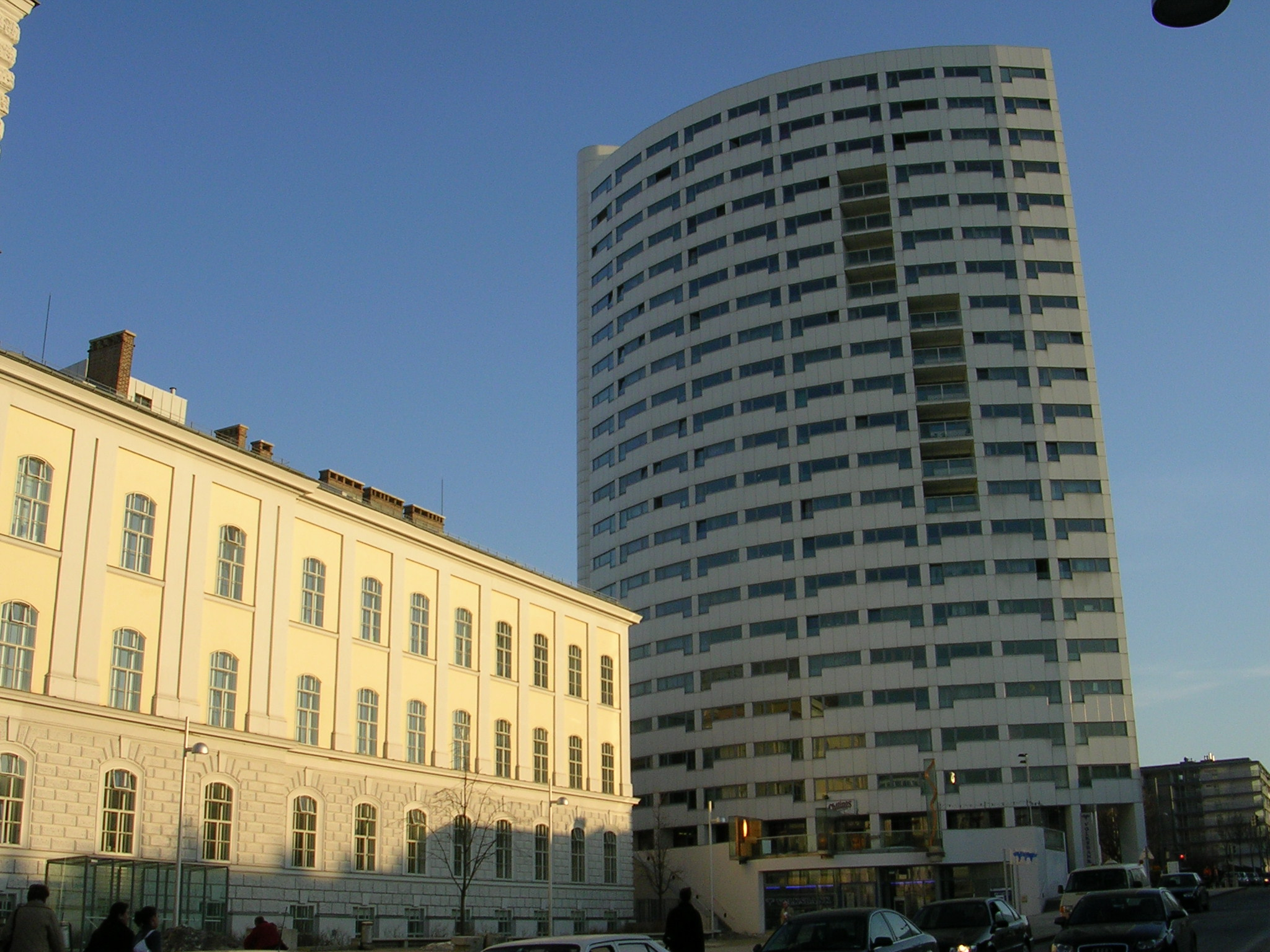
The Schwesternturm at the U3 subway terminal

Extension of the subway line U3 into Ottakring in 1998 brought neighborhood revitalization to the areas surrounding the new subway station. The above-ground station marked the end of the U3 line, and earned the name Schwesternturm (literally Sisters Tower, but originates from the German Krankenschwester, nurse) due to the secondary use of this residential building as a lodging for nurses. The empty factories of an old tobacco company and the long-unused stores beneath the arches for the Schnellbahn (fast local trains) were converted into a technical school (HTL, Höhere Technische Lehranstalt). The centre of Vienna can be reached in 13 minutes via the subway.

== Demographics ==
Approximately 12,000 residents originate from Serbia or the former Yugoslavia, and more than 4,000 from Turkey. They tend to concentrate in the old, densely populated, and sometimes desolate inner-city parts of the district, while the western parts of Ottakring are suburban in character, almost exclusively Austrian, and relatively affluent. Vienna's demographic statisticians predict an exacerbation of this division, making ghettoization an increasing concern.

== The 'Balkan Mile' ==
The "Balkan Mile" (Also known as "Balkanstrasse") is a neighborhood sitting on the border of the 17th and 16th districts of Vienna, centered along the major street Ottakringer Straße. It has a high concentration of Yugoslavian cafes, restaurants and nightclubs, where the Serbian language is mainly spoken, and Turbo Folk music is played. This stretch of the Ottakringer Straße is commonly referred to as the "Balkan Mile" (Balkanmeile), and represents a Yugoslav/Serbian enclave in Vienna.

== Politics ==
=== District Government ===
District Directors since 1945
Theobald Wiesinger (KPÖ)	4/1945-1946
Augustin Scholz (SPÖ)	1946–1964
Hans Hobl (SPÖ)	1964–1970
Josef Srp (SPÖ)	1970–1979
Alfred Barton (SPÖ)	1980–1996
Ernestine Graßberger (SPÖ)	1996–2004
Franz Prokop (SPÖ)	2004–present

The directorship was elected by a common vote until 1918. After that, the Social Democrats designated the district as a worker's district. On 4 May 1919 the Social Democrats gained the great majority of the vote and voted the railroader Johann Politzer to be District Director. He held the position until 1934, when the Patriotic Front party took power in Austria. After the fall of the Nazis in November 1945, the people were able to freely vote for the first time in 10 years. Of the 30 government positions, the SPÖ won 20 seats, ÖVP won 8, and KPÖ won 2. The SPÖ held their dominance for decades, until the start of the 1990s. In 1996, the FPÖ gained a lot of popularity at the expense of the SPÖ, with the SPÖ falling from 50.54% to 40.58%, and the FPÖ gaining 30.59%. The trend reversed itself in 2001, when the SPÖ rose back up to 49.45% and the FPÖ fell down to 20.86%. The Greens took 12.54% in 2001, putting them at almost the same level as the ÖVP, which took 13.13%. The Liberal Forum lost almost half of their support and with 2.47% took only one seat representation.

=== Coat of arms ===
The left half of the coat of arms stands for the once-independent town of Ottakring. The 3 green hills symbolise the three important features of Ottakring: Jubiläumswarte, Gallitzinberg and Predigtstuhl. The cross-shield and mitre hat stand for the monastery of Klosterneuburg.

The right half of the coat of arms illustrates the origin of the name of "Neulerchenfeld". A larch tree (German: Lärche) with circling larks (German: Lerche) sits in a field (German: Feld), giving the name Neulerchenfeld ("new-larks-field").

== Economy ==
Industries settled quickly in the district after it was incorporated into Vienna. In 1898 a tobacco factory opened on Thaliastraße (Thalia Street). Other notable new companies in Ottakring included photographic industries, such as Herlango, and factories producing industrial machinery, such as Österreichische Industriewerke Warchalowski, and Eißler & Co. AG. The textile industry was largest employer. Following World War II, many of the industries relocated to other areas, creating marked disparities between residential neighborhoods and areas with abandoned factories. The best known companies still operating in Ottakring are the Ottakring Brewery and the coffee roaster Julius Meinl.

== Sightseeing ==
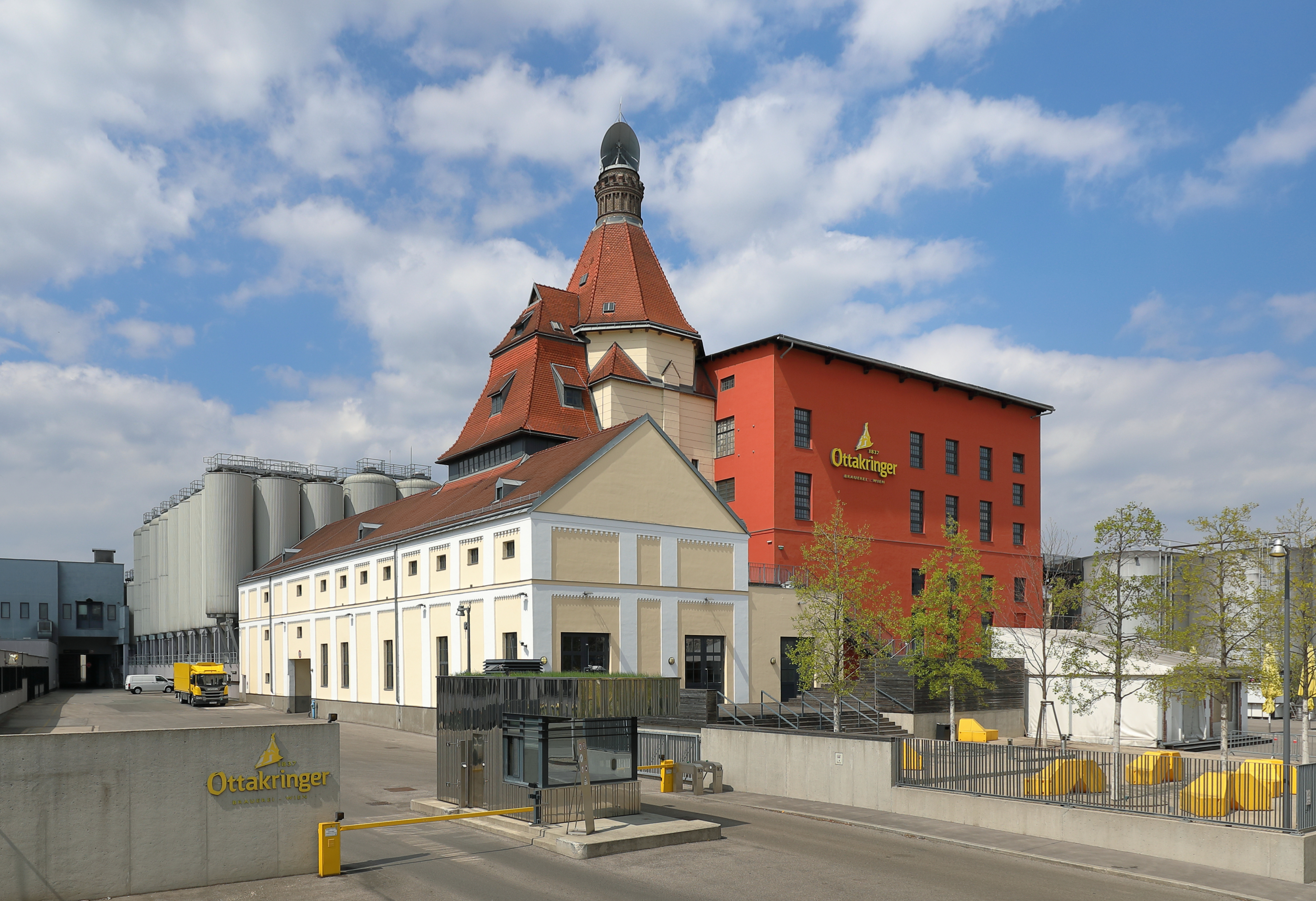
Ottakring Brewery

- Ottakring Brewery
- Jubiläumswarte at the summit of the Gallitzinberg
- Schloss Wilhelminenberg
- Kuffner observatory
- Heuriger "10er Marie"
- Palais Kuffner

== Notable people from Ottakring ==
- Muhammet Akagündüz, footballer at SV Ried
- Arik Brauer, painter (born in Ottakring)
- Roger M. Buergel, Curator
- Horst Chmela, songwriter, musician
- Ludwig Gruber, composer, singer, writer, and conductor
- Michael Häupl, Mayor of Vienna (lives in Ottakring)
- Karl Hodina, musician
- Fritz Janschka, painter
- Familie Kuffner / Moriz von Kuffner
- Peter Kruder, musician, DJ
- Johann and Josef Schrammel, composers of Schrammelmusik
- Franz Schuhmeier, Social-Democrat
- Josef Uridil, Footballer
- Josef Weidinger, Boxer
- Josef Weinheber, lyricist and essayist
- Moritz Nowak, 1835-1916. Businessman and philanthropist. Member of Ottakring Community Board/Municipal Council, until 1882
