= 242 Kriemhild =

Main belt asteroid

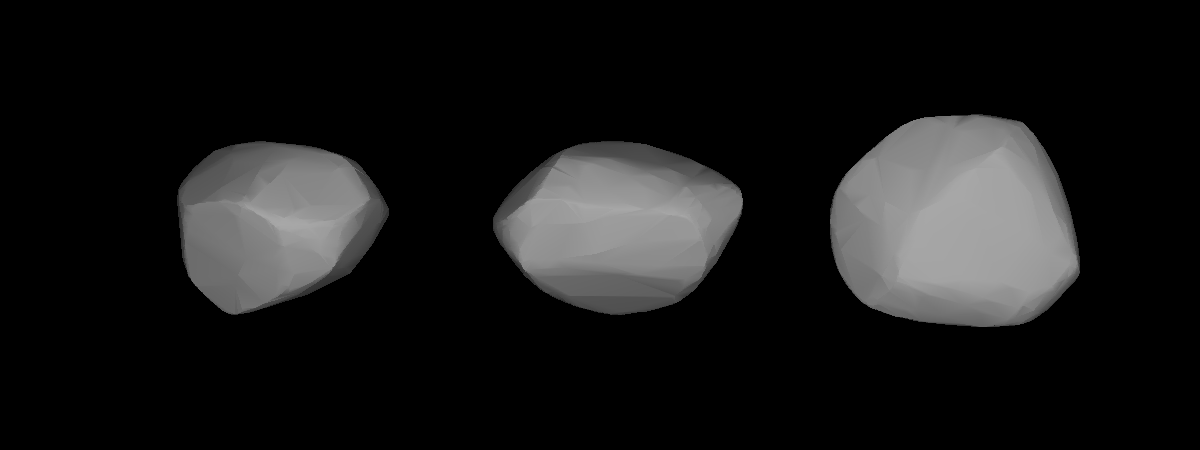
- A three-dimensional model of 242 Kriemhild based on its lightcurve

Discovery
- Discovered by: Johann Palisa
- Discovery date: 22 September 1884

Designations
- Pronunciation: German: [ˈkʁiːmhɪlt]
- Named after: Kriemhild
- Alternative designations: A884 SA
- Minor planet category: Main belt

Orbital characteristics
- Epoch 31 July 2016 (JD 2457600.5)
- Uncertainty parameter 0
- Observation arc: 131.23 yr (47931 d)
- Aphelion: 3.2036 AU (479.25 Gm)
- Perihelion: 2.52045 AU (377.054 Gm)
- Semi-major axis: 2.86202 AU (428.152 Gm)
- Eccentricity: 0.11935
- Orbital period (sidereal): 4.84 yr (1768.5 d)
- Average orbital speed: 17.6 km/s
- Mean anomaly: 351.010°
- Mean motion: 0° 12^{m} 12.823^{s} / day
- Inclination: 11.351°
- Longitude of ascending node: 206.940°
- Argument of perihelion: 279.764°

Physical characteristics
- Dimensions: 38.90±2.1 km
- Mass: (6.1±2.4)×10^{17} kg (Note: Calculated from its standard gravitational parameter GM = 0.041±0.016 km^{3}/s^{2}.)
- Mean density: 17.20 g/cm^{3} (Note: Assuming a diameter of 40.8 km.)
- Synodic rotation period: 4.5478 h (0.18949 d)
- Geometric albedo: 0.2440±0.029
- Absolute magnitude (H): 9.3

242 Kriemhild is a main belt asteroid that was discovered by Austrian astronomer Johann Palisa on 22 September 1884 in Vienna and was named after Kriemhild, a mythological Germanic princess, by Moriz von Kuffner, a Viennese industrialist and sponsor of astronomy.

Photometric observations of this asteroid at the Oakley Observatory in Terre Haute, Indiana, during 2006 gave a light curve with a period of 4.558 ± 0.003 hours and a brightness variation of 0.15 ± 0.02 in magnitude.
