= Ottakringer =

Brewery in Ottakring, Vienna, Austria

Coordinates: 48.212°N 16.324°E

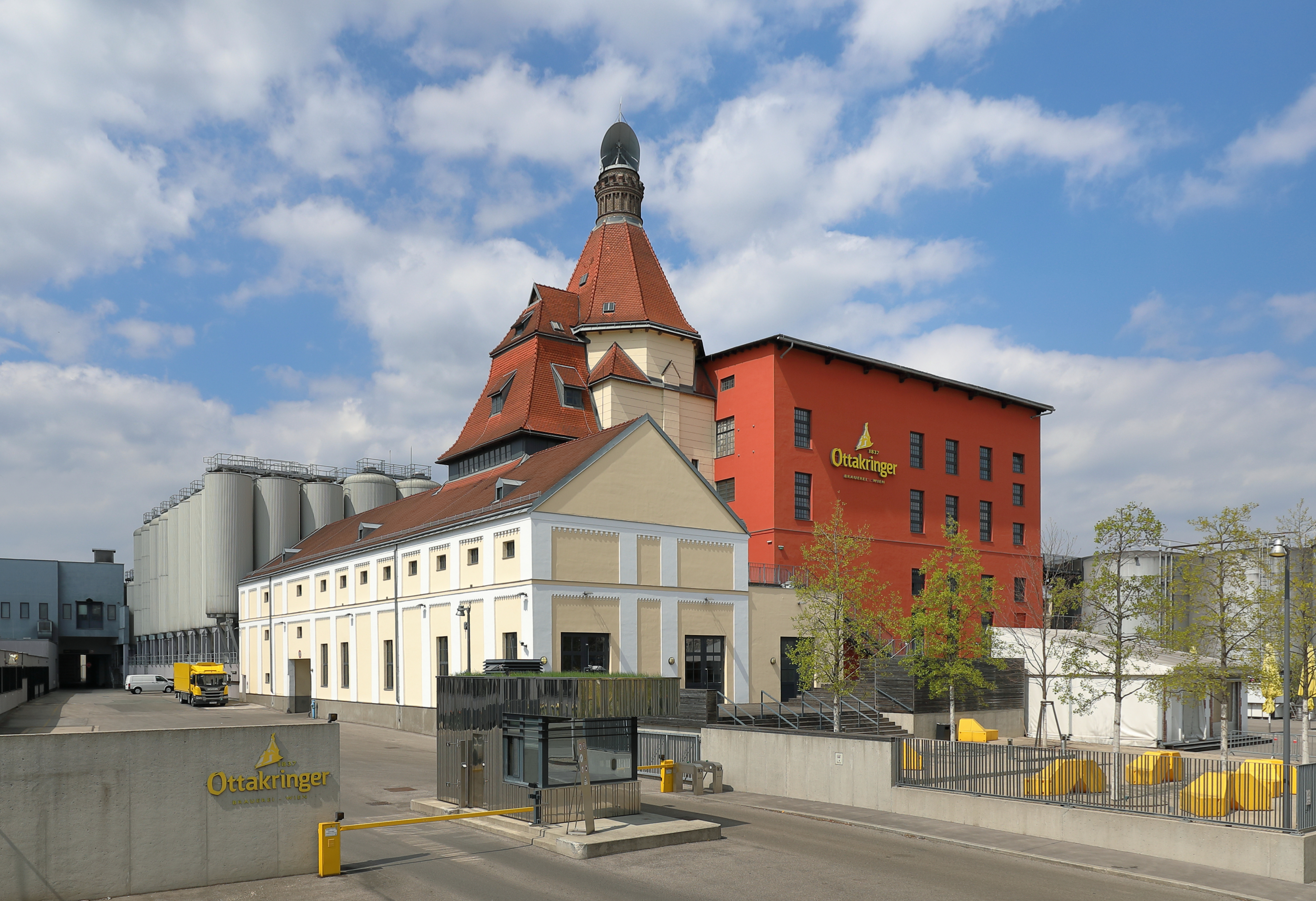
The Ottakringer brewery site in Vienna

Ottakringer (German pronunciation: [ˈɔtɐˌkʀɪŋɐ]) is the last large brewery remaining in Vienna, Austria, and is located in Ottakring, the 16th district of Vienna.

== History ==
The Ottakringer brewery was opened in 1837 by the master miller Heinrich Plank under the name of Planksche Brauerei, after the ruling diocese of Klosterneuburg had granted approval for brewing. In 1850, it was taken over and expanded into a large brewery by the cousins, Ignaz and Jakob Kuffner from Lundenburg. Within ten years, the production increased from 18,318 hl to 64,183 hl. When Kaiser Franz Joseph ordered that the city walls be pulled down and a large number of residential buildings began to be built, Ottakringer grew as well. A new fermentation cellar and a larger warehouse went into operation. Around 1890, the production was already at about 170,000 hl. Moriz von Kuffner, the son of Ignaz von Kuffner, took over the brewery in 1882 and increased the production to over 350,000 hl in the last year before the war, a quantity which was not again reached between the World Wars. In 1905, Kuffner converted the brewery into a joint-stock company.

Even before the annexation of Austria by Nazi Germany, Moriz von Kuffner was forced to sell his business because of his Jewish background. It was sold for a rather low price of 14 million Austrian schillings (about 36 million euros at today's values) to Gustav Harmer, who was also forced out of the business for two years after the war. After the liberation by the Allies, the brewery was temporarily managed by the Russians, before the Harmer family managed to legally prove their purchase and again manufactured 150,000 hl as of 1955. The heirs of Moriz von Kuffner, who had died in Zürich in the meantime, were compensated because of their expulsion and the threats of the Nazi regime, which had led to the sale of the business to the Harmer family.

In 1977, the brewery considerably contributed to the breaking up of the beer cartel by withdrawing from it. From that time on, any restaurant could choose whichever beer brewery it wanted as a supplier, independently of its location. In 1986, Ottakringer was listed on the stock exchange. In 1989, bottling in the brown bottles usually used in Austria was stopped and Ottakringer was the first brewery in Austria to introduce the well-known green "shoulder bottles".

In 2007, the company initiated a joint partnership with an Iranian company to build a factory in Tehran for producing non-alcoholic beer.

== Structure of the company ==
The parent company, Ottakringer Holding AG, which is owned by families Wenckheim, Menz, Trauttenberg and Pfusterschmid, hold 88% shares of Ottakringer Getränke AG, the Ottakringer Getränke AG owns 6% of the shares, the rest of the shares are held in free float.

The parent company also owns the mineral water manufacturer, Vöslauer, which is located in Bad Vöslau.

== Products ==
The most popular brand is Ottakringer Helles, a beer with an alcohol content of 5.2% and a wort of 11.8° Plato. Other brands are the Goldfassl special beer or Goldfassl Pils, a light, pilsner-style beer, as well as the Ottakringer Radler, which is a mixture of 50% Helles and 50% lemonade. Also in the range of products is the nearly alcohol-free beer, Null Komma Josef, whose brandname is an allusion to its alcohol content of under 0.5%. In contrast, the brewery's strongest beer (7.6% alcohol) is the Ottakringer Bock, which is only produced for special occasions (Christmas and Easter). The company also produces Ottakringer Dunkles, a dark beer, Ottakringer G'mischtes, a mixture of light and dark beer, Ottakringer Zwickl, an unfiltered light beer, and Ottakringer Zwickl Rot, a darker unfiltered beer brewed with melanoidin malt.

== Trivia ==
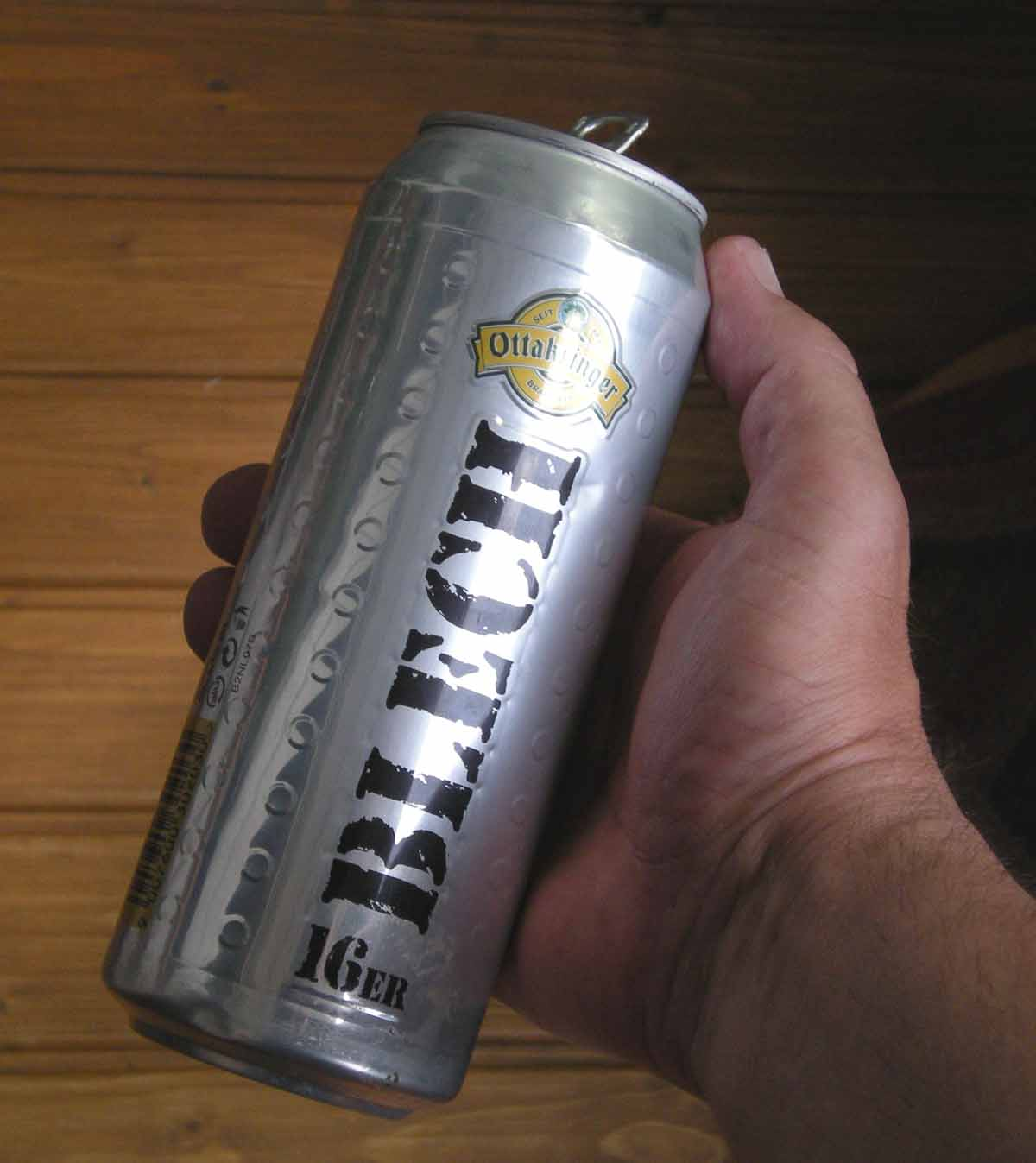
16er Blech

The Viennese have a special expression for the canned beer, 16er-Blech (16-tin sheet), mainly for the Ottakringer Helles. The expression, 16er-Hüs'n, is also used for both the bottled and the canned beer. These are references to the origin of the beer in the 16th district of Vienna and the can that contains it. At the beginning of 2007, the brewery took advantage of this and marketed a new kind of canned beer under the name of 16er Blech.

Various rooms of the brewery can also be used as an event location.

The brewery has sponsored the Austrian football champions SK Rapid Wien for many years.
