= Gaugefechtsstand Wien =

Coordinates: 48°13′20″N 16°16′01″E

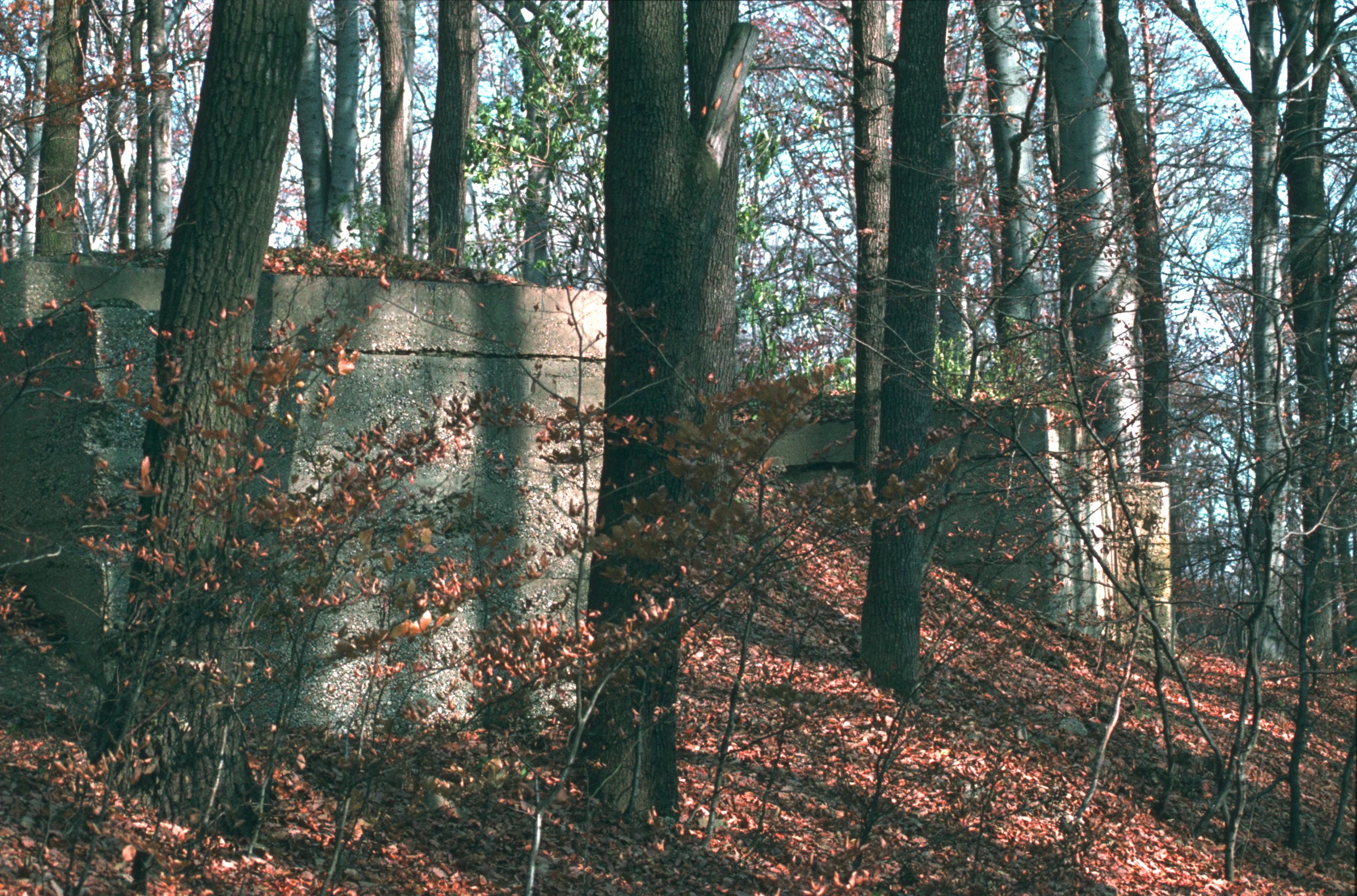
The remnants of the entrance to the gasoline storage facilities of the "Schirach-Bunker", shortly before their destruction in 1983

The Gaugefechtsstand Wien (regional combat command center Vienna) was a World War II subterranean command bunker situated in the densely forested Wienerwald western parts of Ottakring, the 16th district of Vienna. Commonly known as the Schirach-Bunker (named after the Nazi governor for the Reichsgau Wien, Baldur von Schirach), the facilities were constructed between 1942 and 1945 as a massive underground extension to barracks that had been established in 1940.

== Function and layout ==
The primary function of the Gaugefechtsstand Wien was to provide strategic air raid warning and air defence coordination for Vienna (which was defended by three Flak towers) and to assist air defence in the entire south-eastern region of the Third Reich. The Drahtfunk (a power line communication system similar to the Norwegian Linjesender) was used to broadcast air raid warnings.

From the main entrance at the top of the Gallitzinberg hill, a blast-proofed staircase descended 25 meters to the main tunnel (profile, 2 x 2 meters) which ran for about 100 meters horizontally to the north, ending in a secondary entrance where a small power plant was situated. Another tunnel diverged eastward towards the 17 x 5 meter actual bunker core. On its upper level were the communications facilities, with landlines to all civil emergency services, the Führer Headquarters, the Oberkommando der Luftwaffe and even the Kriegsmarine. On the lower level were the command center, a meeting room and Schirach's personal facilities. The tunnel system had a total length of 340 meters. A tripartite security zone system controlled access to the installation.

The Gaugefechtsstand Wien was evacuated, and its entrances were destroyed by explosives, on April 4, 1945 as the advancing Red Army shock troops took Hütteldorf, a suburb of Vienna situated 2.5 km southward of the command center.

== Post-war period ==
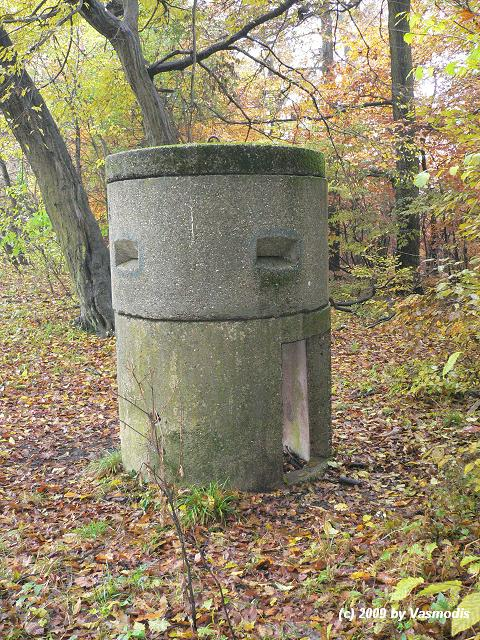
Guard shelter near the former bunker main entrance

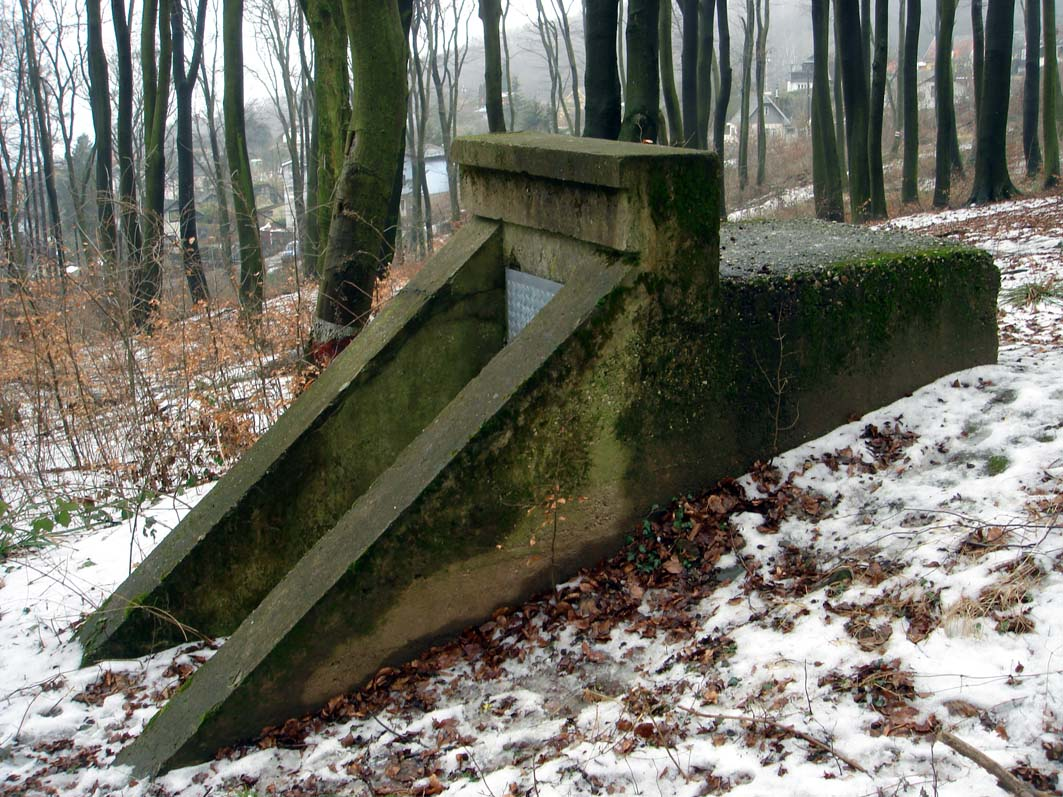
An entrance to the drainage system of the "Schirach-Bunker"

After the war, rumors and theories about the bunker abounded because the area had been under highly effective quarantine. Popular but unsupported folklore included tales of secret weapon caches, loot hidden by the fleeing Nazis, and a tunnel to Schirach's private residence. Most of the remaining groundside structures were razed in 1983, apparently to end the repeated clandestine attempts to explore the remains of the bunker. By 2009 only some remnants of the northern exit remained, as well as three concrete shelters for the guards and five remote entrances to the drainage system which might not connect directly to the actual bunker. Fragments of an ancillary sentry (or according to others, gasoline storage) bunker in the former outer security zone, now mostly buried in the forest loam, can be found close to the nearby road.

In 2003 an Austrian government commission briefly opened and entered parts of the former Gaugefechtsstand, avoiding publicity and without directly reporting results of the investigations. Subsequently a Viennese journalist published a book, which included sketches and statements by two women who had served at the communications center during the war. His suggestion to excavate the bunker was dismissed. In 2007 the historical communications journal of the city of Vienna published a review article on the construction of the bunker.
