= Kuffner Observatory =

Observatory in Vienna

Coordinates: 48°12′45″N 16°17′28″E

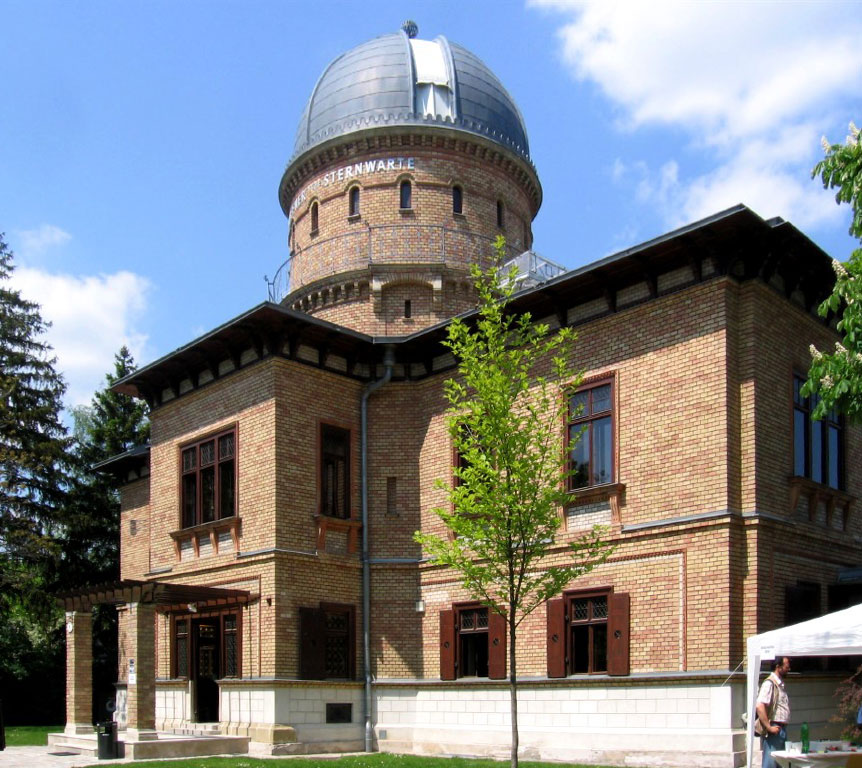
The Kuffner observatory's main building with the telescope dome

The Kuffner observatory is one of two telescope-equipped public astronomical observatories situated in Austria's capital, Vienna. It is situated in the West of the city's Ottakring district, on the slope of the Gallitzinberg at 302 m altitude. Originally a private research institution, it was converted into an educational astronomy facility after World War II as buildings and city lights had encroached to a degree that severely hampered scientific nightsky observations. Today the main tasks of the observatory consist in public education on astronomy, operating and preserving the historical equipment, and minor projects in scientific astronomy.

The observatory was noted for its work on photometry, conducted by astronomer Karl Schwarzschild, star catalogs, and the determining of distances to other stars. The observatory has several astronomical instruments of historical interest, including a noted heliometer and large meridian circle, and also a vertical circle.

The observatory's first observations were made in 1886.

== Scientific achievements ==
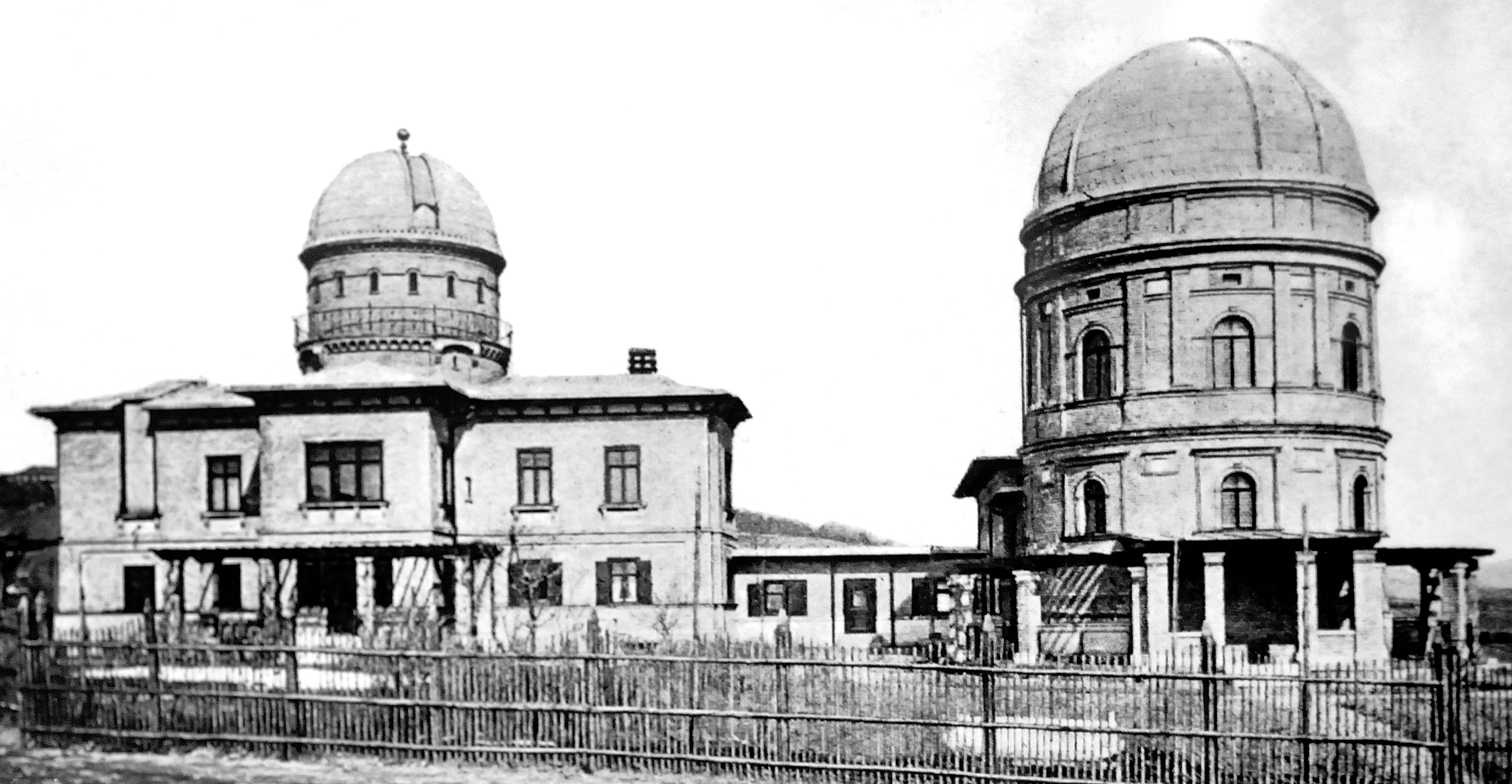
The Kuffner observatory in 1891, immediately after its extension

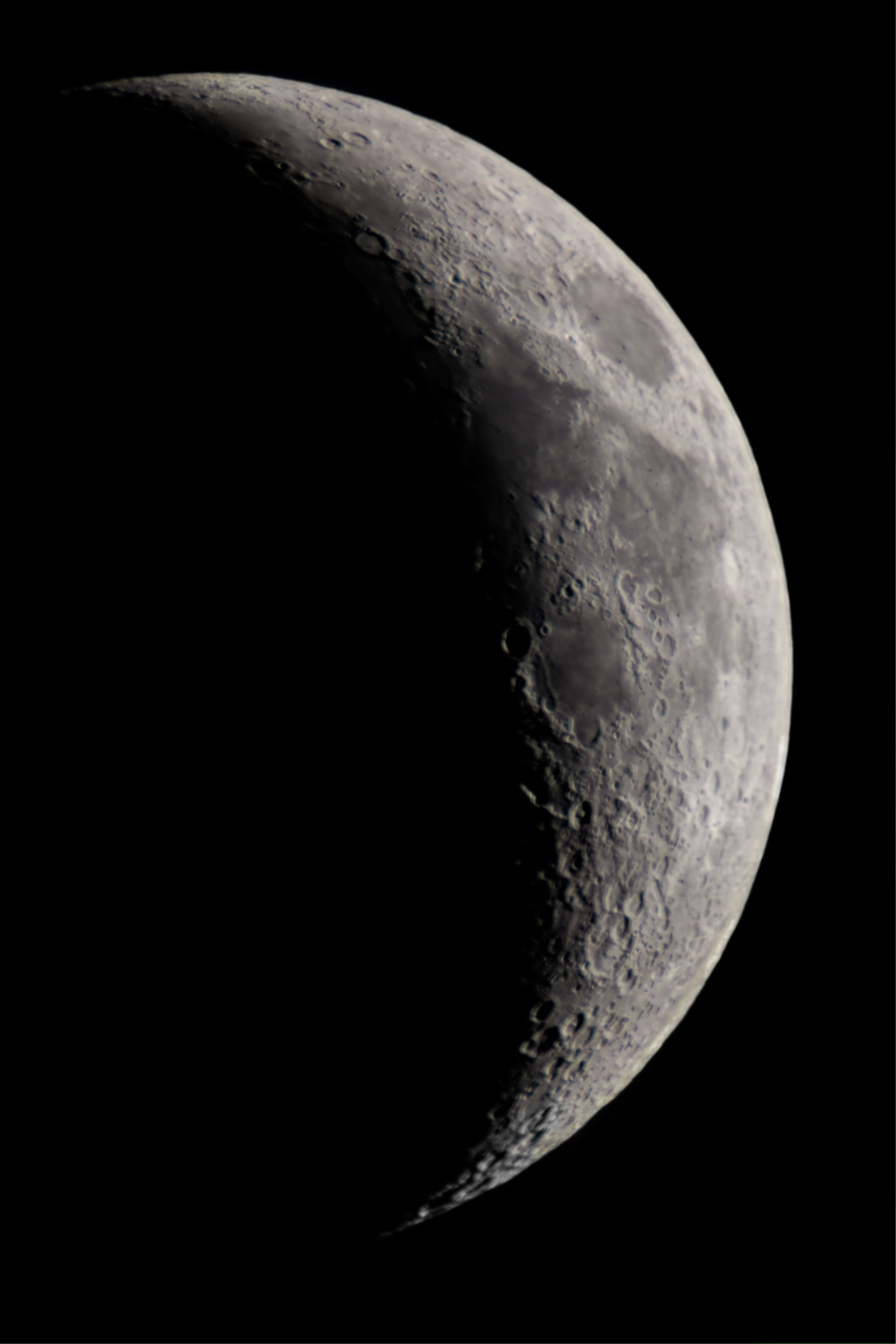
Modern astrophotograph of the moon with the Kuffner refractor (27 cm ~10.6 inch)

The Kuffner observatory was constructed from 1884-1886 according to plans of Franz Ritter von Neumann. Originally it was a private research institution for which the philanthropic head of the Kuffner brewery dynasty from Lundenburg, Moriz von Kuffner financed the construction (including extensions built in 1889-1890), the equipment, and also the operation.

During the years leading up to World War I the observatory became one of the most important astronomy sites in the Austro-Hungarian monarchy, and established a considerable international reputation. Carl Wilhelm Wirtz, Leo Anton Karl de Ball, Samuel Oppenheim, and most notably Karl Schwarzschild spent parts of their careers here. During his assistantship at the Kuffner observatory, Schwarzschild – who would later become the “grandfather of black hole theory”—developed a formula that allowed to calculate the relation between the intensity of faint astronomical light sources, the exposure time, and the degree of opacity created in photographic emulsions.

Schwarzschild is noted for his work on advancing photographic photometry.

== Demise and reactivation ==
The financial situation of the Kuffner dynasty deteriorated with the onset of World War I. The observatory was closed in 1915 and, after several failed attempts, compounded by persecution of the Jewish Kuffners after the Anschluss of Austria to the Third Reich, was reopened only in 1947. The Vienna city council acquired the facility in 1987, and initiated a total refurbishment that lasted from 1989 to 1995 when it was reopened to the public under the direction of the Folk high school Ottakring as an institution for public education, a Volkssternwarte.

== Historical equipment ==
The Kuffner observatory maintains four major pieces of observation equipment from the late 19th century in working condition: the 270 mm refracting telescope, built in 1884, to which a 156 mm astrograph (now used with modern CCD imagers) was added in 1890; the 132 mm meridian circle, the largest meridian passage instrument of the Austro-Hungarian Empire; its ancillary vertical circle instrument, one of the few that still exist at European observatories; and the 217/3000 mm heliometer, the largest of its type that was ever built.

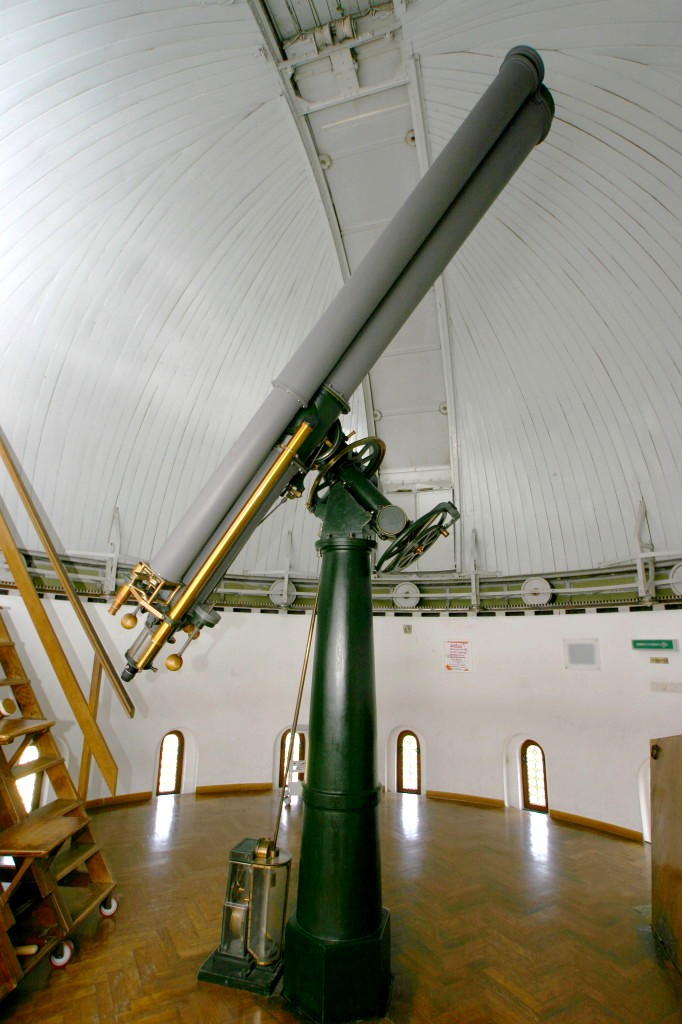
The refractor

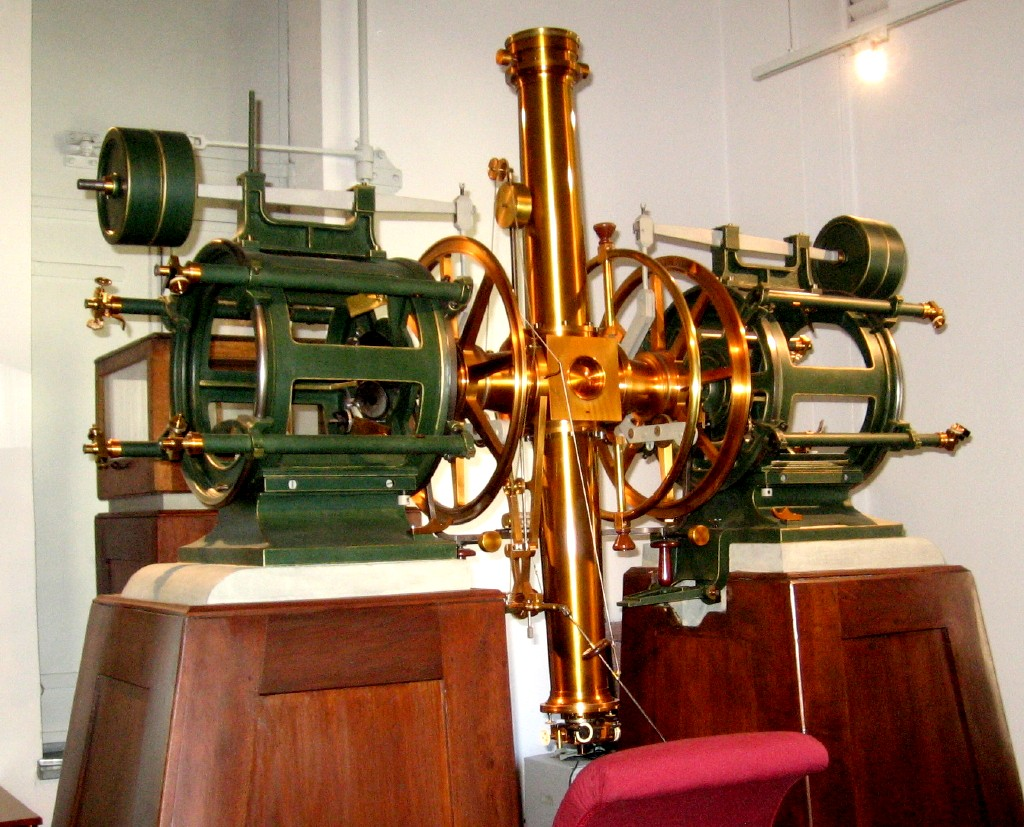
The meridian circle

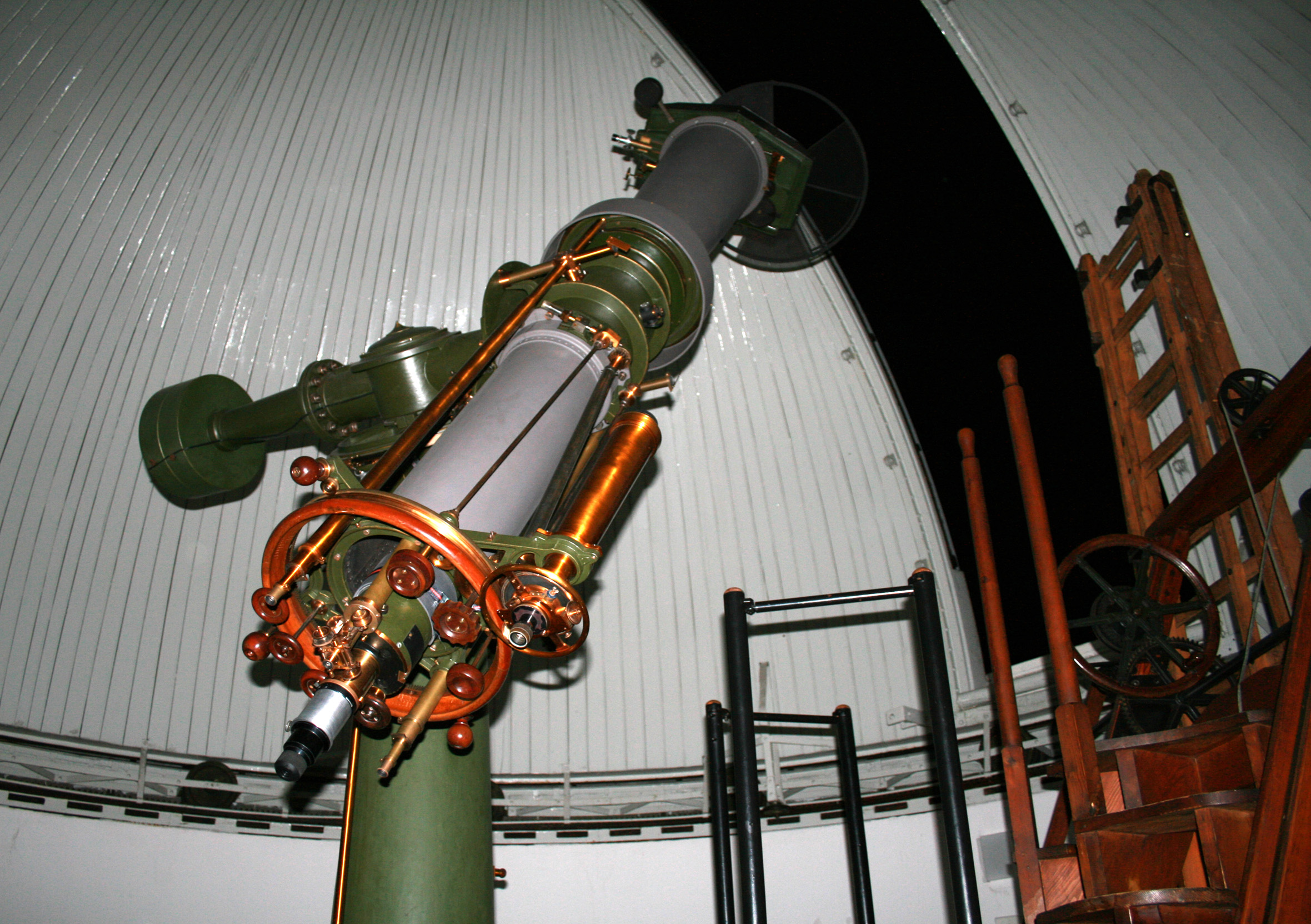
The heliometer

The heliometer was designed for measuring tiny distances, and could be used for measuring the distance to other stars by trigonometric parallax. The instrument was installed in 1896, and by 1910 it had computed 16 parallax distances to other stars, out only 108 total known to science at that time.

The meridian circle (i.e. transit-type instrument) can record the locations of the things in the sky, and also be used to calculate a local time. The instrument type was very important in the old observatories, and had to do with time, the geography of the Earth, and the location of things in the sky.

The great refractor is a double telescope, with a primary of 270 mm (27 cm) aperture objective lens, and was built by Repsold and also Steinheill; it was installed at the observatory in 1886.

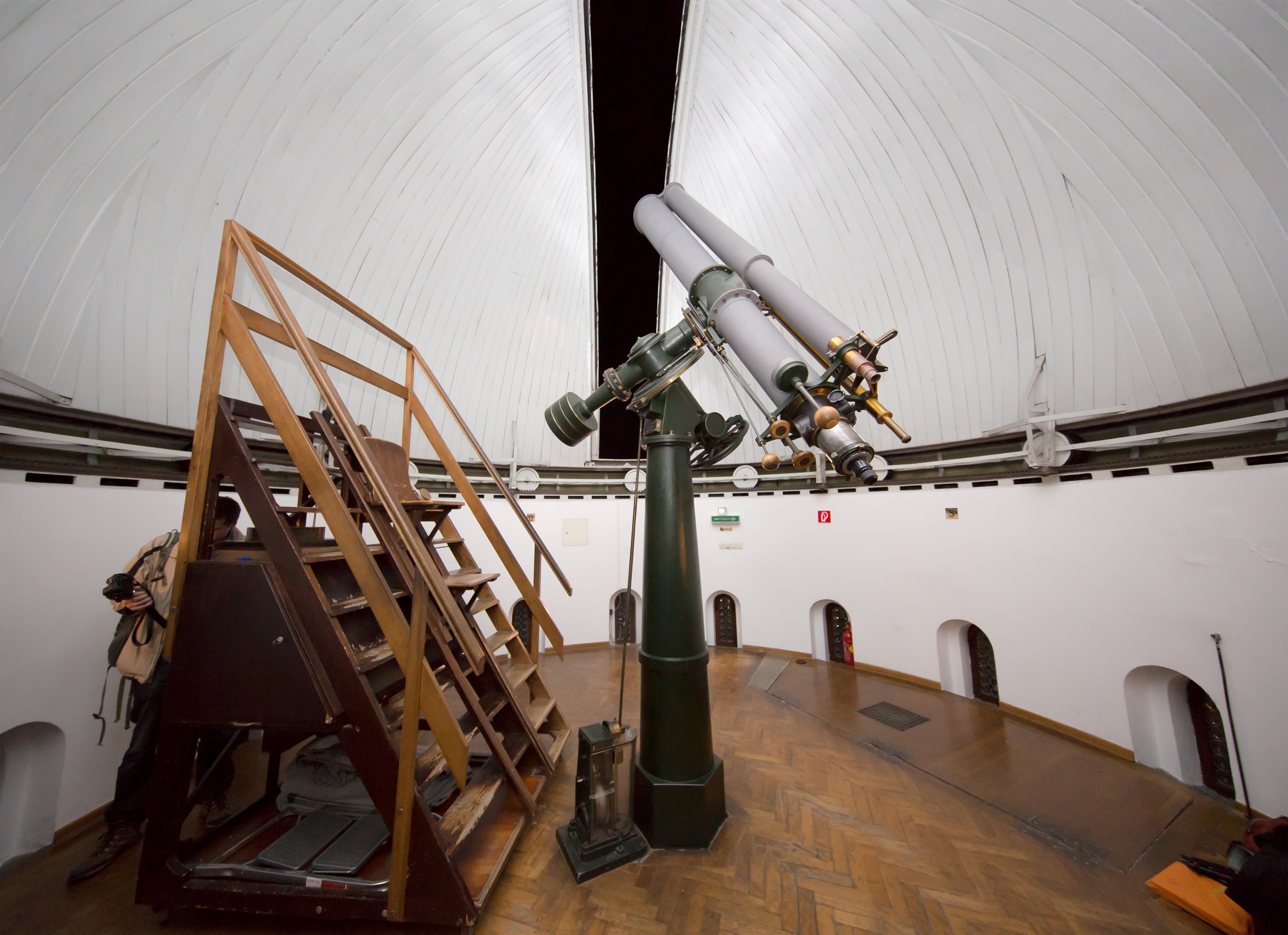
The double refractor of Kuffner

The observatory also has some other astronomical instruments, and an Urban No.18 pendulum clock. The clock would often be used in conjunction with other astronomical instruments.

== Current research ==
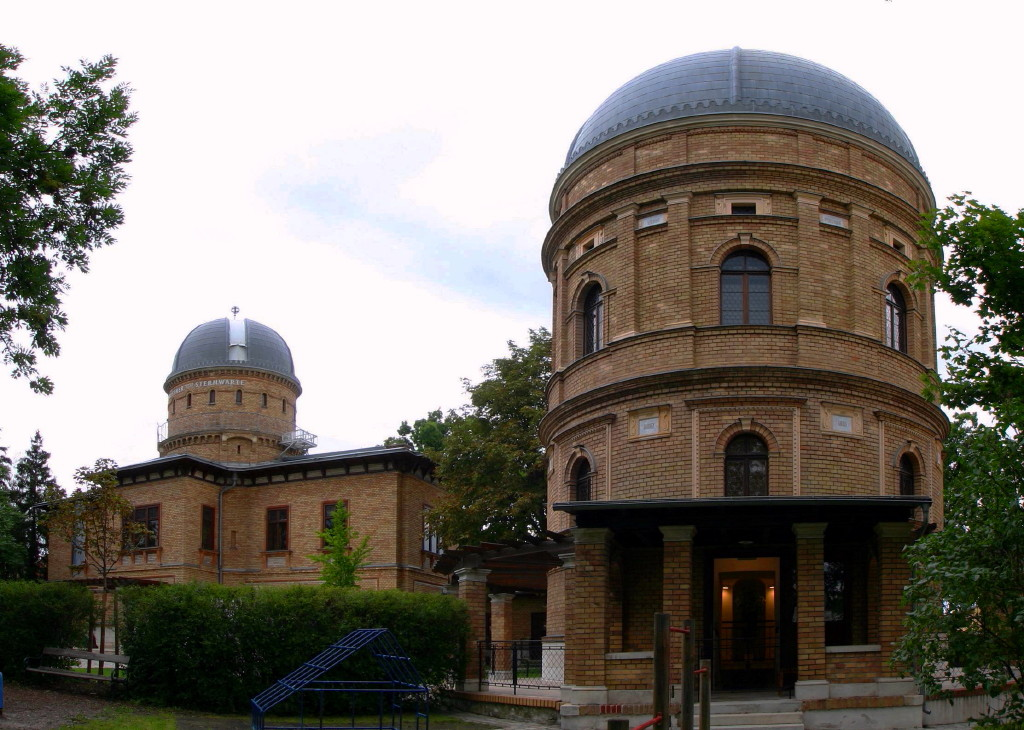
Kuffner Observatory, 2008

Besides its function as a scientific museum and its ongoing mission concerning popularization of astronomy, the Kuffner observatory serves as the Austrian national host for the INES (International Ultraviolet Explorer New Extracted Spectra) database. It hosted the Meeting on Asteroids and Comets in Europe (MACE) in 2006, and the DARKSKY European Symposium, an event of the Dark-sky movement, in 2008. The current director is the Austrian physicist and author Werner Gruber.

== Architecture ==
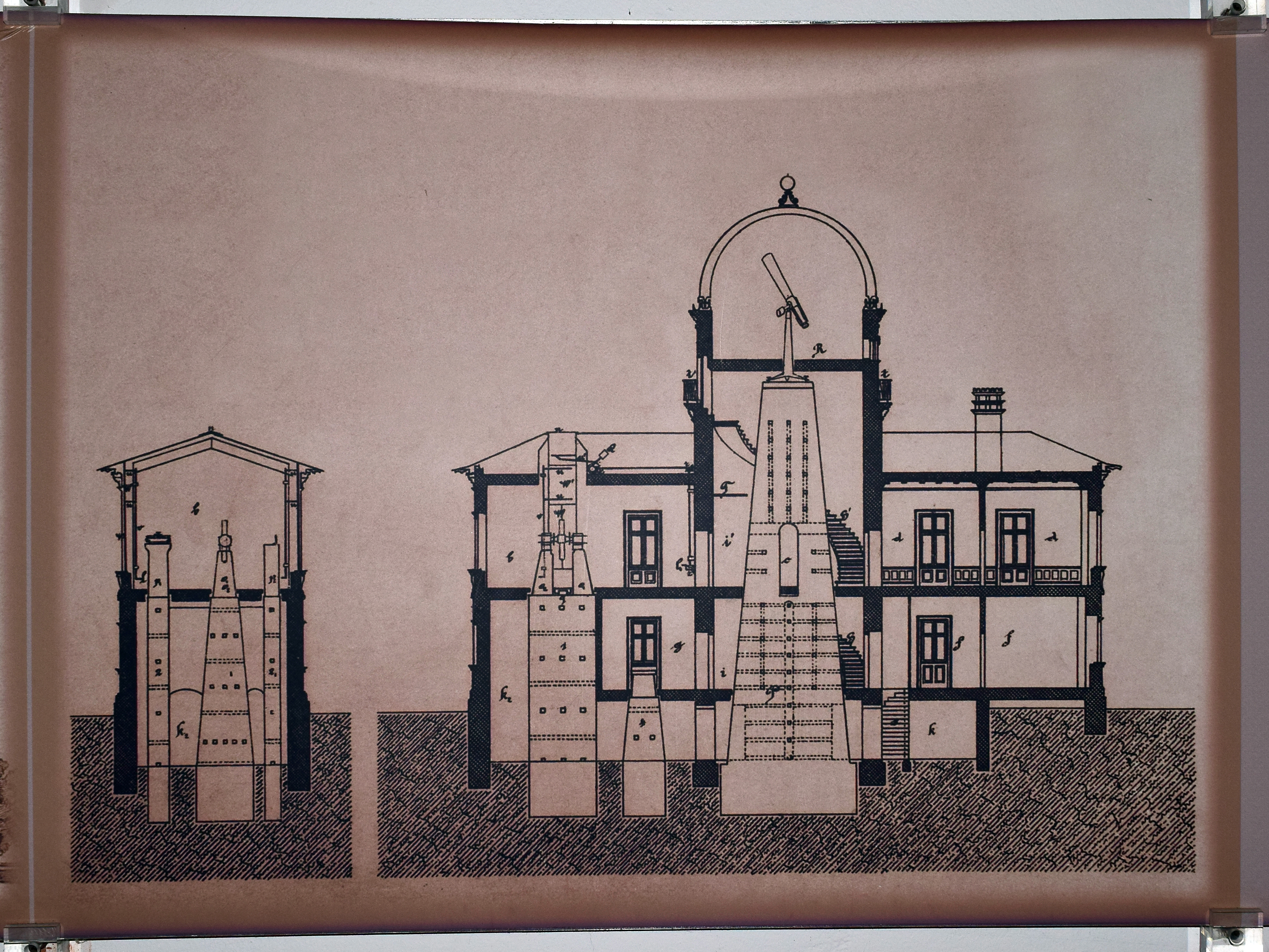
1886 plan for the observatory: This cross-sectional view shows how the instrument pillars have their own foundation piers compared to the building's walls.

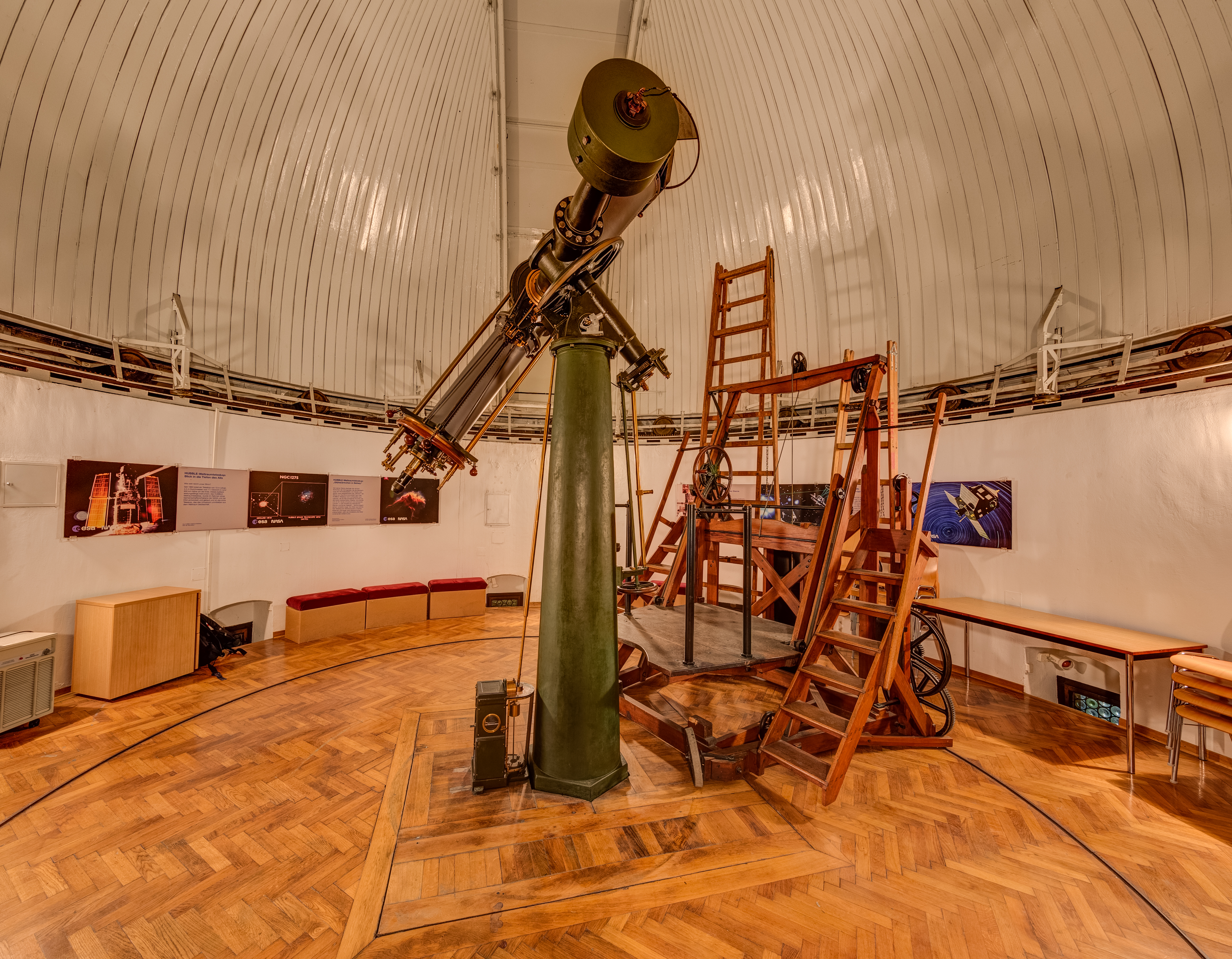
Interior of the heliometer dome

== See also ==
- List of astronomical observatories
- List of astronomical societies
- Lists of telescopes
