= Samuel Oppenheim =

Austrian astronomer (1857–1928)

Samuel Oppenheim (19 November 1857 in Braunsberg – 15 August 1928 in Vienna) was an Austrian astronomer.

In 1875, Oppenheim began to study mathematics, physics and astronomy in Vienna. He took his Staatsexamen in 1880. From 1881–1887, he worked at the Observatory of Vienna and from 1888–1896 at the Kuffner observatory in Vienna. He attained the Doctorate in 1884 and the Habilitation in 1910 for theoretical astronomy. After working as a teacher in Prague, he was Professor ordinarius for astronomy at the University of Vienna.

Oppenheim's field of research was mainly in the field of celestial mechanics (for example he wrote works on comets, Gravitation, Precession, Kinematics and statistics of stars etc.). He was co-editor of the Astronomy section of Enzyklopädie der mathematischen Wissenschaften.

== Publications ==
- Oppenheim, S. (1919–1922). "Astronomie". Encyklopädie der Mathematischen Wissenschaften mit Einschluss Ihrer Anwendungen. 6.2.1.
- Oppenheim, S. (1919–1922). "Astronomie". Encyklopädie der Mathematischen Wissenschaften mit Einschluss Ihrer Anwendungen. 6.2.2.
