= Palais Kuffner =

Coordinates: 48°12′49″N 16°19′23″E

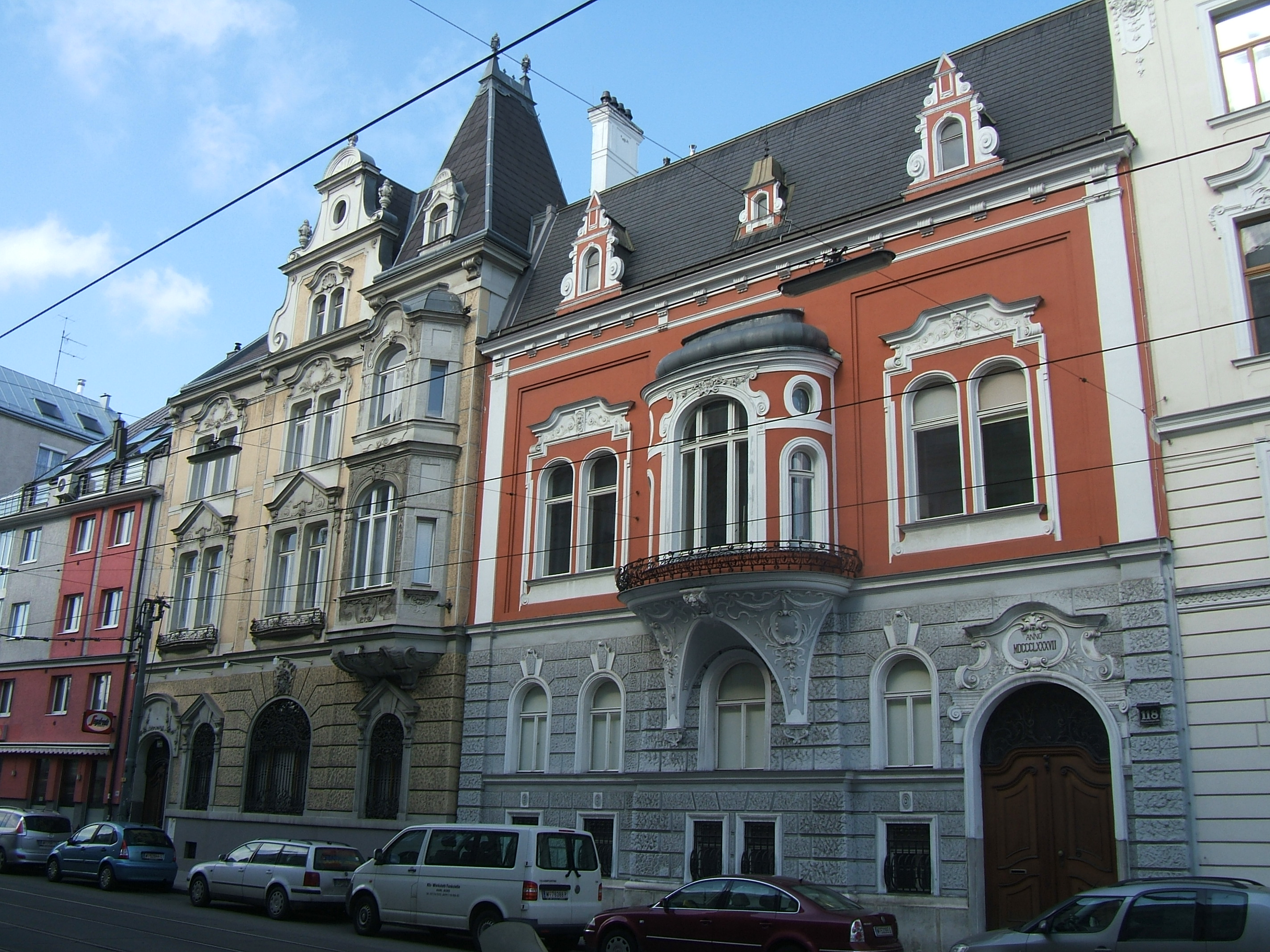
Palais Kuffner in Vienna 16th district, Ottakringerstraße 118-120

The Palais Kuffner is a city-palace in Vienna that was built for the brewery barons von Kuffner. It is located in Ottakring, the 16th district of Vienna.

The palace consists of two adjacent buildings that were constructed in quick succession, yet each received its own individual façade. No. 118 was built between 1886 and 1888, and No. 120 followed in 1892/93 for the brewery owner Moritz von Kuffner. The plans were drawn up by Franz von Neumann, and the executed by Anton Adolf Zagorski.

== Description ==
No. 118:

A tall rusticated base zone extends up to nearly half the height of the façade. Starting with rectangular, barred basement windows, four bays with round-arched windows, simple window framings, and prominently sculpted keystones lie above a continuous sill course. A round-arched portal is placed to the side, adorned with volutes, an entablature, a curved round-arched pediment, and the date "1887." From a central projection that reaches up to the string course, a convex, segmentally arched bay window with Baroque-inspired decoration emerges. The bel étage stands out visually through its coloring – terracotta and white – forming a strong visual accent. The side double windows are unified by stepped stucco panels, white window frames with "ears" (a type of molding), console hoods, and Baroque-style lintel panels.

No. 120:

This building is notable for the vertical tripartition of its sand-colored façade. The rusticated base is recessed in depth. The central section is dominated by a large round-arched window with a keystone. The side windows are narrower and topped with triangular pediments featuring beautiful wrought-iron grilles. A segmental-arched portal marks the outer edge. Rising pilaster strips visually unify the two upper floors. The double windows, framed by stucco panels, feature either broken pediments on the bel étage or curved segmental pediments on the floor above. The right section of the building, slightly set forward and equipped with a two-story bay window, resembles a tower, a perception reinforced by its tented roof. The central part is topped with a tall gable adorned with volutes and vases.
