= Schloss Wilhelminenberg =

Coordinates: 48°13′10″N 16°17′7″E

Wilhelminenberg Castle
- Schloß Wilhelminenberg
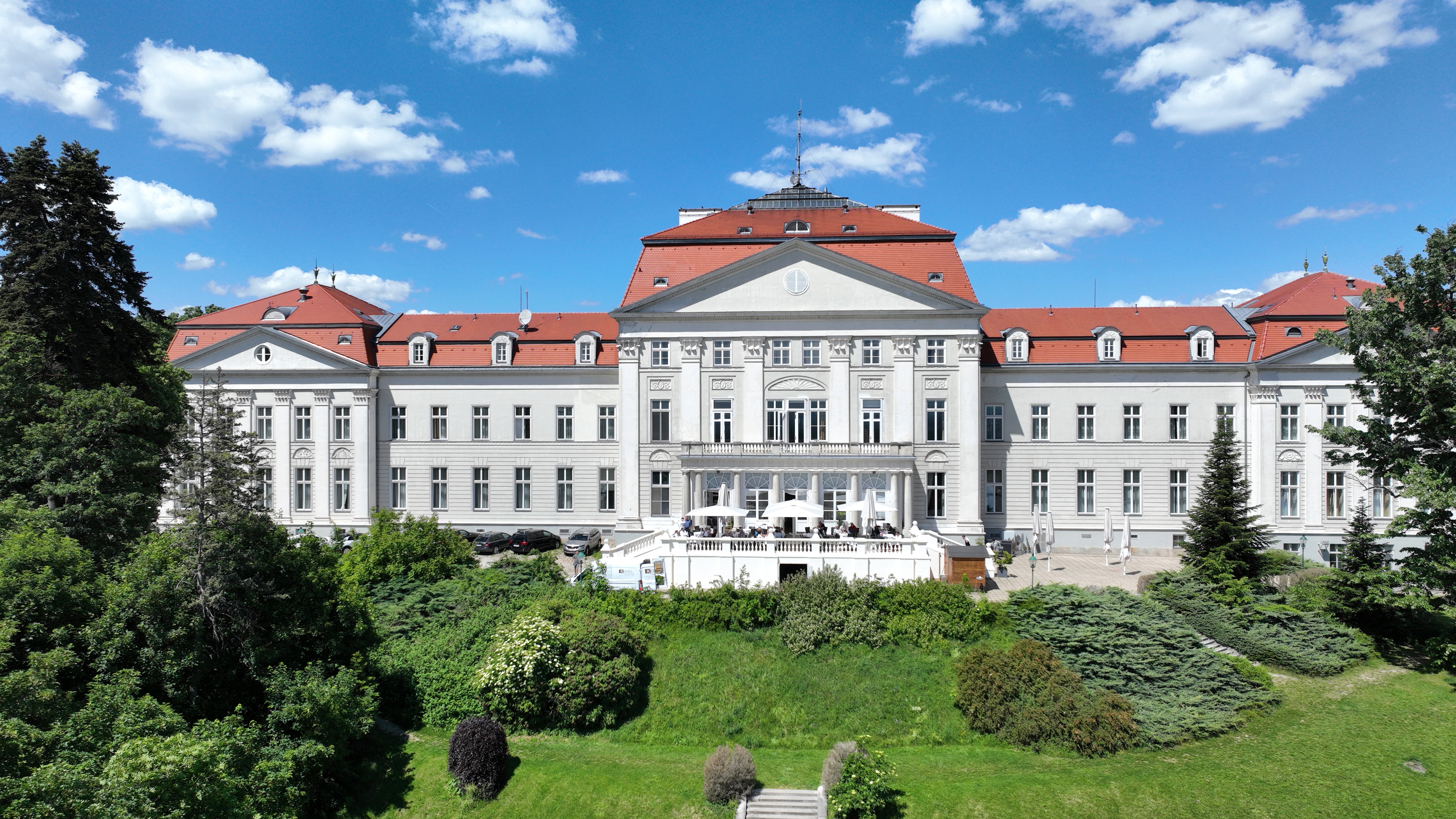

- Location within Vienna

General information
- Architectural style: Second Empire style
- Location: Gallitzinberg, Vienna, Austria
- Year built: 1908

Design and construction
- Architects: Eduard Frauenfeld and Ignaz Sowinski

Wilhelminenberg Castle (German: Schloß Wilhelminenberg) is a former palace dating from the early 20th century, which is now a four-star hotel, restaurant and conference facility. It is situated on the eastern slopes of the Gallitzinberg, in the Wienerwald western parts of the Austrian capital, Vienna.

== History ==
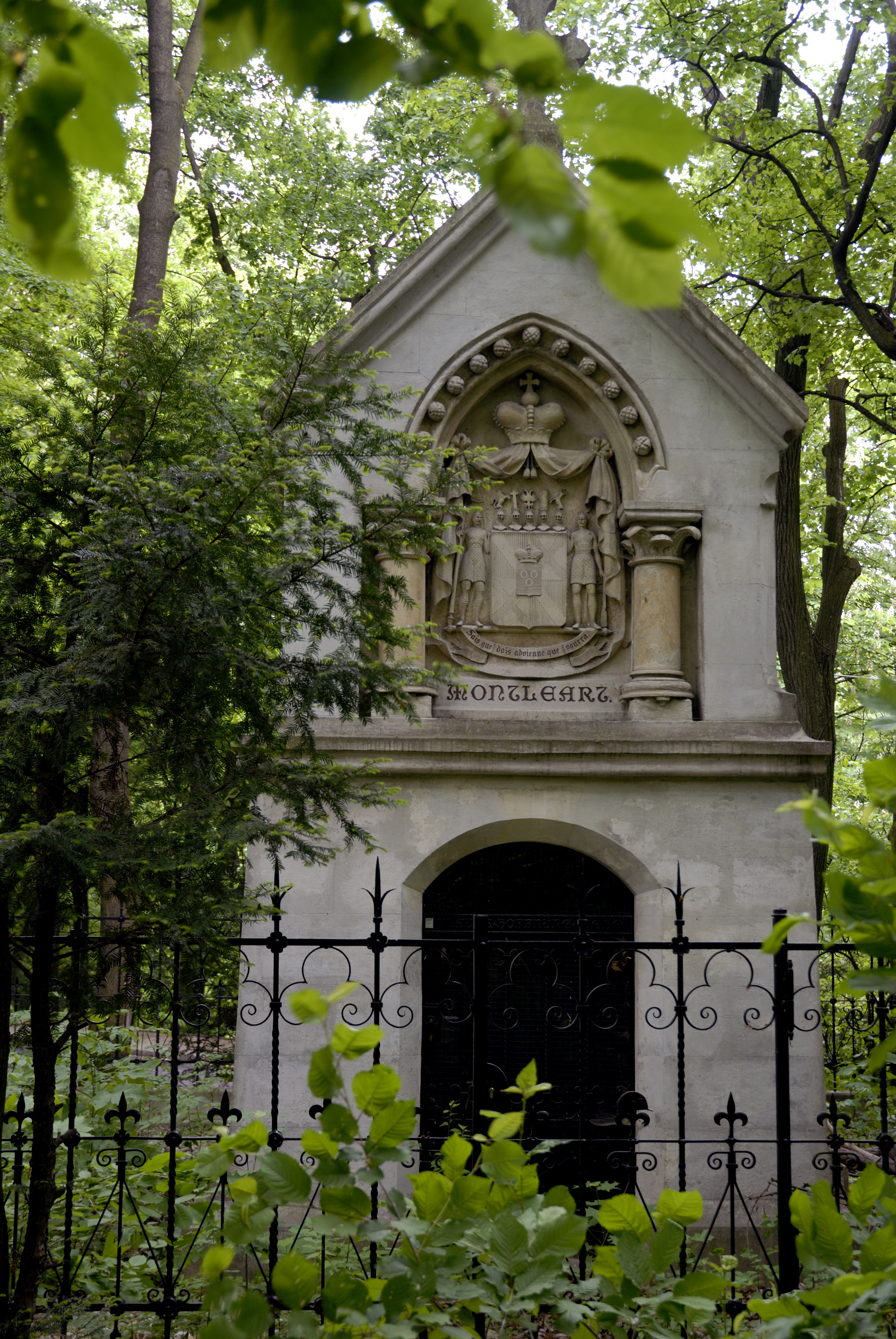
The Montléart mausoleum

In 1780, Prince Dmitri Mikhailovich Galitzin, the Russian ambassador in Vienna, acquired forested property from Field Marshal Count Franz Moritz von Lacy, situated uphill of what was then the village of Ottakring. He ordered a small Jagdschloss to be erected, which soon became famous for its social events. By 1824, when the building was already in disrepair, ownership of the estate had passed on to Prince Julius de Montléart (1787–1865) and his wife Princess Maria Christina of Saxony. In 1838, the castle was expanded by adding two side wings.

When Julius' son, Prince Moritz de Montléart, acquired the property after considerable legal battles, he gave it to his wife Wilhelmine (née von Arnold) and named the castle "Wilhelminenberg". Upon their deaths in 1887 and 1895, respectively, both were interred in a small mausoleum which was built in the "neo-gothic" style close to the castle. Because of her generosity towards the poor, Wilhelmine de Montléart became known as the "Angel of Ottakring." In 1895, their nephew Archduke Rainer Ferdinand of Austria, son of the half-sister of Moritz de Montleart, inherited the estate.

In 1903, Archduke Leopold Salvator had the dilapidated building demolished and in the years to 1908, a palace in the Second Empire style was built according to plans of the architects Eduard Frauenfeld and Ignaz Sowinski. The construction costs, including the park and the ancillary buildings, amounted to 1.4 million Kronen.

In 1918, when World War I drew to its close, the castle became a military hospital and was subsequently used as a rehabilitation center for veterans. In 1927, the City of Vienna purchased the entire estate from the Zurich banker Wilhelm Ammann and established an orphanage there. From 1934 to 1938, the castle served as the home base for the world-famous Vienna Boys' Choir.

Following Austria's Anschluss to Nazi Germany in March 1938, Wilhelminenberg was confiscated and transferred to the Österreichische Legion, a paramilitary unit of exiled Austrian National Socialists. During World War II, it was once again made an army hospital. When the war had ended, the City of Vienna used parts of the building to accommodate former concentration camp inmates, and again as an orphanage. A special education facility for girls with behavioral problems was operated from the 1950s until 1977. After that, representation rooms were opened on special occasions such as the annual Vienna Festival, but in general, little use was made of the castle until 1988, when it was reopened as a hotel.

Since May 2003, Wilhelminenberg ranks as a four-star hotel. It boasts 87 elegant rooms, a restaurant and library, a terrace offering a panoramic view of Vienna, and a 120,000 m^{2} park. Conferences with up to 2,000 participants can be accommodated.

Wilhelminenberg has become a popular location for large wedding parties and other celebrations. On such occasions, splendid fireworks are frequently visible across the western parts of Vienna. In winter, a section of the park can be used for skating.

In 2011, several former inmates of the castle reported massive and systematic cases of child abuse during the time the castle was used as an orphanage for girls. The allegations include widespread beatings, systematic rape, and even murder. The Vienna city authorities conducted an investigation that lasted six years, and was essentially concluded in 2016, with cumulated settlement payments to victims amounting to €52.5 million.

== Sources ==
Klusacek C, Stimmer K: Ottakring. Vom Brunnenmarkt zum Liebhartstal. pp. 121–124. Kurt Mohl Verlag, Vienna 1983. ISBN 3-900272-37-9
