= Gallitzinberg =

Coordinates: 48°13′17″N 16°15′56″E

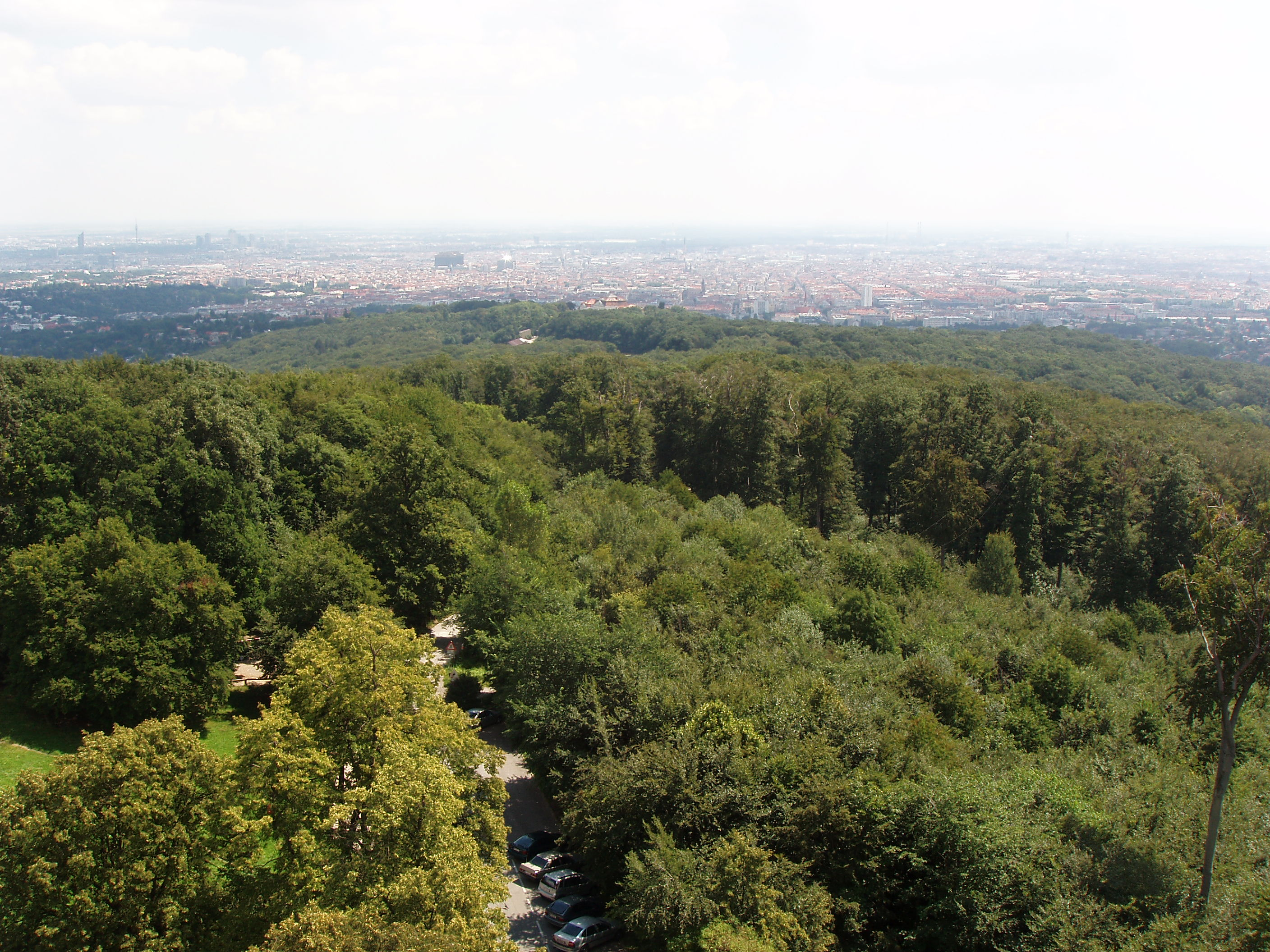
View across Vienna from the observation tower at the summit of the Gallitzinberg

The Gallitzinberg (449 m) is a forested hill in the West of Austria's capital, Vienna. While it is relatively inconspicuous in the broader context of the Northeastern end of the Wienerwald mountain range, it is nevertheless remarkable because of its multifaceted history, and because it functions as an important recreational area in the Western uphill part of the densely populated Ottakring district.

The Eastern slopes of the Gallitzinberg are dominated by mansions that date from the 19th or early 20th century, and are among the best residential areas of Vienna.

== Origin of the name ==
The name Gallitzinberg traces to Prince Dmitri Mikhailovich Galitzin, a Russian ambassador to Vienna who in 1780 acquired forested real estate from Field Marshal Count Franz Moritz von Lacy, situated uphill and West of what was then the small village of Ottakring. Originally the area had been named Predigtstuhl which, literally translated, means “preachers' seat”. This refers to a religious procession which during the 18th century was held annually on May 1, and concluded with a mass held at an ancient oak tree.

A 19th century owner, Prince Moritz de Montléart, stepbrother of Charles Albert of Sardinia, gave the estate to his wife Wilhelmine Montléart-Sachsen-Curland. This authorities refused his wish to have the mountain officially renamed Wilhelminenberg, but his subsequent efforts to establish the name in colloquial use were successful. The local population now uses the terms Wilhelminenberg and Gallitzinberg synonymously, occasionally along with the old name, Predigtstuhl.

== Significant buildings ==
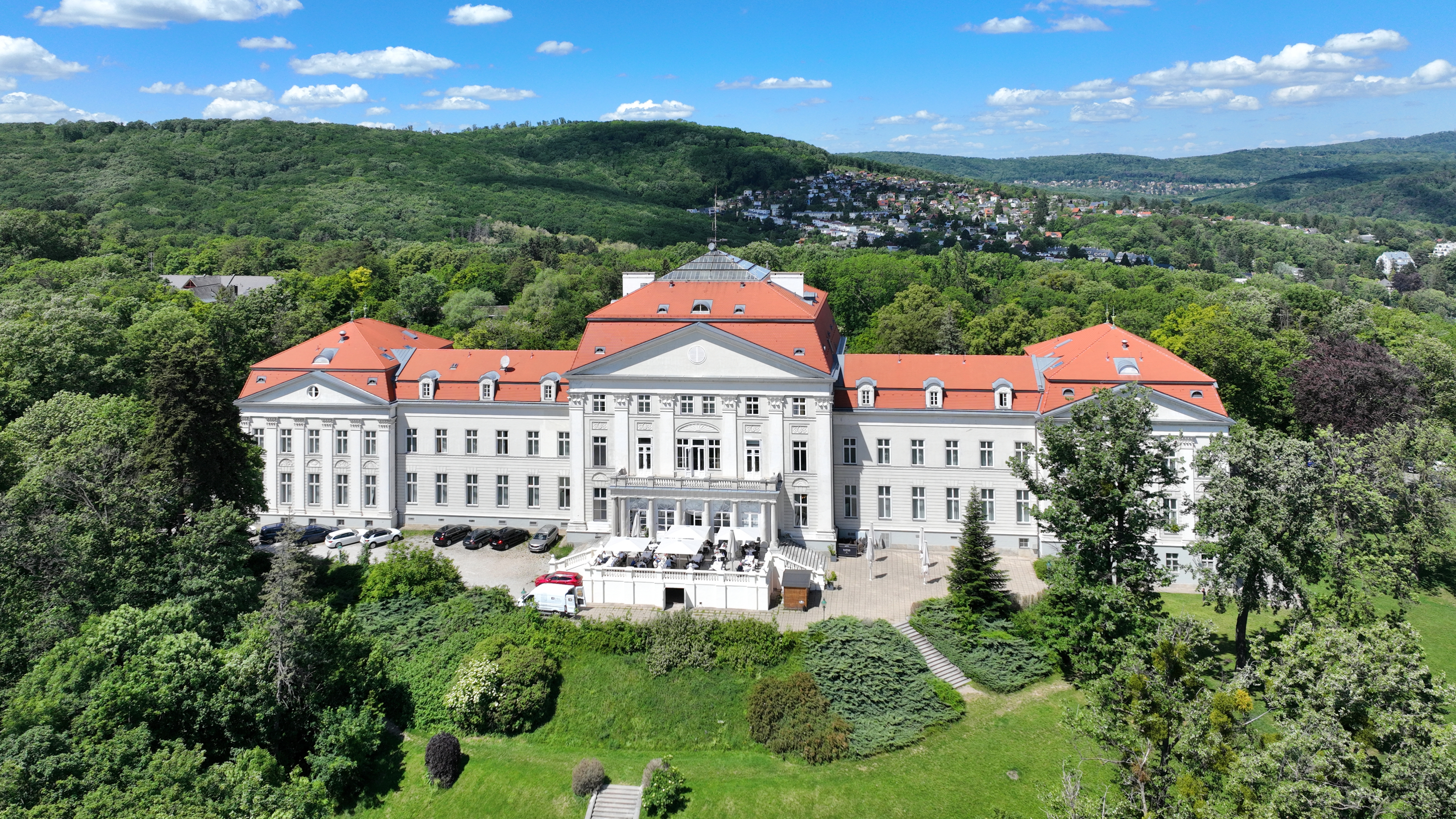
Wilhelminenberg Palace

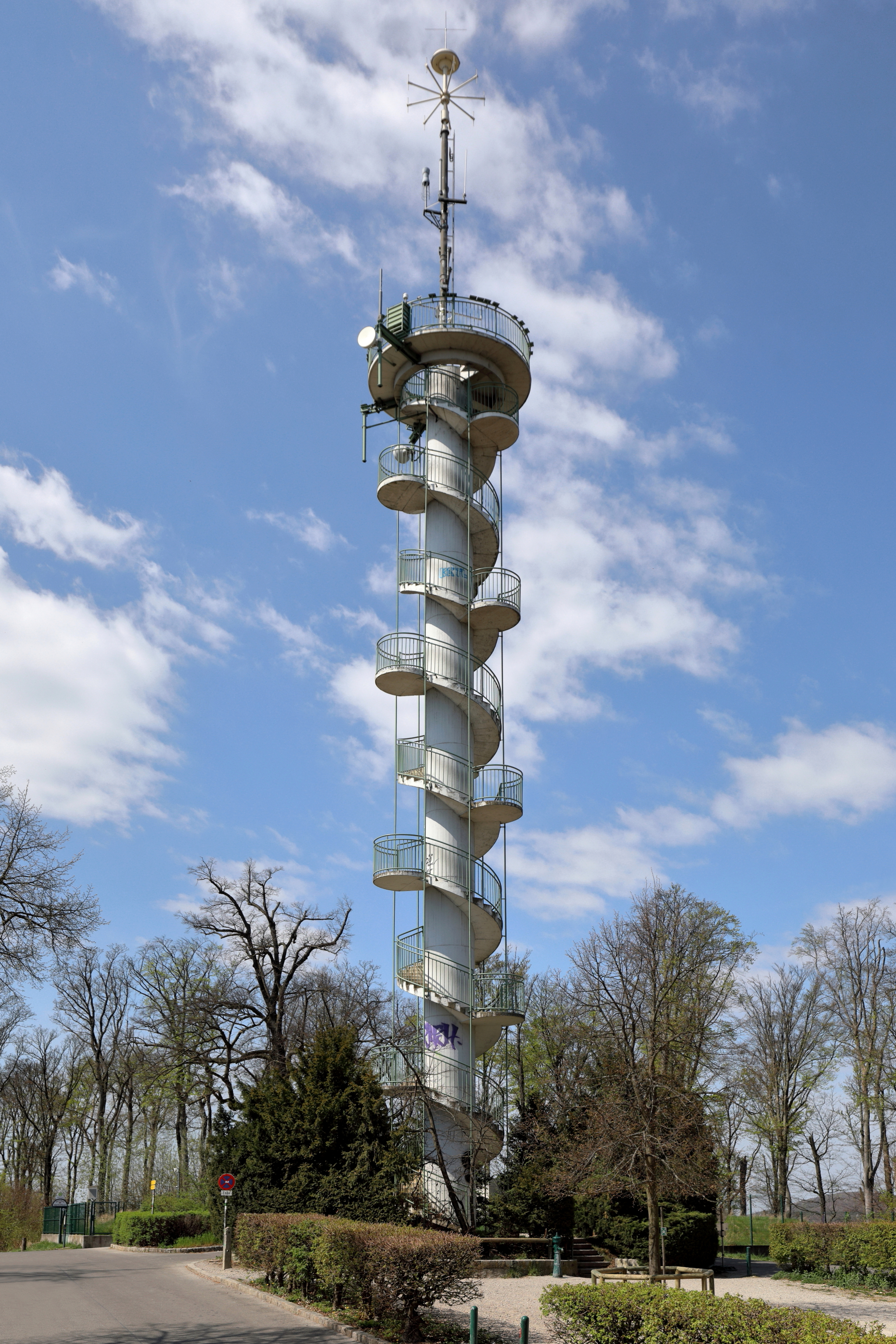
Jubiläumswarte

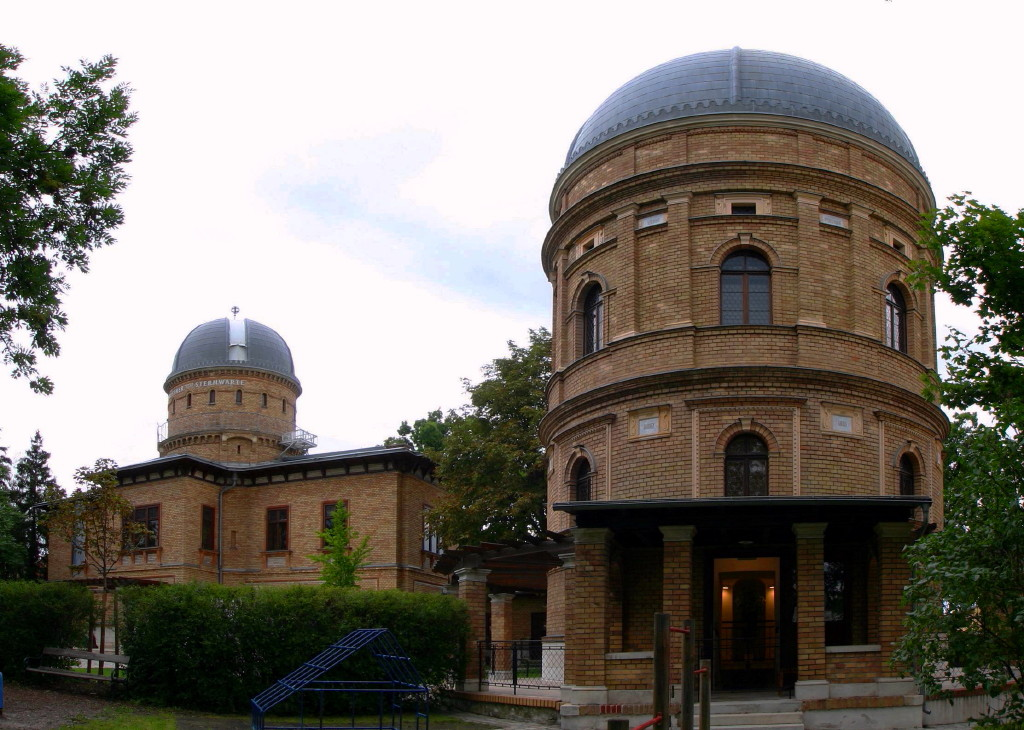
The Kuffner observatory

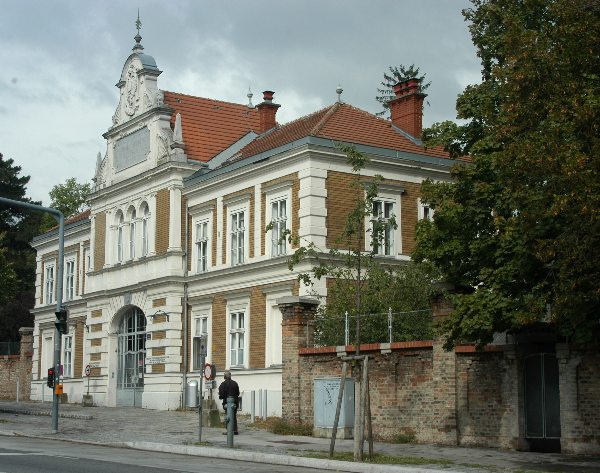
The Wilhelminenspital, one of Vienna's major hospitals

Schloss Wilhelminenberg, an imperial palace from the early 20th century, dominates the cityward shoulder of the hill. It faces the Konrad Lorenz Institute for Ethology, now managed by the Austrian Academy of Sciences. The founder of ethology, Irenäus Eibl-Eibesfeldt worked here as a research associate from 1946 to 1948 when it was still the private Biological Station Wilhelminenberg. Immediately next to it is the Research Institute for Wildlife Ecology which belongs to the University of Veterinary Medicine Vienna. Further to the South and downhill are the Kuffner observatory which offers the public opportunities for stargazing; and where the hill rolls eastward into the basin of Vienna one finds the Wilhelminenspital, one of Vienna's major hospitals. Also of note is the Liebhartstaler Bockkeller, originally a restaurant in the vicinity of Ottakring's cemetery (which in itself is a remarkable feature of the Gallitzinberg slope) and today a home to a congregation dedicated to Viennese traditional music.

At the summit of the Gallitzinberg is an observation tower which in 1956 replaced an older steel construction that had been erected in 1899 in commemoration of the 50th anniversary of emperor Franz Joseph I's ascendancy to the Austrian throne. Therefore, the present tower is still colloquially known as the Jubiläumswarte (“jubilee tower”). Its topmost platform, 31 meters above ground, offers a panorama of Vienna. On very clear days one can see for more than 60 kilometers, to the Slovak Little Carpathians beyond the city in the East, and to the Schneeberg, Lower Austria's highest mountain, in the South. Next to the tower it is a small facility dedicated to the education of Vienna's schoolchildren in the fundamentals of forest biology. Also in the immediate vicinity, but with few remains visible above ground, is the legacy of the Gaugefechtsstand Wien, a Wehrmacht command and control bunker which during the later years of World War II coordinated air alarms and aerial defense for Vienna and its surroundings.
