= La Correspondencia =

La Correspondencia may refer to:

- La Correspondencia (newspaper), a Puerto Rican newspaper
- La Correspondencia de España, a Spanish newspaper published from 1859 to 1925
- La Correspondencia Militar, a Spanish newspaper published from 1877 to 1932
