= Claro Abánades López =

Spanish journalist, publisher, historian and Carlist activist

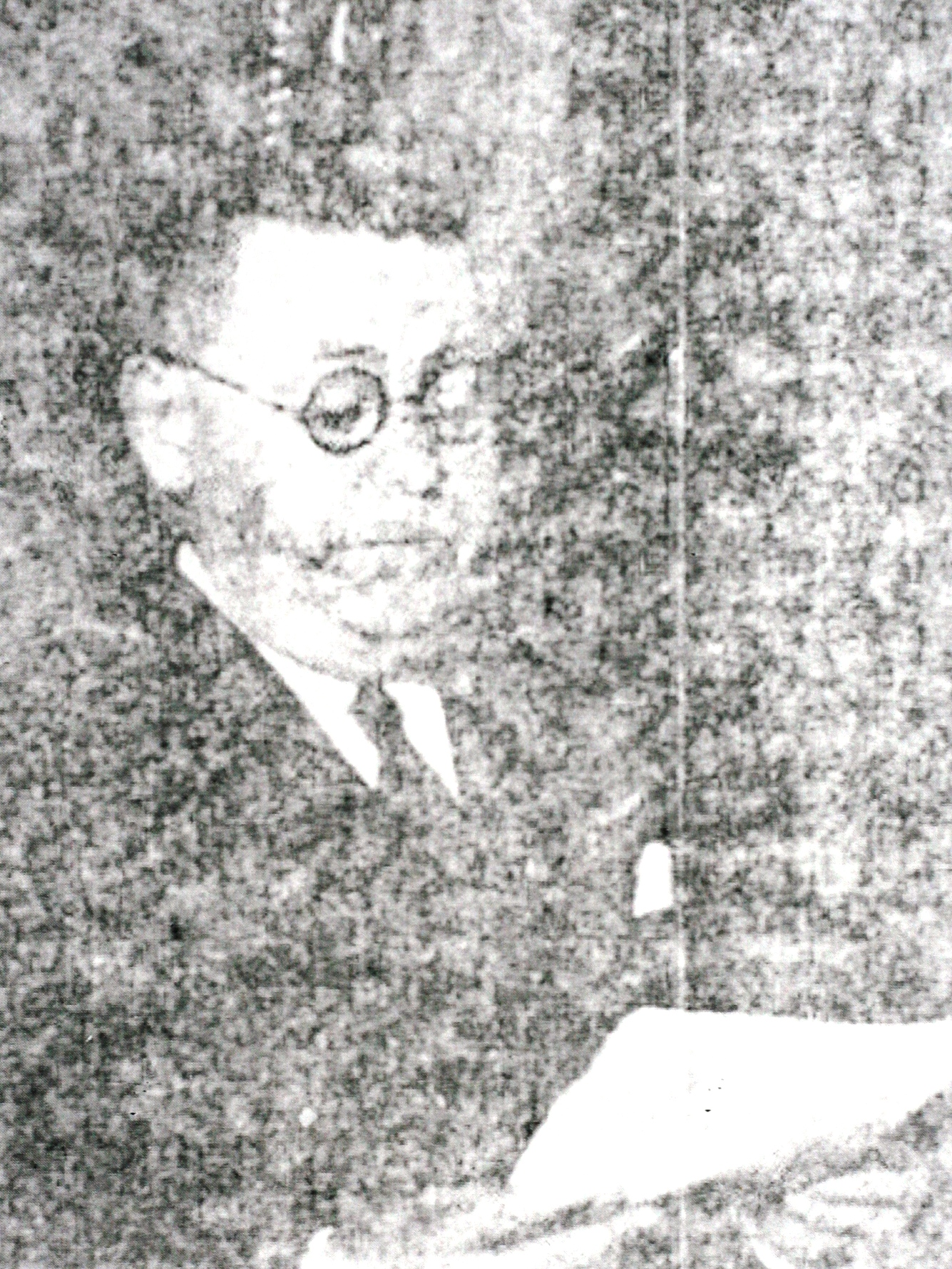
- Born: Claro Abánades López; 12 August 1879; Molina de Aragón, Spain
- Died: 16 December 1973 (aged 94); Madrid, Spain
- Occupation: publisher
- Known for: journalist
- Political party: Comunión Tradicionalista

Claro Abánades López (12 August 1879 – 16 December 1973) was a Spanish journalist, publisher, historian and a Carlist activist. His career of a journalist lasted over 70 years (1897–1969), though he is rather known as author of studies on history of Alcarria and as editor of monumental multi-volume series of Juan Vázquez de Mella works.

== Family and youth ==
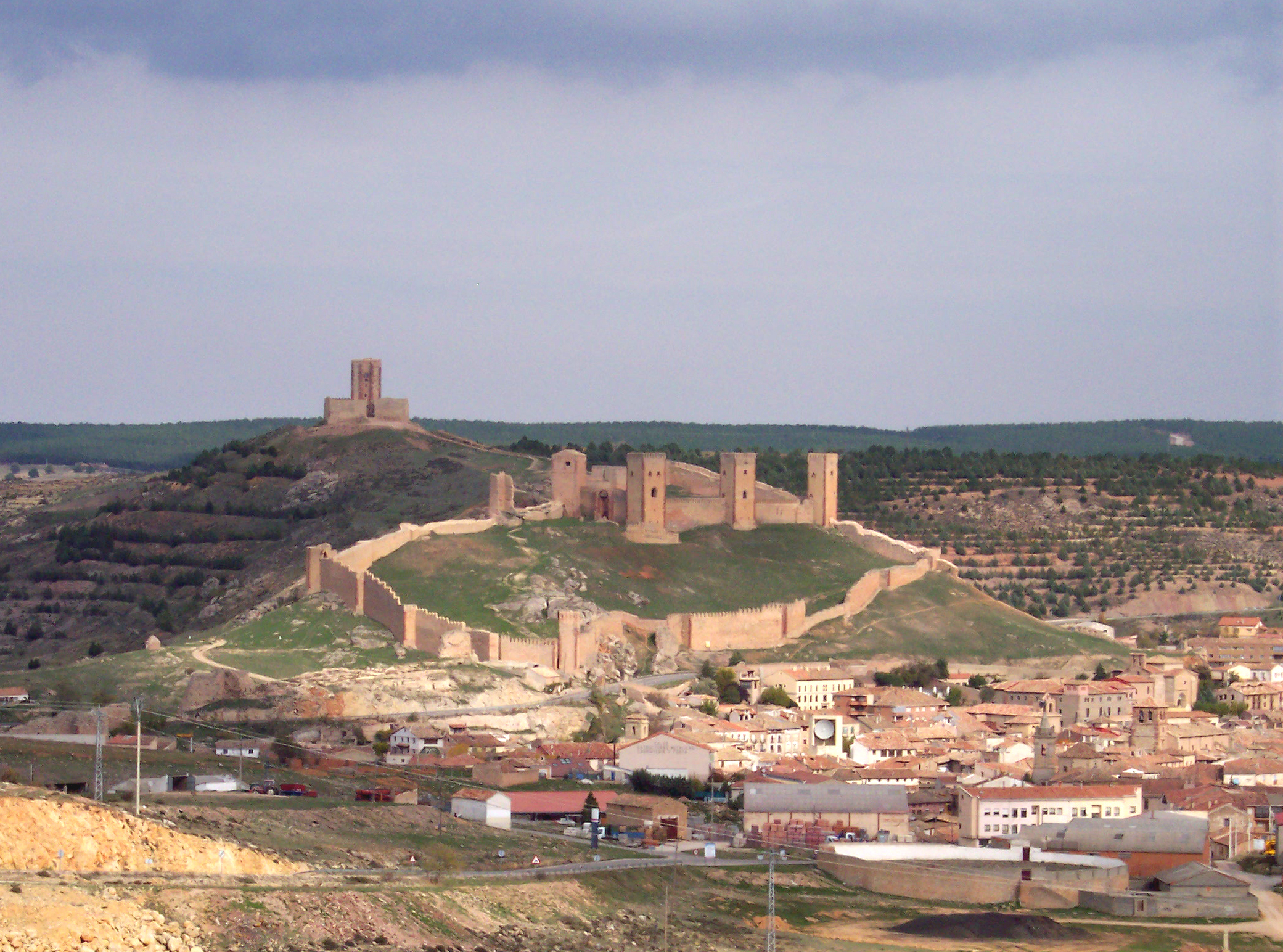
Molina de Aragón

Claro Abánades López was born to a working class family from Alcarria, a natural region covering mostly what is now the province of Guadalajara. His father, Pedro Abánades Jiménez (1847–1907), was a construction contractor. Little is known about his mother, Antonia López del Rey. The couple had 5 children, Claro born as the second oldest son; all were raised in a profoundly Catholic ambience. He was first educated in the local molinese Colegio de Santa Clara, a primary school ran by the Poor Clares order, later to join Colegio Molines de los Padres Escolapios (Escuelas Pias), a prestigious provincial secondary education establishment; it is there he gained the bachelor title.

Claro intended to pursue law in Madrid, but financial standing of his parents did not allow regular studies; in 1899 he entered Facultad de Derecho of Universidad Central (later to become Universidad Complutense) as an unenrolled student. Having graduated at an unspecified date he went on studying philosophy and letters, obtaining diploma in Sección de Historia in 1906. Some time afterwards he became a Doctor in both disciplines, in the Spanish education system of the time the title which enabled him to teach in primary or secondary schools.

Claro Abánades married Natalia Arpa, originating from Torrijos in the Toledo province. They initially lived in Molina de Aragón; in 1907 the family moved to Madrid, settling at calle Jesús del Valle in the university quarter. Claro was employed as professor at Colegio de la Concepción, a prestigious education institution for the privileged and the wealthy. The college remained his primary workplace for unspecified time; in the early 1930s he was already reported as headmaster of another Madrid secondary school, Colegio San Ildefonso, offering a complete Catholic curriculum from kindergarten to bachillerato, involved in education activities as late as in the early 1940s. The couple had 3 children: Claro Pedro, Mariano and María de los Angeles. The older son, born already in Molina, worked as a journalist; the younger one became a professor at another secondary school in Madrid.

== Career ==
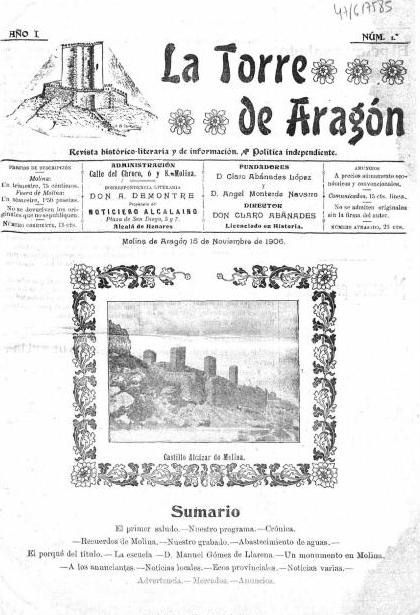
La Torre de Aragón

Abánades started his journalist career in 1897, gradually commencing co-operation with many provincial periodicals regardless of their political outlook. His contributions ranged from history to politics, literature and customs; touring the province he also kept sending local correspondence. In 1906 he co-founded a petty new journal, La Torre de Aragón; though not defined politically, it pursued a social-Catholic line. Following differences with his partner in 1908 he launched an own weekly, El Vigia de la Torre. It assumed more militant tone, claiming to have been the unique genuinely Catholic periodical in the province. One work described it as Catholic, though formatted along the Integrist pattern; another one claims that both weeklies revealed a clear Carlist leaning.

In 1910–1914 in Madrid Abánades three times unsuccessfully attempted to launch a local weekly of the Carlist youth: Juventud Tradicionalista, El Combate and El Cruzado. His career in full-blown national newspaper commenced in 1914, when he was invited to contribute to El Correo Español, the official Carlist daily. Becoming member of its editorial board, in 1919 Abánades left El Correo during the Mellista breakup in the party. The same year he became editor-in-chief of El Pensamiento Español, a journal intended to be the piecemouth of the new Mellist party, and kept managing the paper until it ceased to exist in 1923.

During the dictatorship Abánades co-operated with a vast array of dailies, be it national ones like El Día and La Nación or local ones, like the Gipuzkoan La Constancia or the Toledan El Castellano, contributing also to weeklies like La Ilustración Española y Americana or Le Touriste and unsuccessfully renewing attempts to manage own periodicals. During the Republic he contributed initially to La Correspondencia Militar, in 1932 emerging as its top commentator, though starting 1933 he switched mostly to El Siglo Futuro, formally entering its editorial board. He kept publishing also in other Catholic papers, be it local dailies like Navarrese Diario de Navarra and even Canarian Gaceta de Tenerife or weeklies like La Hormiga de oro. He is not known to have published in two leading national newspapers, the monarchist ABC and the Catholic El Debate.

Order of Alfonso X

After the Civil War Abánades was active mostly in Prensa Asociata, the agency he formed part of already before the war and where he remained during the early Francoist years. He also briefly managed an unidentified periodical named "Lúmen" and collaborated with a number of other titles, above all with El Alcázar, one of key dailies in the Falangist propaganda machinery. In the 1940s he became one of the seniors of the Spanish press corps; in 1947, 50 years after commencing his newspaper career, he was awarded the order of Alfonso X the Wise as "veterano periodista" and was later named Periodista de Honor by Asociación de la Prensa de Madrid, becoming its oldest member. His latest newspaper piece identified comes from 1969.

== Journalist profile ==
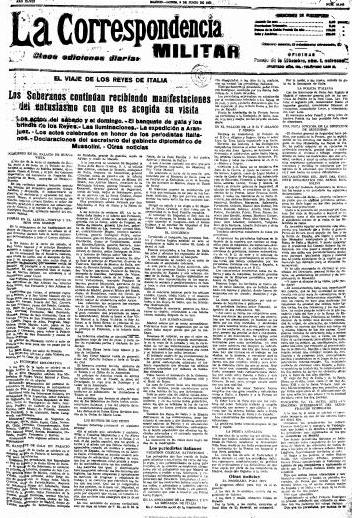
La Correspondencia Militar

Apart from privately owned, small and ephemeral newspapers, Abánades was heading a major periodical only during his 1919–1923 tenure at El Pensamiento Español; he is also known as forming part of editorial board of El Correo Español and El Siglo Futuro. None of the sources consulted claims he headed a section or held jobs in middle management editorial structures; in case of the remaining 30-odd titles he seems to have contributed as a correspondent. Though his juvenile pieces covered a wide range of topics, later on Abánades specialised in three areas. He supplied weeklies and in some cases dailies with articles focusing on history of Spain and Castile in particular, often a byproduct of his own research. As editor-in-chief of El Pensamiento Español he took part in ongoing political debates, advocating political cause of the Mellistas; later on, during the 1920s and especially the 1930s, this thread was transformed as writings on history and doctrine of Traditionalism, usually formatted as more or less direct homages to Vazquez de Mella. However, he made his name mostly as foreign affairs commentator.

His writings, usually medium-size essays of some 500 words, followed major events; their author aimed to inform the readers about international background of specific developments, their logic and implications. Some of them appear questionable; his piece on the Greek revolution of 1922 seems to confuse cause and effect. Most turned out to be quite accurate, like his 1923 prediction that having won the war France found itself isolated and was not in position to safeguard status quo negotiated in Versailles, or his 1932 analysis denouncing European collective security systems as unstable and forecasting the advent of power-based politics. Most of Abánades' comments were plagued by political bias, especially by his anti-Republican and anti-British views. He was the first to note that the Greek Republic would end up in trouble and the first to speculate how developments in Ireland or in India would work to London's disadvantage.

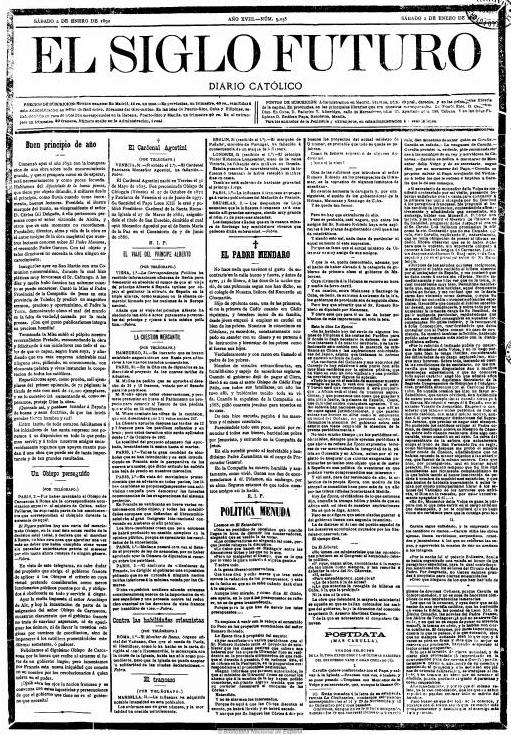
El Siglo Futuro

Abánades' vision of European political developments in the 1930s was derived from his germanophile and conservative outlook. Sympathetic towards the Central Powers during the First World War, he considered Versailles treaty responsible for long-lasting crisis in international relations. Before Hitler's ascension to power he noted that his party was "admirably organized on the national basis" and hoped that ruled by the Rightist alliance, Germany would be an example to follow when it comes to confronting "communists, anarchists and those who support them with money, namely the Jews and their branch, the freemasonry". Following the assassination of Dolfuss he shifted his sympathy to the Belgian Rexists and in particular to the Italian Fascists. Always demonstrating respect and esteem for Benito Mussolini, he titled his 1936 commentary on Abyssinian war "Italia tiene su Imperio", the headline with a highly nostalgic tone in Spain; he did not miss the opportunity to declare the British the true losers of the conflict.

== Author ==
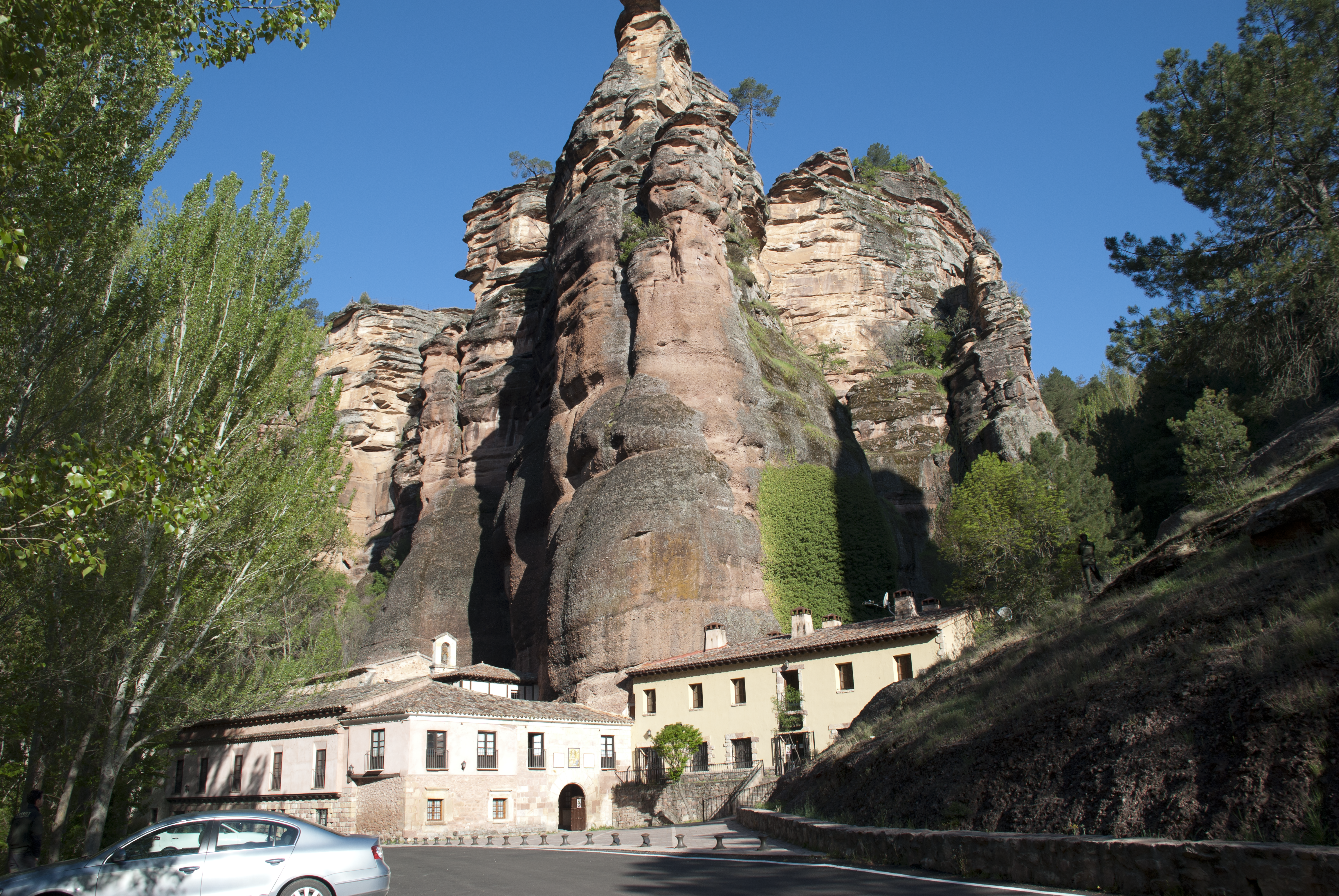
Virgen de la Hoz sanctuary

Apart from his work as a journalist Abánades was active also as a writer. He published a number of books and booklets; he wrote some of them himself, some were co-authored and in some cases he edited writings produced by the others. His work falls chiefly into 3 areas: drama, history and Carlism, the last two at times hardly distinguishable.

His original contribution consists mostly of historical works related to the Alcarra region. The first to be mentioned is El Señorío de Molina. Estudio histórico geográfico, monumental 6-volume study which has never been published; its scaled-down versions were La Ciudad de Molina (1952), El Real Señorío Molinés. Compendio de su historia (1966), Diego Sánchez Portocarrero (1966) and Tierra molinesa. Breve estudio geográfico de sus pueblo (1969), leaving also other related unedited studies in the archive. Somewhat different focus is at work at La Reina del Señorío (1929), the work dedicated to sanctuary of Virgen de la Hoz, the works on local history completed by El alcazar de Molina: la Fábrica de Artillería de Corduente (1963). Among a number of historical publications unrelated to Guadalajara province, Apuntes, para una Historia, del Colegio de Madrid de Doctores y Licenciados en Ciencias y Letras (1949) provides valuable insight into the history of Madrid educational structures. Finally, other historical studies remain in manuscript. In recognition of his merits, Abánades was nominated Cronista Oficial and Hijo Predilecto of Molina de Aragón.

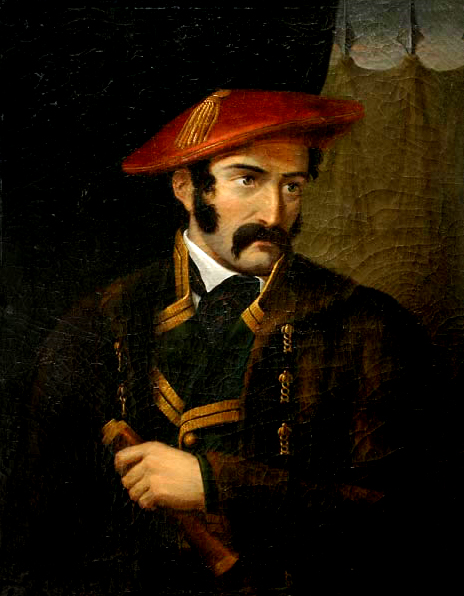
Zumalacárregui

Abánades' contribution to Carlist literature is probably mostly about his monumental, 31-volume edition of all works of Vazquez de Mella, published in the 1930s and supplemented by own synthetic attempt, Doctrina tradicionalista de las obras de Mella (1935). Works retaining historical profile are La Casa de los Tradicionalistas (1918), Leyendas y Tradiciones (1923), Carlos V de España (1935), Centenario del Tradicionalismo Español (1935), Carlos VI, Conde de Montemolín (1936), Carlos VII, Duque de Madrid (1936), Balmes (1936), Las predicciones de Mella (1940) and Dinastia insobornable (1962). Finally, publications intended as current political leaflets are Filosofía de la vida (1911), El peligro de España (1914), El año germanófilo (1915), La legitimidad and ¿Quién es el Rey, de derecho en España? (1916), La resurrección de Don Quijote (1921), Un verano, por el Mediodía de Francia (1928) and Gibraltar y Tánger (1929).

The last and the least-known part of Abánades' works is this related to the theatre. Probably in the very early years of the 20th century he wrote La mano de una madre, a drama played at various opportunities at Teatro Calderón in Molina in 1901. In the late 1920s and early 1930s he was active in Madrid as amateur actor in cultural associations like Sociedad Española de Arte; he also founded a theatrical group "Nosotros", based in Casa de Guadalajara in Madrid and active between 1934 and 1938. Finally, Abánades kept delivering public lectures, be it either on history of Molina, on Virgen de la Hoz or on de Mella and Traditionalist doctrine.

== Carlist: Restauración ==
Carlist standard

In the late 19th century the Guadalajara provincial Carlism lost much of its previous appeal, reduced mostly to support among peasantry. Nothing is known of political preferences of Pedro Abánades Jiménez, though he was allegedly proud of his son's beginnings of a conservative Catholic publisher. Apart from journalism, Claro served the cause also as an enthusiastic local Carlist activist; in 1896 he was elected president of Juventud Católica in Molina and co-founded La Benéfica Molinesa, a Catholic social fund. Thanks to his work Señorio de Molina became the most dynamic Carlist county in the province, though he animated party structures also beyond Castile; he is noted as active in the neighboring Teruel, e.g. in 1897 co-organising the propaganda tour of marquis de Cerralbo. Following the death of provincial leader, José de Sagarmínaga, the new one Pablo Marín Alonso considered Abánades one of the future alcarreña leaders and directed him towards the press propaganda, possibly resulting in launching two periodicals in 1906 and 1908.

During a Juventud Jaimista homage meeting in a Madrid restaurant in 1911 Abánades first met Juan Vazquez de Mella, the encounter which shaped his political future and theoretical outlook for the rest of his life. He immediately became one of de Mella's followers, the faction increasingly at odds with the Carlist claimant. Though during the First World War Jaime III officially backed neutral stance leaning towards the Entente, in 1915 Abánades together with Manuel Abelló and de Mella published El año germanófilo, dubbed "perfect manual of a germanophile", and kept delivering pro-German lectures. It was de Mella who invited him to join El Correo Español, the official party newspaper that two opposing Carlist factions competed to control. Finally, in 1919 Abánades followed de Mella when he was expulsed from the party.

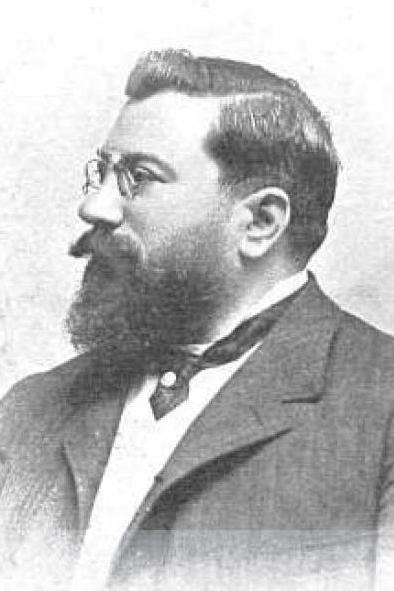
Juan Vazquez de Mella

The years of 1919–1923 mark the climax of Abánades' political career, as it was the only period when he emerged from the party back benches. Though he did not hold any major posts in the newly emergent Mellist organization, Partido Tradicionalista and by historians he is not counted among key Mellistas, he was entrusted with the task of managing the party newspaper, El Pensamiento Español. Abánades propagated political line of his leader, speaking against taking any official posts, lambasting idea of a right-wing monarchist party and especially voicing mistrust towards some conciliatory gestures made by Alfonso XIII versus Traditionalism. He advocated derogation of 1876 constitution and building an entirely new Traditionalist regime, possibly based on military dictatorship. At the time when political system of Restauración was falling into pieces and two major partidos turnistas were rapidly disintegrating, it might have appeared that an anti-establishment extreme-Right alliance envisioned by de Mella could grow into a major player on the Spanish political scene. However, Mellismo proved ineffective as agglutinatory force and decomposed in the early 1920s; El Pensamiento Español ceasing to exist.

== Carlist: dictatorship, republic and Francoism ==
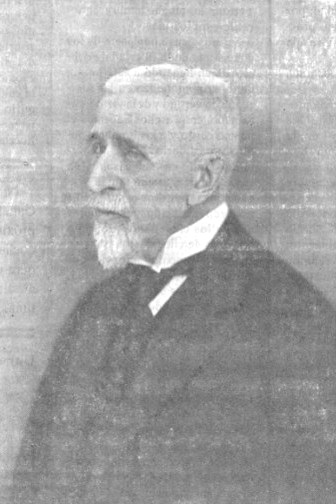
Alfonso Carlos

Unlike most Mellistas who left the party to pursue their career elsewhere, Abánades was one of the few faithful and remained also a personal friend of Mella, who withdrew from politics. This boiled down to his political isolation during Primo de Rivera dictatorship; Abánades was active neither in semi-official Carlist structures nor in official primoderiverista institutions. In 1931–1932 together with many already orphaned former Mellistas he reconciled with the new Carlist king Alfonso Carlos and joined the united Carlist organization, Comunión Tradicionalista. He did not assume major posts, merely forming part of Junta del Círculo Tradicionalista de Madrid. His contribution to the cause consisted mostly of propaganda activities: press articles, books, booklets and semi-scholarly lectures. Second-row speaker, he was usually not mentioned in press headlines. His modest personal victory was getting elected to Madrid educational board, hailed by conservative press as "triumph of the Right".

It is not clear whether Abánades was involved or aware of the forthcoming coup of July 1936; none of the sources consulted provides also any information about his whereabouts during the Civil War and the very first years of Francoism. A single author claims he joined those Carlists who estranged the intransigent regent-claimant Don Javier and aligned themselves with the partido unico amalgamation line; indeed in 1943 he is noted as paying homage to founders of Falange and involved in the Francoist propaganda, especially El Alcazar. On the other hand, at the same time he was recorded as active in Academia Vazquez de Mella, a semi-official Carlist cultural enterprise; In the 1940s he joined supporters of Karl Pius, styled as the Carlist claimant Carlos VIII, though at that time he was engaged mostly in religious projects, culminating in crowning of Virgen de la Hoz as Reina de Molina de Aragón.

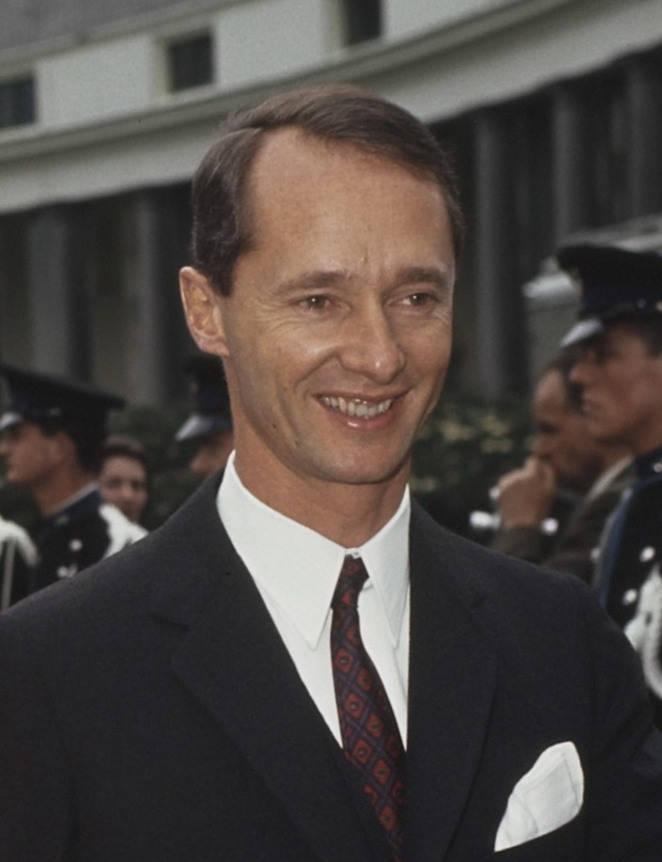
Carlos Hugo, 1968

Once Carlism abandoned its opposition strategy in the mid-1950s Abánades was awkwardly involved in a new internal power struggle. At that time a young generation of socially minded activists, grouped around prince Carlos Hugo, launched their bid to take control of Carlism. It was they who benefitted most from the new rapprochement policy towards Francoism, as javieristas controlled many new Carlist institutions, now officially permitted by the regime. One of them was Círculos Culturales Vázquez de Mella, soon formatted by the socialist youth as means of disseminating their vision. Not yet ready for open challenge, they invited older Carlists as front-men, supposed to provide them with Traditionalist credentials. Abánades was probably not aware of the plot when elected president of Junta Nacional de los Círculos Vázquez de Mella in 1959, later becoming the honorary president. In the early 1960s - officially reconciled with the Javierista Carlists - he was celebrated by Carlos Hugo and his faction, awarded orders, presiding over official homages to de Mella, quoted as authority on his writings and receiving flattering letters from the prince. In 1969 he published his last article identified, printed in the Carlist periodical.

== See also ==
- Carlism
- Alcarria
- Molina de Aragón
- Juan Vázquez de Mella
- El Siglo Futuro
- Virgen de la Hoz
