= Correspondent (disambiguation) =

A correspondent is a journalist or commentator.

(The) correspondent(s) may also refer to:

== Publications and websites ==
- De Correspondent, a Dutch news website; English version, The Correspondent in 2019–2020
- The Committee of Correspondence Newsletter, also known as The Correspondent, a foreign affairs publication produced by Harvard University, 1961–1965
- The Sunday Correspondent, a short-lived British weekly newspaper, 1989–1990

== Other uses ==
- The Correspondent (film), a 2024 Australian biopic about journalist Peter Greste
- The Correspondent (novel), a 2025 novel by Virginia Evans
- The Correspondents (band), a London-based swing/hip-hop duo made up of DJ "Chucks" and MC and lead singer "Mr Bruce"
- The Correspondents (TV program), investigative documentary television show in the Philippines (1998–2010)

== See also ==
- Correspondence (disambiguation)
- Co-respondent, the "other person" in a suit for divorce on grounds of adultery
- Correspondent account, an account established by a bank to handle financial transactions for another financial institution
- Foreign Correspondent (disambiguation)
- Pen pal
