= Dalmacio Iglesias García =

Spanish politician (1879–1933)

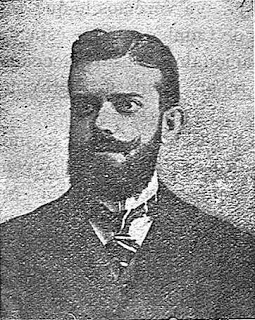
- Born: Dalmacio Iglesias García; 1879; Santibáñez el Bajo, Spain
- Died: 1933 (aged 53–54); Barcelona, Spain
- Known for: politician
- Political party: Carlism

Jesús María José Dalmacio Iglesias García (1879–1933) was a Spanish Carlist politician, active almost exclusively in Catalonia. His career climaxed during one term in the Congress of Deputies (1910–1914) and one term in the Senate (1918–1919). He did not manage to build his personal following; in historiography he is considered a unique case of a right-wing revolutionary who strove to launch a Christian, violent, urban, working class, anti-establishment movement. The bid ultimately failed and in the 1920s Iglesias withdrew from active politics.

== Family and youth ==
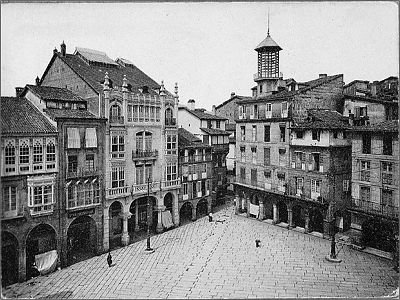
Orense, around 1900

The ancestors of Dalmacio Iglesias were related to Galicia. His paternal family originated from Orense; his grandfather, Victorio Iglesias Fernández, served as oficial primero of Tesorería de Hacienda in the city. He married Vicenta Pardo and the couple had at least two sons; both of them studied medicine. The younger one, Luis Iglesias Pardo, served as physician in the Spanish navy; he gained some recognition in the maritime and local Galician realm as author of scientific works on medicine, sanitation and hygiene in the navy, all published in the 1870s and 1880s. The older brother, Antonio Iglesias Pardo (1844–1902), opted for a civilian career; in the 1870s he served in Cáceres, but in 1885 he left Extremadura and returned to his native Orense. Until the mid-1890s he worked as surgeon in the city and in some neighboring locations, including these already in the Salamanca province. In 1898 he commenced practice in the Santiago de Compostela hospital, where he served until his premature death.

At unspecified time though probably prior to the mid-1870s Antonio Iglesias married María Asunción García Legond, a native of Santiago and member to another family related to military medical services. It is not clear how many children the couple had. Dalmacio was born during the Cáceres spell of his father, where he probably spent his childhood years. In the mid-1880s he moved with his parents to Orense, living at calle Cervantes 15. It is there where in the local Insituto – the secular secondary school – he was rewarded with high grades upon his bachillerato. At an unspecified time yet most likely in the late 1890s he enrolled at the faculty of law at Universidad de Santiago, where his career was punctuated by a brief period of military service. As a university student he performed brilliantly; Iglesias obtained governmental prize in course of the curriculum, was rewarded for his study on legal rights of married woman and achieved premio extraordinario when he graduated in 1902.

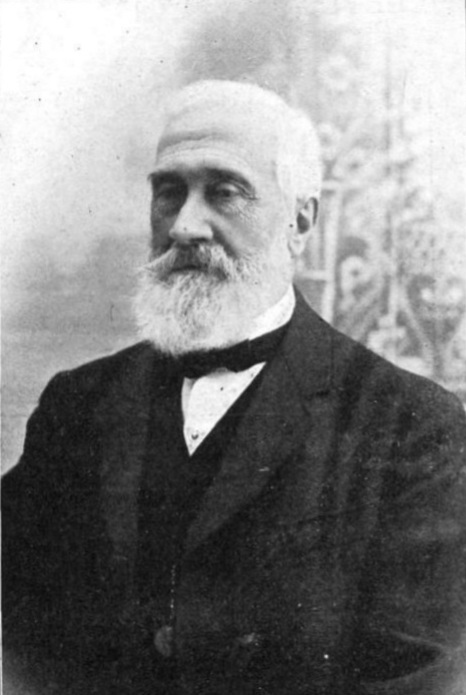
Erasmo Janer

Upon passing entry exams in early 1903 Iglesias was admitted to Ministerio de Hacienda and moved to Madrid, soon to be placed as the ministry delegate in Barcelona. In ciudad condal in 1907 he married Mercedes Janer Milá de la Roca (died 1963), daughter to a Catalan Carlist leader and wealthy entrepreneur José Erasmo Janer Gironella. Dalmacio and Mercedes settled in the Catalan capital. None of their descendants became a publicly recognized figure. They had one child, María de las Mercedes, who married a navy officer Federico Caso Montaner. Dalmacio Iglesias did not live to see his only grandson, Alberto Caso Iglesias, who would later become a physician. Dalmacio's sister-in-law María gained name as a Carlist propagandist and activist, while his brother-in-law Ignacio became a locally known writer. Cousins of his wife Erasme and José Lasarte Janer turned recognized Catalan artists, respectively a painter and a writer. It is not clear whether a well-known singer Julio Iglesias, who also originated from Orense, was his distant relative.

== Early public activity (before 1910) ==
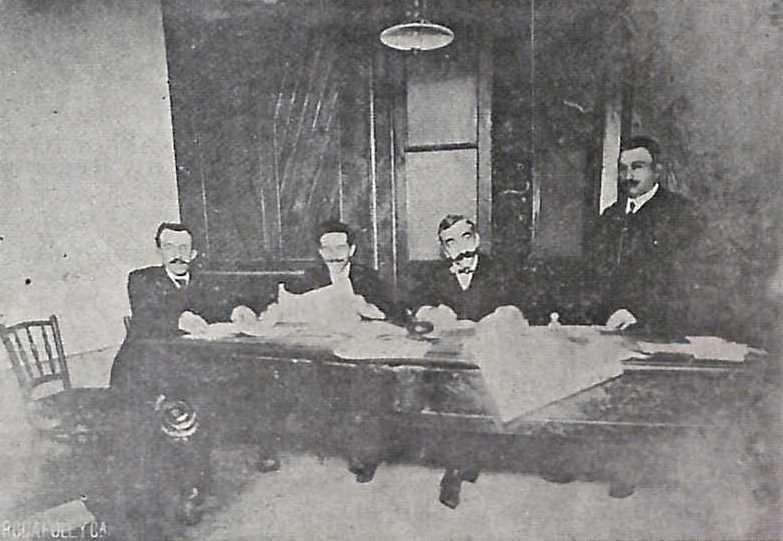
Gaceta de Galicia editorial board, around 1904 (Iglesias not present)

The young Dalmacio has early developed a penchant for letters and already in 1893 he contributed to local periodicals. During his academic period he kept publishing and founded an ephemeral literary weekly Santiago. He practiced his oratory skills in Ateneo Escolar Compostelano, where he became first the secretary and then the president, and in Ateneo Leon XIII. Inclined towards literature, he used to read out his own poetry and wrote prosaic pieces in Gallego, his works were flavored with militant religious zeal. In 1902 he took part in the Catholic Congress in Santiago and presented a paper at a section dedicated to religious orders. It was during the academic period when Iglesias was fascinated by the personality of Juan Vázquez de Mella and got attracted to Carlism.

It seems that upon arrival in Catalonia Iglesias engaged in Carlist youth structures; in 1904 he was noted as giving lectures in Círculo Tradicionalista of Barcelona and in late 1905 he became vice-president of Juventud Tradicionalista in the city, delivering addresses also elsewhere in Catalonia, e.g. in Gerona. At the time the Catalan Carlists were more than ever prepared to swallow their skepticism about alliance with other anti-governmental parties, especially the regionalists from La Lliga; the strategy produced a broad electoral alliance known as Solidaridad Catalana. Iglesias spoke vehemently against this "hermandad vulgo pisto rabioso pactada"; his highly emotional harangues earned him attention of the Liberal and Republican press, as already in early 1906 he featured as a negative point of reference.

Apart from his duties as a Ministry of Finance delegate Iglesias practiced also as a lawyer. In 1908 he got involved in a controversial and widely discussed case known as "caso Rull". Rull was an undercover police operative who penetrated the world of Barcelona proletarian conspiracy but was himself charged with terrorism, perhaps related to some extreme party or organization. Iglesias first represented some of the defendants in court and later defended Rull himself in an appeal case. The two seemed to have developed sort of friendship yet the prosecutor had his way and Rull was eventually executed; during and after the affair Iglesias was widely quoted speaking on terrorism and related issues. The Rull affair gained Iglesias a name in Barcelona, since in 1909 he emerged as expert on "antrolopología criminal".

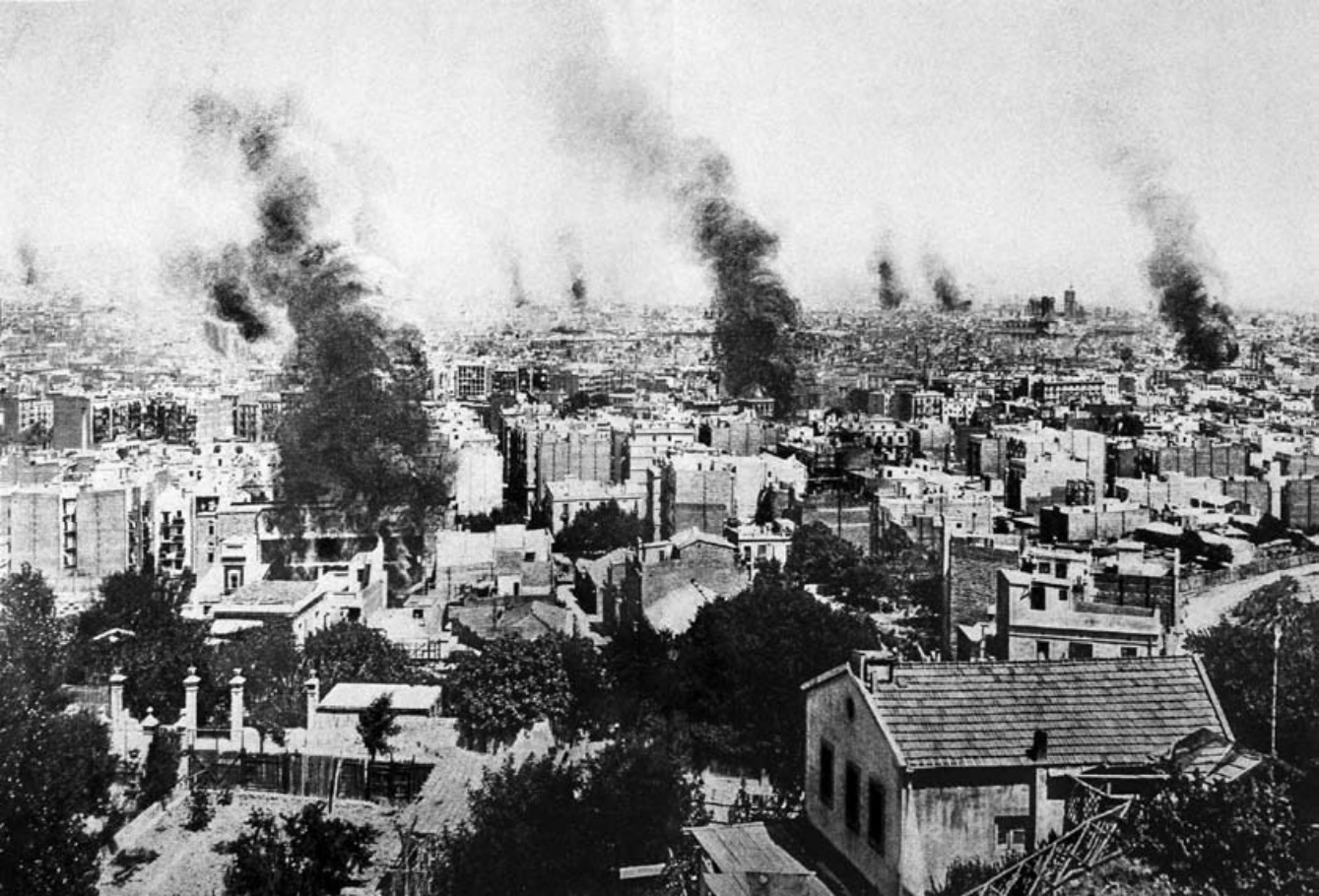
burning churches during Semana Tragica, Barcelona 1909

Once the city was rocked by riots known as Semana Trágica Iglesias voiced against "doctrinas positivistas" and secular teaching, identified as primary roots of urban unrest. In 1909 and in response to left-wing violence Iglesias engaged in Catholic social action and was among the founders of Carlism-related Comité de Defensa Social, a hybrid organisation with characteristics of a cultural centre, a mutual help organization, a militia and a trade union. As a joint CdDS and Carlist representative supported by other right-wing groupings he ran in the Cortes elections from Gerona in 1910; riding the wave of anti-Left backlash which followed The Tragic Week he somewhat unexpectedly emerged triumphant.

== Political climax (1910-1914) ==
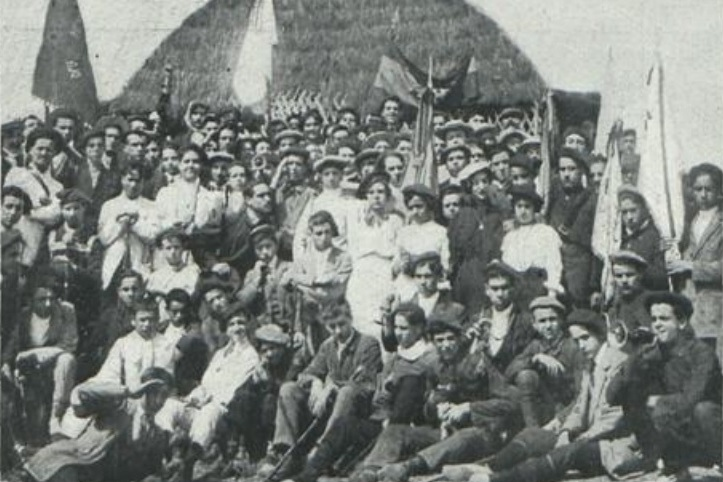
Catalan requetés, 1910s

The 1910–1914 Cortes service proved the period of Iglesias' hectic if not frenetic activity, especially during the first two years of his tenure. Though he focused also on topics like the army and economy he was mostly bent on confronting the Radicals of Lerroux, whom he presented as a threat not only to public order but also to the entire civilization. His own rhetoric was inflammatory; Canalejas noted that in his counter-revolutionary zeal he was carried away by hysteria. Though member of the diet, Iglesias emerged as leader of right-wing Catalan obrerismo, a working class violent anti-establishment movement. Confronting both radical lerrouxistas and bourgeoisie La Lliga, Iglesias started to champion what looked like a nascent Christian, urban, aggressive, proletarian protest crusade. His zeal to do away with the regime would soon lead him to advancing theories of Carlists and republicans joining ranks to topple the Restoration system, quickly quashed by the party hierarchy and rejected by the Republicans.

Iglesias's name soon became tantamount to an explosive conflict. Due to violent language employed and logic which instigated rebellion his press articles gave rise to many official enquiries. In the early 1910s he managed himself two weeklies: La Voz de la Tradición and La Trinchera; especially the latter emerged as the chief platform of violent obrerista propaganda which indulged in "fantasies of civil war in which Carlism triumphed". Police prevented sale of his discourses and he was among the most investigated MPs, by far surpassing the first ever socialist MP in the Spanish parliament, Pablo Iglesias.

Almost every second rally Iglesias attended ended up in riots, usually between the Carlist requetés and the Radical Jovenes Barbaros. Even his expected attendance might have led to violent clashes, e.g. with two dead left in Eibar. He was a few times assaulted. However, the most deadly turned out to be a 1911 urban battle in Sant Feliu de Llobregat; following his address at a Carlist rally hundreds of requetés and lerrouxistas engaged in a melee which left 6 people killed, the incident investigated later in the parliament. It is with his personal contribution that "from 1911 to 1916 scuffling and occasional shoot-outs between Carlist and Radical youth were an accepted part of the Barcelona scene", especially that in 1913 he hailed "the club and the browning, the two indispensable companions of Jaimist youth".

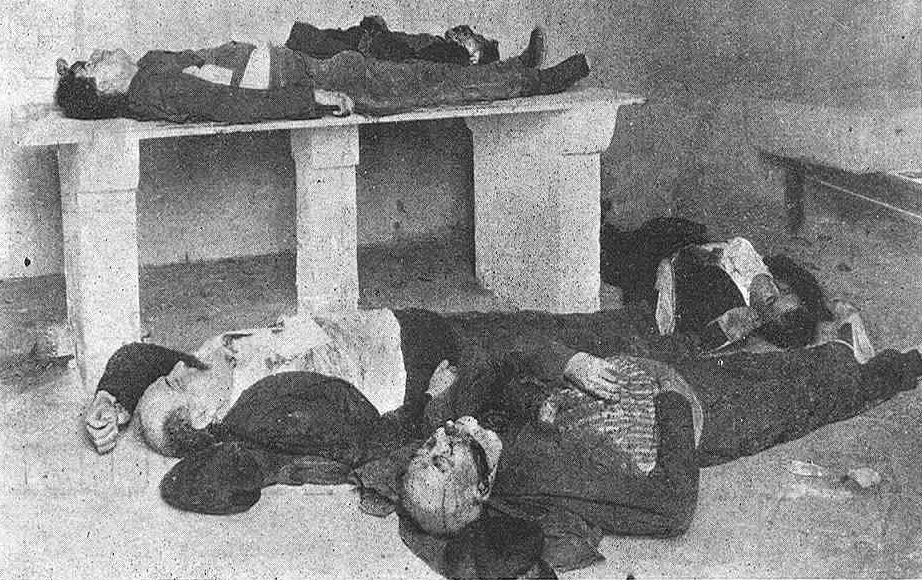
Victims of Sant Feliu clashes, 1911

Iglesias' radicalism estranged the Catalan Carlist leadership and the regional party jefe Duque de Solferino a few times tried to mitigate him; despite being Gerona MP Iglesias did not head the provincial Gerona organisation. Iglesias himself started to dream of old-fashioned party leaders killed in a civil war and making room for the youth. However, in 1912 he entered the national Carlist executive and also in 1912 in Biarritz he met his king for the first time. He did not seem engaged in struggle for power within the party top echelons and is not listed as protagonist of a raging conflict between his old-time master Vázquez de Mella and the official party leader, Bartolomé Feliu.

== On the verge of loyalty (1914-1919) ==
Carlist standard

In the 1914 electoral campaign Iglesias stood as a Carlist candidate in Gerona and though proportionally he was more successful than 4 years earlier, ultimately he failed to renew his deputy ticket. It would soon turn out that he failed in his later bids – also from Gerona - of 1916 and 1918. Iglesias acknowledged defeat, resumed his suspended duties as Hacienda delegate and re-opened the law office in Barcelona.

Always skeptical about courting La Lliga, in the mid-1910s Iglesias started to lead an anti-Catalanist group within the local party. Though he declared himself a regionalist and even in favor of autonomy, by scholars he is considered a champion of anti-regionalist españolismo; opponent of the new Catalan Carlist leader Miguel Junyent and his daily El Correo Catalan, Iglesias openly challenged his line of seeking understanding with the Catalanists. The rift became clear when in 1915 he founded El Legitimista Catalan; the national party jefe Cerralbo disauthorised the paper and threatened these taking part in a related meeting with expulsion; the meeting took place and invariably ended in riots, but the weekly was eventually closed after just 3 months. Iglesias found himself on the verge of loyalty to the party, yet Cerralbo preferred not to escalate the conflict; in 1916 he confirmed Iglesias as the party candidate from Gerona, which in turn triggered protest resignation of the local Carlist Junta Provincial. Iglesias kept lambasting a policy which according to him melted Carlism in a broad Catalanism; upon the 1917 emergence of Parliamentary Assembly he strongly voiced against the initiative as giving in to the likes of Lerroux and Cambó.

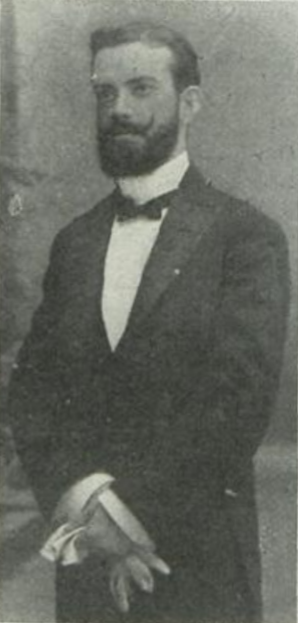
Iglesias as senator, 1918

There were two other threads which rendered Iglesias a key protagonist of internal conflict in regional Carlism. One was his continued penchant for social radicalism; he remained active in Comité de Defensa Social and even built its militia, apart from reverting to a theory that the Carlists should close ranks with "extrema izquierda" in order to do away with the corrupted regime. Another conflictive issue was the Great War. While the party officially supported neutrality most Catalan Carlists harbored francophone feelings; Iglesias emerged as leader of the local pro-German faction, noted for his cries of viva Alemania and even for declaration that he was prepared to shed blood if the time comes.

It remains paradoxical that despite his extremely conflictive personality Iglesias remained on at least formally correct terms with other party leaders; in 1917 together with Junyent he entered Comité de Acción Política of the Catalan Carlism, a new body of somewhat unclear role. It seems even more surprising that following defeat in 1918 elections Iglesias managed to ensure support of conservative parties when competing for seat in the Senate from Tarragona; it seems that he owed success to Maura and his ruling faction rather than to his own party. During a short term between mid-1918 and mid-1919 he basked in prestige of a senator and contributed to a few legal solutions adopted, e.g. to the law on civil servants.

== In search of a new political identity (1919-1923) ==
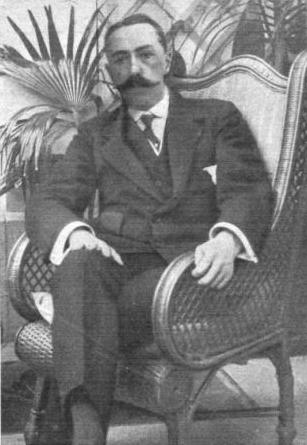
Don Jaime, around 1919

Conflict between the key party theorist Vázquez de Mella and the claimant Don Jaime, the strife which was tearing Carlism apart since the late 1900s, came to an abrupt end in early 1919: the Mellistas broke away to build their own party. Iglesias has always remained fascinated with de Mella yet he did not count among his partisans in course of internal conflict; it was only during the First World War that he emerged as key Catalan Mellista. In February 1919 he was expulsed from Comunión Tradicionalista and immediately engaged in work to build a new Mellista organization. After Teodoro Más, leader of the Catalan secessionists, Iglesias was the most prominent exponent of the breakaways in the region and some count him among the most prominent secessionists also nationwide; some authors name him a leader of "dalmacistas", one of a few mostly personalist factions allegedly making up the Mellista group.

Upon expiration of the senator mandate in May 1919 Iglesias for the 5th time tried to obtain the deputy ticket from Gerona and for the 4th time failed; initially reported to run for a consolation prize in the senate from Tarragona he eventually withdrew. He contributed to local efforts of forging a new party within a grand right-wing coalition and specified his program as "religión, unidad de la Patria española, Orden social y Monarquía tradicional y, por tanto, regionalista"; indeed he supported the autonomous statute drafted by Mancomunitat. During a grand assembly of Catalan Mellistas in Badalona of 1920 he hoped they would serve as agglutinatory factor for all Catholic forces, yet such a union was slow to materialize: in 1921 he was denied the Maurista support during one more bid for the senate. As usual his appearances led to unrest, though in 1921 his rally was interrupted by his former darlings requetés, who shouted "viva Jaime Tercero".

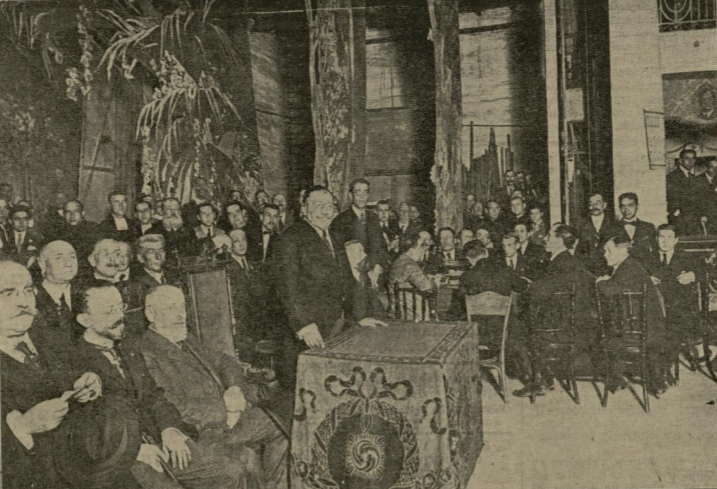
Mellista meeting, Barcelona 1921

In mid-1922 Iglesias was still reported as heart and soul of the new emerging Mellista party and seemed prepared to go to great lengths when seeking allies, most likely the Integrists; he admitted that having broken all ties with Don Jaime, he was prepared to recognize Don Alfonso as a legitimate king given he swears allegiance to the Traditionalist principles. However, at some point he apparently lost any hope about the Mellista project. Tempted by Partido Social Popular of Salvador Minguijón and other breakaway Carlists, he considered it a would-be embodiment of "sumarse al partido católico" plan. Eventually he neared an initiative to launch a non-dynastical monarchist party, though still remained cautious that the Traditionalists should not lose their own identity. In late 1922 Iglesias was missing among participants of overdue Mellista party launch in Zaragoza and joined Unión Monárquica Nacional instead. In 1923 he was once again rumored to run – as independent – for deputy ticket from Gerona. His political bewilderment was eventually terminated by the Primo de Rivera coup and ban on all party activity.

== Primoderiverista and afterwards (1923-1933) ==
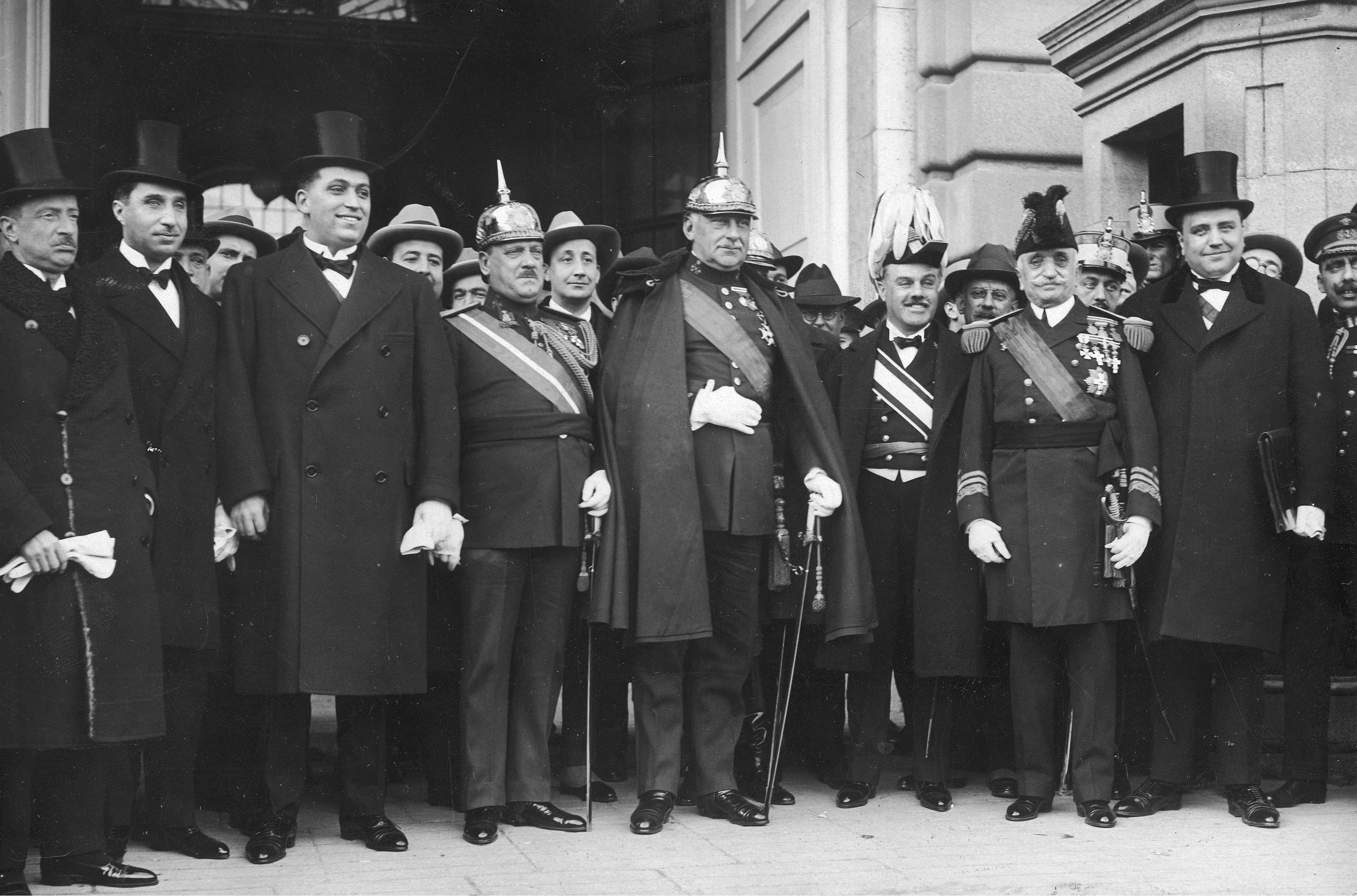
The members of Primo de Rivera's civil directorate in December 1925. In the front row, from left to right, Eduardo Callejo (Public Instruction), José Yanguas (State), José Calvo Sotelo (Treasury), Severiano Martínez Anido (Interior), Miguel Primo de Rivera (President), Count of Guadalhorce (Public Works), Honorio Cornejo (Navy) and Eduardo Aunós (Labor).

Iglesias had no doubt about adhering to the new regime. Already in late 1923 he took part in homage feasts celebrating Primo as savior of the fatherland; explicitly exalting "golpe de estado" he offered his services to the military directorio. During a 1924 rally of Juventud de Acción Tradicionalista he hailed the coup as doing away with the old regime and as a deed spirited by traditionalist principles.

Exact scale of Iglesias' engagement in the primoderiverista regime is not clear. He later claimed that during personal meetings with the dictator he had tried to impose upon Primo his own social concerns and that he had repeatedly suggested that the regime should lower the cost of life for the middle- and working class. Press information confirms only his meetings with the Catalan capitán general, yet their purpose was not revealed. Active in Union Patriotica, in the late 1920s he seemed less enthusiastic about the dictatorial regime and criticized the constitution draft as the one which reproduced most defects of the 1876 document; in his 1930 pamphlet, Política de la dictadura, Iglesias charged Primo with giving in to capitalist pressure and abandoning the cause of the working people; another pamphlet read like an offer to a centre-left political party.

In private Iglesias was confirmed at his job of Ministry of Finance delegate to Catalonia; his career was not ruined even by a fistfight with another official over his allegedly unsubstantiated absence in the office, perhaps the last manifestation of Iglesias' notorious inflammatory personality. In the mid-1920s he competed for position of Jefe de la sección de Hacienda and in 1927 he was promoted to Jefé Superior de Administración Civil in Catalonia. At that time he emerged as expert on canon law and author of a few related works, which probably earned him Cruz de Oro of Pro Ecclesia et Pontifice order, awarded by the pope. Indeed, in the late 1920s he was noted in public mostly as engaged in numerous religious activities. As expert in juridical science he edited a number of entries in Enciclopedia Espasa, including the one on himself. Last but not least, he was not missing during the 1928 funeral of his old-time master Vázquez de Mella and the acts related.

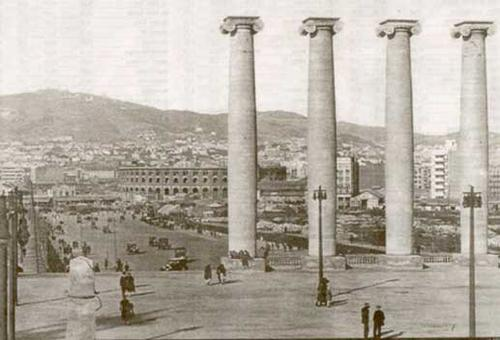
Barcelona, 1929

There is scarce information on Iglesias' public activity during the last few years of his life. Until death he remained employed as the Catalan delegado de Hacienda. In June 1931 he was rumored to run on a joint right-wing ticket for the Cortes and indeed later that year he was once noted as speaking at a Traditionalism-flavored rally, yet unlike many former Mellistas, Iglesias has not been reported as engaged in a re-united Carlist organization, Comunión Tradicionalista. Since the early 1920s he was plagued by health problems, yet their nature is not clear and it is not known what caused his premature death. Many periodicals noted his death, including at least one Carlist paper.

== See also ==
- Traditionalism (Spain)
- Carlism
- Electoral Carlism (Restoration)
- 1911 Sant Feliu de Llobregat confrontation
