= Foreign Correspondent =

Foreign Correspondent (s) may refer to:

== Film and TV ==
- Foreign Correspondent (film), an Alfred Hitchcock 1940 film
- Foreign Correspondent (TV series), an Australian current affairs programme
- Foreign Correspondents (film), a 1999 American film

== Other uses ==
- Foreign correspondent (journalism), a journalist who reports from foreign countries

== See also ==
- Correspondence (disambiguation)
