= Correspondence =

Correspondence may refer to:

- In general usage, non-concurrent, remote communication between people, including letters, email, newsgroups, Internet forums, blogs.

== Science ==
- Correspondence principle (physics): quantum physics theories must agree with classical physics theories when applied to large quantum numbers
- Correspondence principle (sociology), the relationship between social class and available education
- Correspondence problem (computer vision), finding depth information in stereography
- Regular sound correspondence (linguistics), see Comparative method (linguistics)

== Mathematics ==
- Binary relation
  - Mathematical correspondence, a more general term than bijection
- Set-valued function, for a correspondence as a function representing a set.
- Correspondence (algebraic geometry), between two algebraic varieties
- Corresponding sides and corresponding angles, between two polygons
- Correspondence (category theory), the opposite of a profunctor
- Correspondence (von Neumann algebra) or bimodule, a type of Hilbert space
- Correspondence analysis, a multivariate statistical technique

== Philosophy and religion ==
- Correspondence theory of truth, a theory in epistemology
- Correspondence (theology), the relationship between spiritual and physical realities
- Table of magical correspondences, list of relations between various items used in ceremonial magic

== Entertainment ==
- Correspondence chess played between different geographical locations
- Correspondence (album), a 1983 studio album by singer and musician Peter Godwin
- The Correspondence, a 2016 film by Giuseppe Tornatore, featuring Jeremy Irons
- Correspondences (Babbitt), a 1967 musical work by Milton Babbitt

== Other uses ==
- Correspondence course, a distant education method

== See also ==
- Correspondent (disambiguation)
- La Correspondencia (disambiguation)
