= José Pascual de Liñán y Eguizábal =

Spanish writer, publisher and Carlist politician

José Liñán Eguizábal
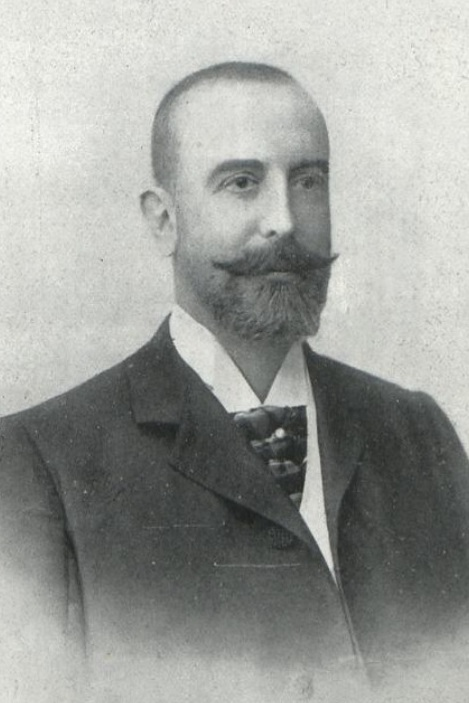
- Born: José Liñán Eguizábal; 1858; Madrid
- Died: 1934 (aged 75–76); Miraflores de la Sierra
- Occupations: landowner, banker, lawyer
- Known for: politician
- Political party: Carlism

José Pascual de Liñán y Eguizábal, Count of Doña Marina (1858–1934) was a Spanish writer, publisher and Carlist politician. He is known mostly as the manager of two Traditionalist dailies, issued in the 1890s and 1900s in the Vascongadas, and as the author of minor works related to jurisprudence and history. As a politician he briefly headed the Carlist regional party organization in Castile, though he is recognized rather as an architect of political rebranding of Carlism in the late 19th century.

== Family and youth ==
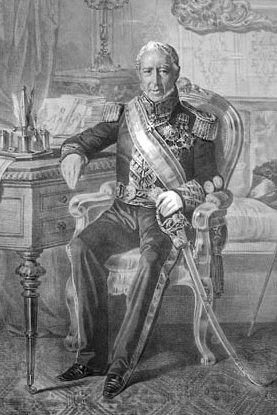
Pascual de Liñán y Dolz

The Liñán family counts among the oldest ones in Spain; its first representative, Pier de Linyan, was noted in the early 12th century as taking part in Reconquista and serving under Alfonso I de Aragón. His descendants formed a much-branched dynasty of military commanders and civil servants, many of them noted in history of the country and some in history of Latin America. One of its lines remained related to South-Eastern Aragón, holding a number of estates in the provinces of Zaragoza and Teruel. Its descendant and José Pascual's grandfather, Pascual Sebastián de Liñán y Dolz de Espejo (1775-1855), made his name during the Peninsular War, when he rose to a general; dispatched to New Spain and serving as governor of Veracruz, back in Spain he was capitán general de Madrid and stayed loyal to Fernando VII during the First Carlist War.

Pascual Sebastián's son and José Pascual's father, Pascual de Liñán y Fernández-Rubio (1837-1920), inherited some of the Aragón landholdings and entered the emerging bourgeoisie by trying his hand in the insurance business. He made less of a public figure: apart from becoming the royal mayordomo de semana, in the late 1870s he briefly served as a provincial Madrid deputy and an Aragon deputy to the Cortes, in both cases affiliated with the Conservatives. Pascual de Liñán married María de los Dolores Eguizábal Cavanilles (died 1897), daughter of an intellectual, politician, deputy and senator of the Isabelline era, José Eugenio de Eguizábal. The couple lived in their properties in Aragón, Valencia and Madrid. They had 3 children, José Pascual born as the older of two sons.

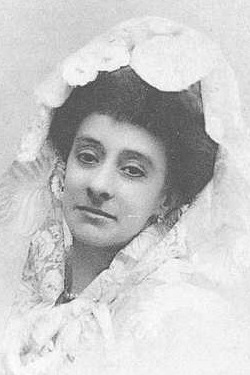
María Heredia Saavedra

José Pascual was first educated in Escuelas Pías de San Anton and Instituto de San Isidro in Madrid, curriculum later referred to as "sólida educación cristiana", and excelled in history. In 1875, he was already studying derecho romano, to graduate in derecho y administración in 1879. Shortly afterwards he was appointed abogado fiscal sustituido at the provincial Madrid court and entered the Madrid colegio de abogados, becoming also secretary of Academia de Jurisprudencia y Legislación. In 1880 he married a girl from Andalusia, María Josefa de Heredia y Saavedra (1860-1929), descendant to two aristocratic families. Her great-grandfather along the paternal line, Narciso Heredia y Begines de los Ríos, was the moderado prime minister in the late 1830s; her maternal grandfather, Ángel de Saavedra, was briefly the prime minister in 1854, but is better known as a romantic poet and dramatist. In 1891 she inherited the title of Countess of Doña Marina. As her husband José Pascual de Liñán became conde-consorte. Though the couple inherited a number of estates they settled in Madrid. They had one child, Narciso José de Liñán y Heredia, 3. Count of Doña Marina; he was moderately active as a Carlist and held high posts in the realm of archives and museums during the Republic and early Francoism.

== Author ==
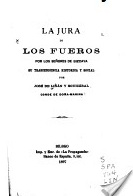
Jura de los Fueros

Already as a child José demonstrated a knack for letters; his 1871 poem was printed in a religious review. The interest was developed during his teenage years: in 1875 he used to publish theatrical reviews, in 1876 he established firm co-operation with a literary periodical La Revista, and in 1879 he went on publishing juvenile poetry. He kept writing rhymes also later on, though they were reserved mostly for private audience. It is only by the end of his life that Doña Marina resumed publishing brief poetical pieces; few of them went into print in 1928 and 1929. Revolving around the same religious topics as verses written 50 years earlier they demonstrated also the same unshaken faith. Already juvenile works revealed a penchant for melancholy; it governs unchallenged in his late lyrics. Moderately contributing to Carlism in literature, by some foreigners he was considered him "the best Spanish poet".

Works which earned Doña Marina a reputation of an erudite and intellectual are medium-size academic or semi-academic studies, published as articles in scientific and literary reviews, as stand-alone booklets or as sections of larger compilation books. Their number does not exceed 40 titles; they chiefly fall into 3 areas: law, letters and history.

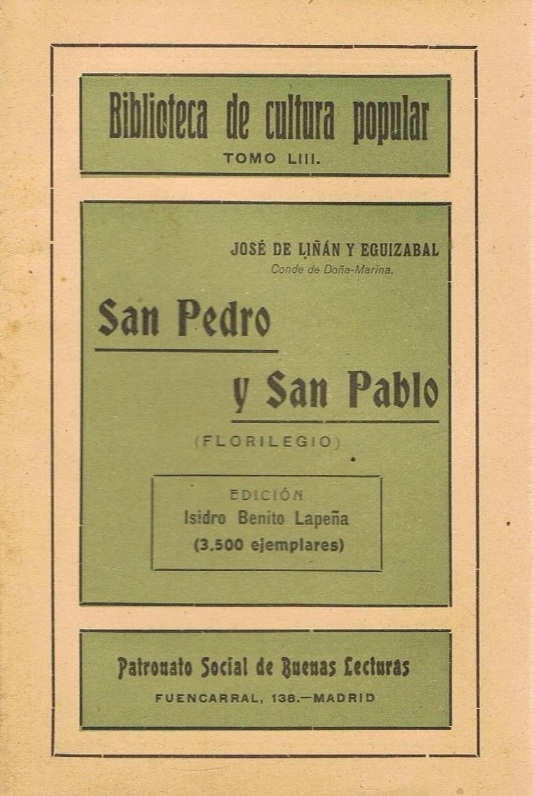
San Pedro y San Pablo

Liñán's juridical studies deal mostly with constitutional law and tend to be slightly flavored with politics, approached from Traditionalist perspective; other tackle civil law or regulations related to nobility, apart from studies on history of Spanish law, including one brief synthetic attempt. Almost all are of purely historical value; the exception is analysis of hereditary regulations, quoted in juridical scientific discourse as late as in 1966. Historical works focus on early modern period and are usually formatted as biographical studies, with some pieces clearly forming part of genealogy or heraldry; many exploit author's own family links. The single one which remains a point of reference until today is the work on Aragon heraldic issues. Studies on history of literature also tend to deal with personalities rather than with broad phenomena. Numerous minor works published in popular periodicals and formatted as reviews form part of ongoing critique and are not acknowledged here. Finally, Lo que pide el obrero (1890) was a unique attempt to tackle the social question. Though profoundly religious, he has never published a strictly confessional work; he did not live to complete Iconografía Mariana Española.

Throughout all his life Doña Marina contributed to various periodicals, usually providing essays related to history, literature and religion. Except El Correo Español almost all of them are either local or ephemeral publications; he has not published in any of the established reviews. His pen-names identified were "E. Quis", "Jaime de Lobera", "Tirso de Aragón", "Pedro Pablo de Larrea" and "El Bachiller Zamudio". In the late Restoration he was counted among "publicistas eminentisimos" of Traditionalism.

== Publisher ==
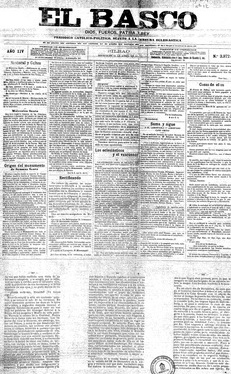
El Basco

Though he started contributing to popular newspapers and periodicals in the late 1870s, Liñán did not commence closer co-operation with any title and did not gain editorial experience prior to 1887; that year he entered editorial board of La Verdad, a local Traditionalist daily issued in Santander. He soon took over editing the newspaper. When at this role he was assaulted on the street and suffered major injuries; perpetrators have never been identified. Editing La Verdad proved to have been just an episode; following political differences with the director in 1887, he resigned few months later.

Because of his Eguizábal ancestors Liñán was related to the Vascongadas and especially to Bilbao, where his maternal great-grandfather came from. Having cultivated the family link in 1888 he was invited to join the editorial board of El Vasco, the Traditionalist daily since 1884 issued in the Biscay capital. Together with Enrique Olea he purchased the newspaper in 1889. Liñán retained political line of the newspaper and engaged in a number of heated political debates. El Vasco represented also a firm regionalist line; since 1890 the daily appeared as El Basco. Periodically Doña Marina ceded editorial duties to Miguel Ortigosa and Enrique de Olea. Businesswise the enterprise turned to have been a challenging one; with the number of subscribers at 700-900, El Basco was producing annual deficit of some 10,000 ptas. The uphill struggle continued until 1897, when Doña Marina withdrew from El Basco; afterwards it turned into an anodyne newspaper. The resignation marked abdication on Carlist fuerista line in the province, regretted very much by the claimant himself.

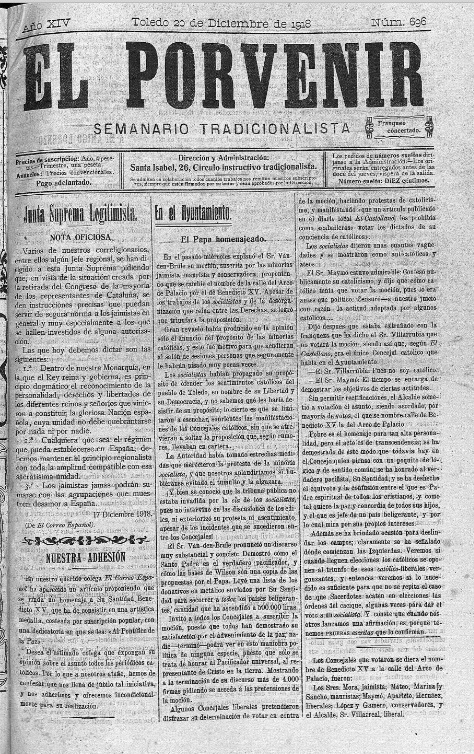
El Porvenir

After leaving El Basco Doña Marina shifted his attention to San Sebastián, where in 1898 he launched a local daily El Correo de Guipúzcoa. As its director he maintained Traditionalist profile of the paper, in the early 20th century ridiculed by opponents as "fracasado periodiquero" and representative of die-hard despotic Carlism. None of the sources consulted specifies whether Doña Marina was directing both El Basco and El Correo from Madrid or whether he lived in Bilbao and San Sebastián on the on and off basis; in case of the latter, he ceded editorial duties first to Daniel Aizpurúa and later to Román Oyarzun. Like in Biscay, also in Gipuzkoa the editorial enterprise did not last longer than a decade; at unspecified time Doña Marina withdrew, and El Correo disappeared in the early-1910s. Most authors do not associate him with any other periodical; one scholar, however, claims that in the late 1910s Doña Marina one way or another controlled a Toledo daily El Porvenir, a very ephemeral episode marked by attempt to champion a Mellista line.

== Carlist: early career ==
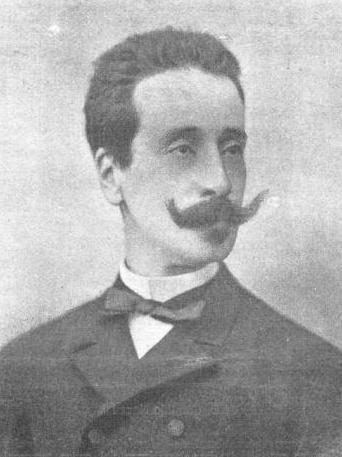
Ramón Nocedal

There were many political antecedents among Liñán's ancestors, most related to conservative realm of the Isabelline era. He seemed poised to pursue career in mainstream politics as well, but things turned out differently. The person who exercised most influence on José was his maternal grandfather José Eugenio de Eguizábal, who by the end of his life joined the Neo-Catholics and together with them neared the Carlists. Eguizábal managed to shape political outlook of the adolescent Liñán; it was furtherly reinforced by the latter's maternal uncle, José Cavanilles, who served as secretary to the legitimist claimant Carlos VII during the Third Carlist War. Moreover, during his academic period Liñán joined the entourage of Ramón Nocedal, in 1877 growing to vice-president of Juventud Católica of Madrid. As a result, he embraced Traditionalism in the most unusual period: in the aftermath of the war which produced military defeat and profound crisis of Carlism, the time marked by defections rather than by new adhesions. Liñán's 1879 edition of his grandfather's works was already a public declaration of Traditionalism.

During most of the 1880s Liñán was moderately active within Traditionalist realm and complied with its Nocedalista format, known as Integrism: in terms of organization contributing to various periodicals, giving lectures and taking part in pilgrimages rather than building party structures, in terms of theory focusing on religious fundamentalism rather than on dynastical threads. When in 1887 he assumed duties in the Nocedalista-controlled La Verdad it seemed that in a maturing internal party conflict between the intransigent Integros and the more flexible aperturistas he was firmly among the former. Indeed, La Verdad joined bitter guerra periodistica, fiercely confronting anti-Nocedalista publications. However, when in 1888 the discord erupted into an open confrontation, Liñán did not join the breakaway Integrists and opted for loyalty to the claimant Don Carlos. His motives are not entirely clear; possibly an acute and largely personal conflict with the key Biscay Integrist José de Acillona y Garay determined his choice. For the Integros Liñán was a traitor, and previously flattering references in their daily El Siglo Futuro gave way to venomous ridicule; on the other hand, Carlos VII did not hesitate to express his appreciation.

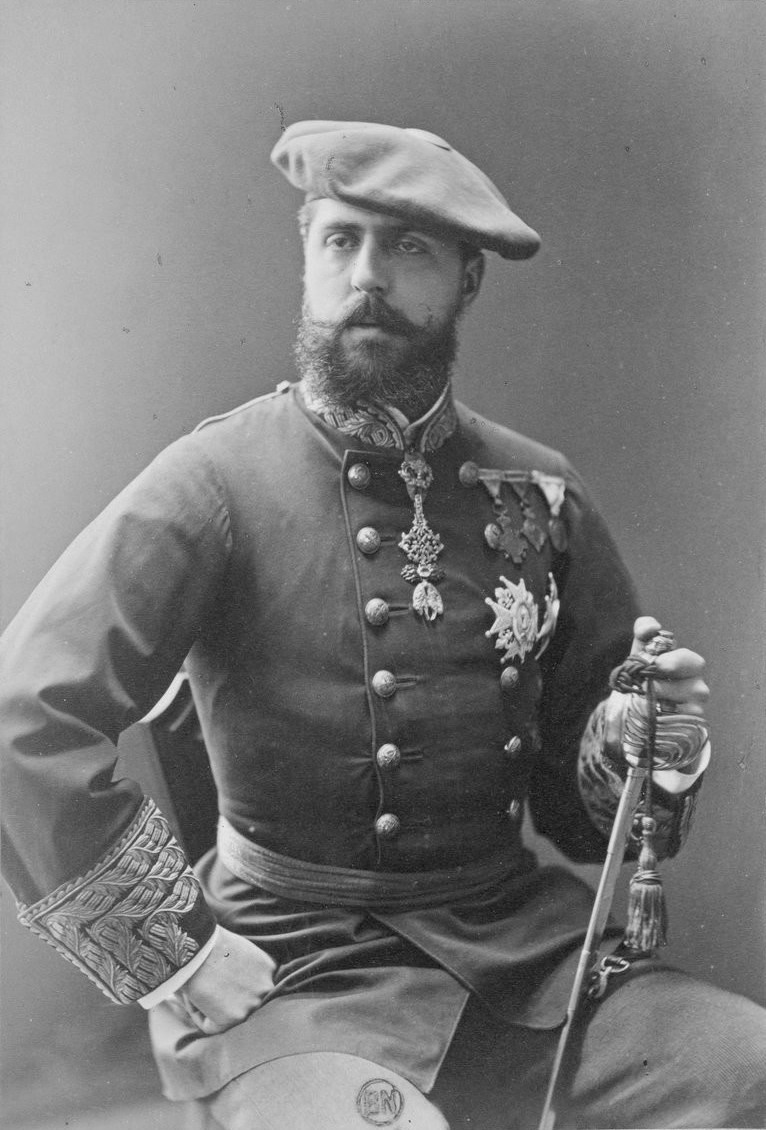
Carlos VII

At the turn of the decades Liñán got engaged in emerging formal party structures in Vascongadas, by the token of his Bilbao press engagements entering the Biscay Junta Provincial. He is noted as the most outspoken advocate of an autonomous Vascongadas organization, protesting as anti-foral the drafts which would submit local executive to the central Carlist Madrid junta; he also demanded that provincial juntas are built bottom-up, not by appointments. His endeavors were partially successful, at least in terms of preserving integrity and autonomy of the Vasco-Navarrese structures, built in the early 1890s; however, among Carlist leaders Liñán was rather isolated and depending on financial party support for his daily El Basco, he could have not afforded inflexible stand. One scholar names him the last advocate of firmly regionalist focus of the Basque Carlism.

== Carlist: support from the back seat ==
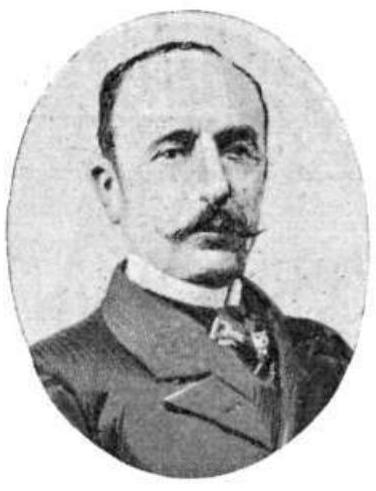
marqués de Cerralbo

In the early 1890s Carlism assumed a politically active format and the party decided to join electoral campaigns for the first time since the 1860s. Liñán, already conde de Doña Marina, is not listed as taking part. Due to family ties related to Aragón, because of his editorial duties active in the Vascongadas realm and residing permanently in Madrid, he is not mentioned as standing for the Cortes in any of those areas. At unspecified time having left the provincial Biscay executive, Doña Marina was also on the sidelines of the party organization; he did not hold any position within the Carlist structures, be it on the provincial (Madrid), regional (Castile) or national level. He did not appear on public party gatherings, clearly preferring inner-circle meetings and the role of an intellectual. His position was about mobilizing support for the cause. On the national scene he emerged as a theorist, author of erudite works which advanced Traditionalist outlook; La Jura de los Fueros (1889), La política del rey (1891), La Unidad constitucional y los Fueros (1895) and La Soberanía del Papa (1898). In Vascongadas as manager of El Correo de Guipúzcoa he advocated intransigent Catholicism and regional establishments.

Already in the mid-1890s Doña Marina forged close relationship with the new party political leader and chief architect of the activist strategy, marqués de Cerralbo. Both shared not only the Madrid residence but also aristocratic standing, interest in history and archeology, penchant for letters, passion for collecting art and generally a refined intellectual format. More importantly, they shared the vision of Carlism as a "party of order". Doña Marina was among chief exponents of the new slogan, "carlismo es una esperanza, no un temor", intended to change popular perception of the movement from a bunch of fanatic troublemakers to a respected established party. His booklet designed to demonstrate the thesis got internal awards of the Madrid Círculo. He was also active in anti-duel campaign, a rather unusual stand for member of the group typically perceived as backwater trigger-happy rednecks.

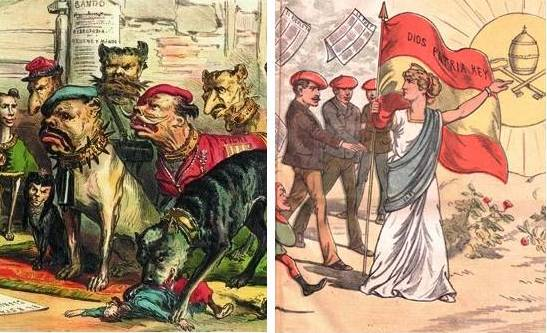
temor or esperanza?

In 1898 Doña Marina for the first time decided to compete for the Cortes; he resolved to bank on position of his family in the Teruel province, running on the Carlist ticket in two districts of Alcañiz and Valderrobres at the same time. Though in the latter he managed to build a minor coalition involving the Conservatives and even the Republicans, he lost in both constituencies. He resumed the bid from Alcañiz in 1903, again to no avail. In Gipuzkoa he restrained himself to providing propaganda support for other Carlist contenders, e.g. when fighting the Integrists and their allies from Liga Foral Autonomista. Though after 1900 de Cerralbo was forced to step down as political leader, Doña Marina remained loyal to the claimant and in 1905 was even lambasted by opponents as representative of "cesarismo carlista".

== Carlist: political climax ==
Carlist standard

Following almost 3 decades of rather modest activity within party ranks, the 1910s marked the most intense period in Doña Marina's political career. Apart from continuous work of propagandist and theorist, which earned him opinion of key writer for the cause, he became a regular contender in electoral campaigns to the Cortes. He was announced in the press as running in 1910 from Alcañiz, in 1914 from Daroca, in 1916 from Daroca (he eventually withdrew), and in 1918 again from Daroca. Though none of the above bids proved successful, he gradually emerged as forming the front line of party militants on the national scene.

Doña Marina started to assume major positions in the party structures. Within the regional Castilian organization, at that time led by Tomás Domínguez Romera, he grew to second vice-president in 1910 and at times used to replace Rodezno during his absence. In the mid-1910s assuming also jefatura of the Madrid junta provincial, in 1913 he became the first vice-president in the region of Castilla la Nueva. Finally, in early 1918 he was nominated jefe regional of New Castile.

In the 1910s Carlism was increasingly plagued by a conflict between the new claimant Don Jaime and the key party theorist Juan Vázquez de Mella, who pursued his vision of a broader ultra-conservative coalition and enjoyed cautious support of de Cerralbo. Doña Marina, impressed by de Mella since the 1890s, tended to side with latter. Already in 1911 he questioned rigid political line of the then party leader Bartolomé Feliú and advocated a possibilist strategy, suggesting that Carlist leaders assume command of Catholic opposition "sin las estrecheces de miras y criterios de Feliú". Once in 1913 his friend regained the party leadership Doña Marina became one of his closest aides, considered "semisecretario de Cerralbo" and counted among „promellistas más relevantes”.

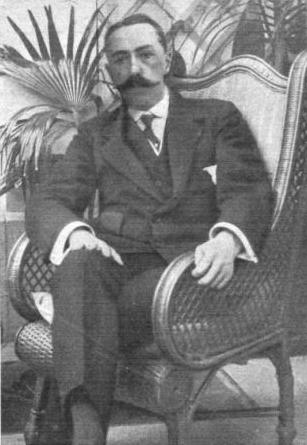
Jaime III

Events of the Great War played into the hands of de Mella and his supporters, as the claimant Don Jaime was left non-contactable in his house arrest in Austria. Doña Marina attempted to execute the ultraconservative coalition strategy in Aragón. As the conflict translated also into debate on international affairs, he used his skills to counter the aliadófilo propaganda, launched by supporters of Don Jaime. Falling short of pursuing a pro-German line Doña Marina campaigned for neutrality, especially as in 1917-1918 the odds were turning against the Central Powers and the Spanish government was tempted to declare war on Berlin. Though in 1918 he signed a venerating homage to Don Jaime, at that time he already eschewed the claimant, in a private letter noting that he "no profesa nuestro Credo, ni cumple nuestros mandamientos, ni reza nuestras oraciones, ni recibe nuestros sacramentos". When in early 1919 Don Jaime made it to Paris, the conflict with the Mellistas flared up; following brief showdown the claimant regained control of the party. De Mella and his supporters left; Doña Marina counted among their key names.

== Retiree ==
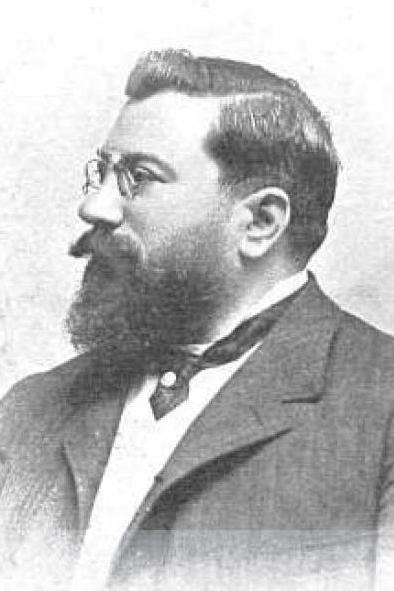
Juan Vazquez de Mella

The Mellista political project was bogged by internal controversy; while de Mella opted for a close ultra-conservative alliance, Víctor Pradera advocated a loose minimalist coalition based on the lowest common denominator. Doña Marina tended to side with the latter, though as usual he preferred to stay in the back row and is not listed among key protagonists of the disputes, taking place in the disintegrating Mellista camp at the turn of the decades. The 1923 advent of the Primo de Rivera dictatorship brought national political life to a standstill and marked an attempt to build a new system. Pradera joined the project; by a contemporary scholar Doña Marina is counted among "mellistas praderistas". There is no confirmation of him joining the primoderiverista structures, though he lent the regime his cautious support when contributing various newspaper pieces. The process climaxed in 1928; Doña Marina publicly acknowledged Alfonso XIII as a legitimate king, arguing that pledges embracing Catholic principles rendered him fit for rule also from the Traditionalist perspective. Confronting rising republican tide of the Dictablanda he limited himself to praising patriotic and monarchical values. In 1931 he organized a mass honoring the defunct Don Jaime. One author claims that in 1932 he joined the re-united Comunión Tradicionalista. If so he would have been among the oldest party patriarchs, but an official 1933 publication issued to commemorate the centenary of Carlism did not mention his name.

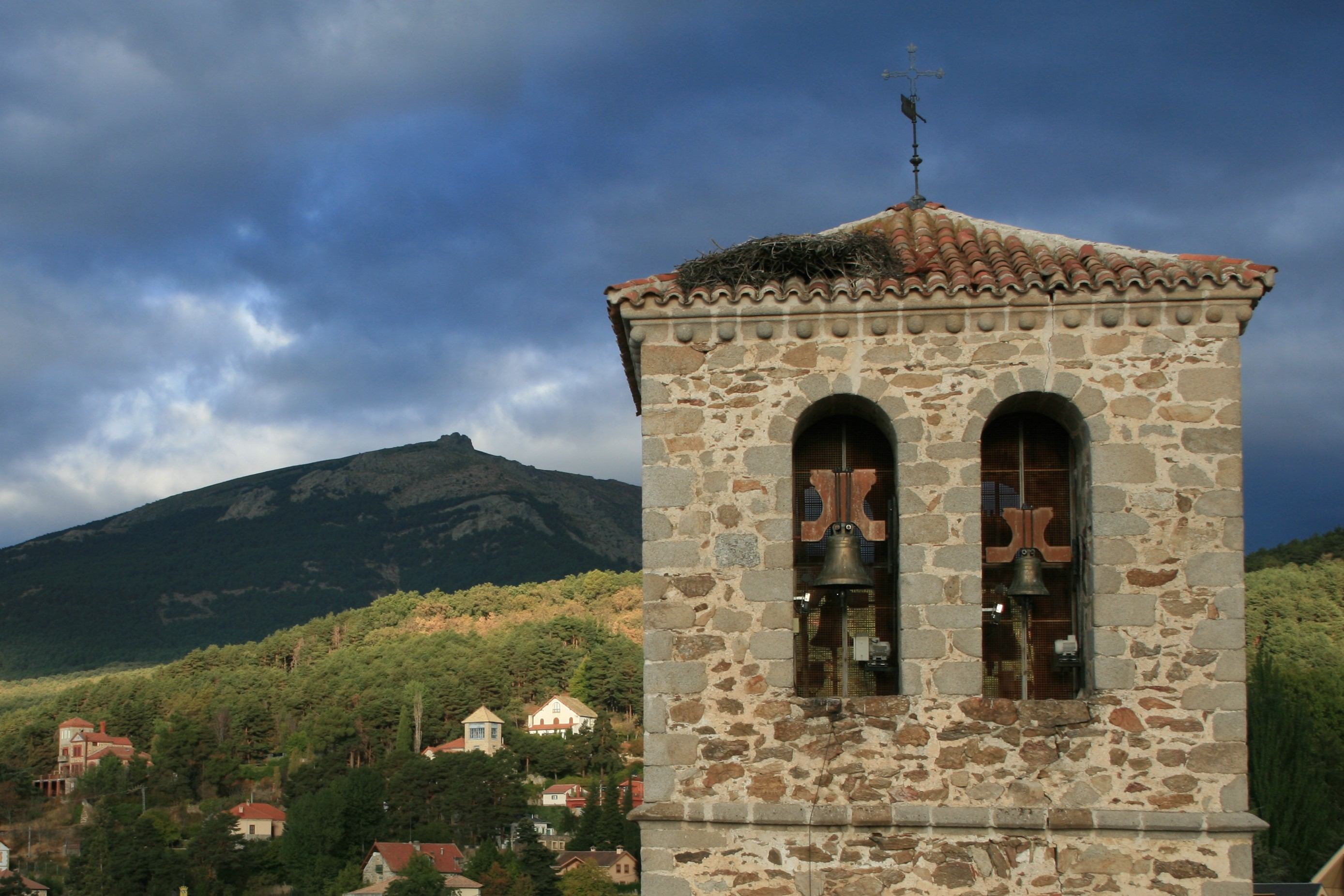
Miraflores, Liñán's mansion is the building in the bottom-left corner

Since 1911 Doña Marina was involved in Sociedad Nacional de Credito, an enterprise founded by José Larracea, the banker and father of his daughter-in-law. Upon foundation of the company he became member of SNC's concejo de administración, his name and title featuring prominently in press adverts. In the late 1910s he grew to presidency of the company, which became fairly successful on the Spanish credit market; he remained at its helm until the early 1930s. A member of numerous scientific institutions related to history and archeology, occasionally he was referred to as "academico" and "catedrático", though despite a number of attempts to land a university job in 1886-1912 no source confirms he has ever assumed academic teaching duties. Liñán spent his last years in the family residence in Miraflores de la Sierra, a town at the footsteps of Sierra de Guadarrama and a summer getaway for rich madrileños. Since 1929 a widower, he became almost blind and reduced his activity to few religious organizations. Some time in the early 1930s he ceded the Conde de Doña Marina title to his son.

== See also ==
- Carlism
- Mellismo
- El Correo de Guipúzcoa
- Pascual Liñán
