= Mellismo =

Political practice of Spanish ultra-Right of the early 20th century

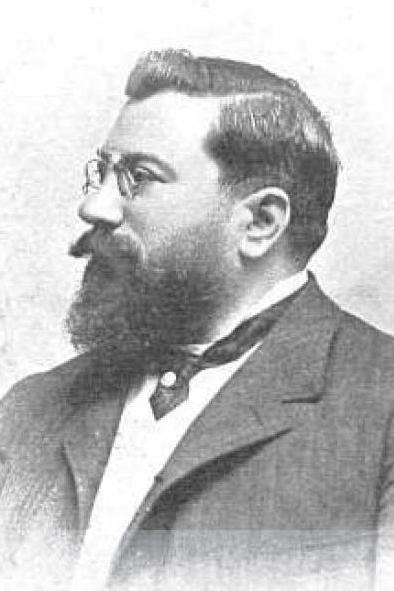
Juan Vázquez de Mella

Mellismo (Spanish: [meˈʎismo]) was a political practice of the Spanish political right in the early 20th century. Born within Carlism, it was designed and championed by Juan Vázquez de Mella, who became its independent political leader after the 1919 breakup. The strategy consisted of an attempt to build a grand ultra-Right party, which in turn would ensure transition from liberal democracy of Restauración to corporative Traditionalist monarchy. Following secession from Carlism Mellismo assumed formal shape of Partido Católico-Tradicionalista, but it failed as an amalgamating force and decomposed shortly afterwards. Mellismo refers both to the political faction led by Mella and its strategy, and Mella's theoretical conception, which is nonetheless considered an integral component of Carlist ideology. In historiography its followers are usually referred to as Mellistas, though initially the term Mellados seemed to prevail. Occasionally they are also named Tradicionalistas, but the term is extremely ambiguous and might denote also other concepts.

== Mellismo nascent (1900–1912) ==
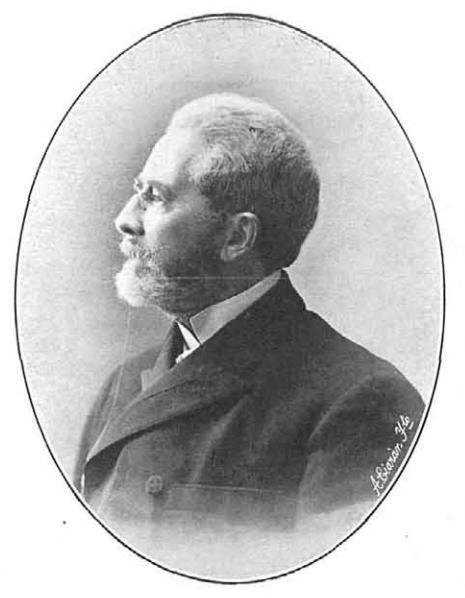
Bartolomé Feliú

Generally historiographical works do not refer to Mellismo or to Mellistas prior to 1910; press of the era started to use this term as late as 1919. When discussing internal groupings within Carlism in the early years of the 20th century, scholars refer to the faction more inclined towards alliances with other parties as "posibilistas", while those tending to side with a deposed leader marqués de Cerralbo are dubbed "cerralbistas"; this is also how Vázquez de Mella preferred to refer to himself. However, he started to gain supporters and admirers of his own already in the 1890s, initially lured by his charismatic oratory skills rather than by his theoretical vision or specific political strategy. In fact, his stand might have seemed puzzling: he declared himself enemy of the Restoration system but advocated political alliances with established parties, enthusiastically took part in electoral game but was engaged in conspiracy to stage military coup in 1898–1900, supported minimalist electoral coalitions but preached maximalist objectives, claimed doctrinal Traditionalist orthodoxy but remained in uneasy relationship with the king and revealed cautious penchant towards non-dynastical solutions.

After "La Octubrada", a series of minor Carlist 1900 revolts, Mella sought refuge in Portugal and remained there for a few years, estranged also by the claimant who officially dubbed those involved traitors. Having obtained royal pardon in 1903 he resumed parliamentarian career in 1905. As Carlist leaders were usually in their 60s or older, Vázquez de Mella emerged as the most dynamic representative of mid-age generation and most charismatic Carlist politician at all, as a theorist presiding over general overhaul of Carlism. His position consolidated mostly thanks to harangues delivered both in the Cortes and at public gatherings; he did not hold official party positions except in its press tribune, El Correo Español. His personal prestige soon became sort of a problem for both the claimant and the then political leader, Matías Barrio y Mier, appointed to keep the Cerralbistas in check. On orders of Carlos VII Barrio pursued cautious policy of electoral alliances, confronting possibilist vision of malmenorismo-guided coalitions and trying to curb Vázquez de Mella's influence in Correo. As one of his last political decisions in 1909 the claimant appointed a relatively unknown academic, Bartolomé Feliú y Pérez, as successor of the ailing Barrio; the decision came as a blow to supporters of de Mella, considering him obvious candidate for leadership.

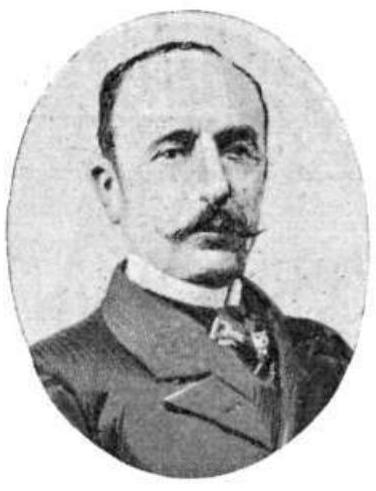
marqués de Cerralbo

Following death of Carlos VII his son as the new Carlist king Jaime III found himself pressed by the Cerralbistas to dismiss Feliú; he opted for a compromise, confirming the nomination but appointing Mella as his own personal secretary. After few months the two spent together in 1910 Vázquez de Mella ceased, disillusioned – rather mutually – with his new monarch. During the Cortes campaign of 1910 Mellismo first emerged as a strategy: while Feliú authorized local accords strictly conditioned by dynastic claims, Vázquez de Mella mounted an anti-revolutionary, ultra-conservative, Catholic coalition with Antonio Maura and his faction of the Conservatives. During the next 2 years the group already dubbed Mellistas sabotaged Jefe Delegado, their campaign directed against Feliú as incompetent leader and steering clear of the alliance question. In 1912 Mella accused Feliú of illegitimately holding the jefatura and demanded his deposition, threatening the claimant with rejecting his rule as deprived of "legitimacy of execution". Don Jaime gave in and by the end of 1912 he re-appointed de Cerralbo as president of Junta Superior.

== In full swing (1912–1919) ==
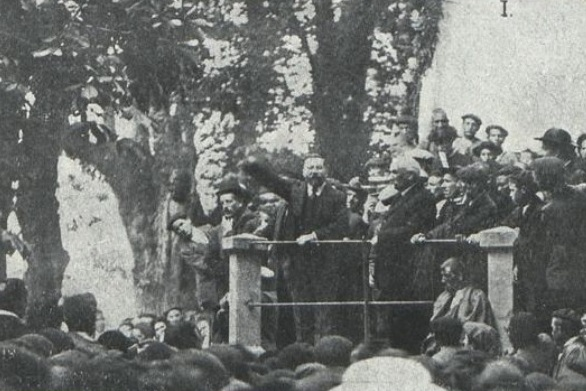
de Mella speaking, 1912

Some scholars claim that with de Cerralbo increasingly fascinated by Vázquez de Mella though also aging, tired of conflict and irresolute, the latter assumed actual command of party structures, while Carlist policy was increasingly formed by Mellismo. The parliamentarian contingent was clearly dominated by Vázquez de Mella's personality; nearly half of its members were Mellistas anyway, the other ones mostly vacillating and only Feliú and Llorens prepared to take a decisive stand. In the 30-member party top body, Junta Superior, around one third were leaning towards Mellismo, including regional jefes of Vascongadas, Catalonia and Valencia. As de Cerralbo re-organized the national executive forming 10 dedicated sections, Mella monopolized the ones of propaganda and press while other Mellistas dominated in electoral and organization ones. El Correo Español kept having been a battlefield with Don Jaime struggling to retain his influence, but it was getting increasingly dominated by Mellistas, especially Peñaflor.

With Don Jaime hardly contactable in Austria following outbreak of the Great War, the Mellistas took almost full control of the party; the Carlist Cortes campaigns of 1914, 1916 and 1918 were visibly marked by Mellista-nurtured long-term strategy. With dramatically declining turnover at the polls and growing fragmentation of two partidos turnistas, it was becoming evident that political system of Restauración was crumbling. Mella nurtured a plan for minimalist alliance of the Right, leading in turn to emergence of a maximalist ultra-Right party, possibly a new incarnation of Traditionalism. That formation was supposed to do away with liberal democracy – a strategy dubbed by some scholars as "catastrofismo" – and ensure passage to Traditionalist, corporative system, with dynastical question parked in obscurity. Though in 1914 provincial jefes were largely left free to conclude any electoral alliances that might produce best possible results, Vázquez de Mella and Maura kept working that they took form of Carlist-Maurist accords. During the 1916 campaign Vázquez de Mella for the first time explicitly referred to a future union of extrema derecha, new terms like "mauro-mellistas", "mauro-jaimistas" or "carlomauristas" entered into circulation and Maura started to make vague anti-system references of altering "ambiente de la vida pública". The strategy, however, demonstrated its limitations. Alliances did not outlive electoral campaigns; Jaimist candidates kept winning around 10 mandates, hardly an impressive improvement compared to the 1890s or 1900s; finally, in regions with strong local identity some party militants grumbled that fuerismo might suffer in a hypothetical ultra-Right alliance.

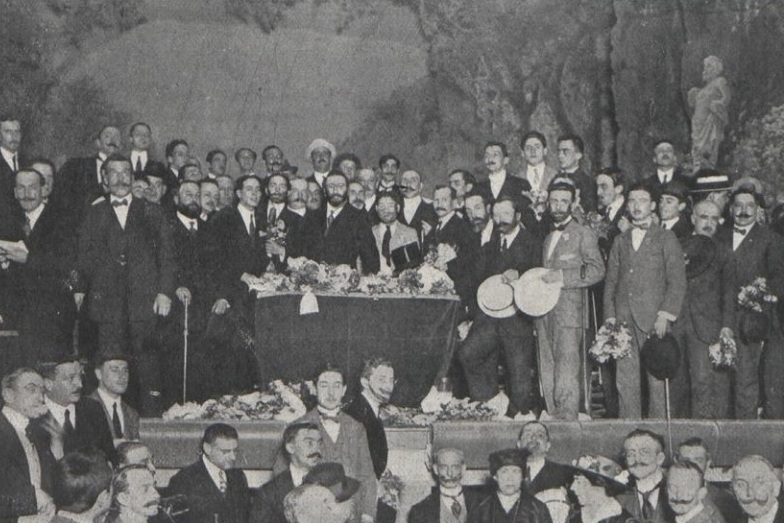
famous de Mella's pro-German address, Zarzuela theatre, 1915

Following outbreak of the Great War earlier demonstrated pro-German Mellist sympathies turned into a full-blown campaign. Though booklets or lectures technically supported Spanish neutrality, they raised sentiment favoring Central Powers and aimed against Britain. After 1916, when pro-Entente feelings were gaining strength, the focus of Mellistas shifted to preventing a would-be Spanish joining the Allies. The claimant, during most of the war unreachable in his Austrian residence, remained ambiguous; officially he supported neutrality, in private leaning towards Entente and sending notes not disavowing pro-German tones of the Mellistas. Scholars differ as to how the World War One issue related to Mellismo. Very few consider it central and even reduce the outlook to pro-German stance. Most suggest that it stemmed from ideological Mellista vision, quote passages praising anti-Liberal German regime and lambasting Masonic, democratic, parliamentarian British and French systems. Some comments suggest that victory of the Central Powers was expected to facilitate takeover of Spanish political scene by extreme Right, while there are students who suggest that the war issue was of no relevance at all.

== 1919 breakup ==
In 1918 Mellismo seemed to have been losing ground: electoral alliances failed to produce major gains, course of the Great War made pro-German attitude pointless and undermined position of its advocates, some regional jefaturas kept voicing dissent and de Cerralbo, increasingly tired of his own double-loyalty, finally managed to get his resignation accepted, temporarily replaced by another Mellista, Cesáreo Sanz Escartín. In early 1919 the claimant was released from his house arrest in Austria, arrived in Paris and after 2 years of almost total silence came out with 2 manifestos. In somewhat unclear circumstances published in early February in Correo Español, they explicitly denounced disobedience of unnamed Carlist leaders failing to sustain neutral policy and indicated that command structures of the party would be re-organized.

The Mellistas concluded that the strategy employed previously in struggle for domination in the party – cornering the claimant to elicit his conformity – would no longer work and that an ultimate all-out confrontation was imminent. They mounted a media counter-offensive, going public with charges disseminated privately in 1912 and presenting Don Jaime as a ruler who lost his legitimacy: for years he remained passive and inactive, pursued hypocritical policy declaring neutrality but in fact supporting Entente, departed from Catholic orthodoxy, ignored traditional Carlist collegial bodies embarking on Cesarist policy, toyed with the party and – clear reference to his lack of offspring – behaved irresponsibly; all in all, his latest moves were nothing but a "Jaimada", a coup within and against Traditionalism. None of the conflicting parties referred to the question of political strategy as to the point of contention.

Though initially it might have appeared that the strengths of both sides were comparable, Don Jaime soon tilted the balance in his favor. His men reclaimed control over El Correo Español and he replaced San Escartín with former germanophile politicians who seemed pro-Mellistas but turned loyal to the royal house, first Pascual Comín and then Luis Hernando de Larramendi. When Alfonsist and Liberal press cheered anticipated demise of conflict-ridden Carlism, many party members earlier demonstrating unease about Don Jaime started to have second thoughts. Vázquez de Mella, conscious of his strong position among MPs and local jefes, responded with a call to stage a grand assembly. Though he explicitly referred to Carlism and Traditionalism, some scholars claim that at that point he already acknowledged that the struggle to control Jaimist structures was pointless; they interpret this appeal as decision to walk out and build a new party. The showdown lasted no longer than two weeks. By the end of February 1919 the Mellistas opted for an own organization, setting Centro de Acción Tradicionalista as their temporary headquarters in Madrid.

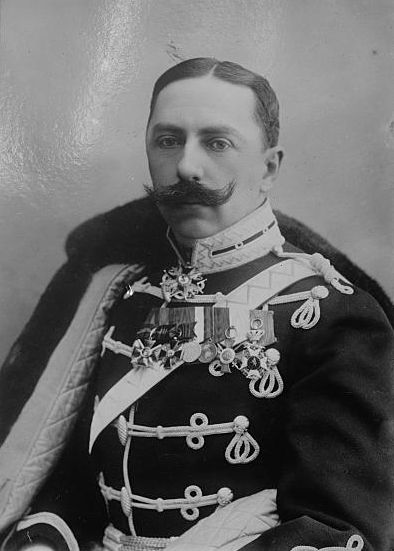
Jaime de Borbón

Many Carlist deputies and senators of the early 20th century turned Mellados: apart from Vázquez de Mella also Luis Garcia Guijarro, Dalmacio Iglesias García, José Ampuero y del Rio, Cesáreo Sanz Escartín, Ignacio Gonzales de Careaga and Víctor Pradera Larumbe; among regional leaders the key to be mentioned were Tirso de Olazábal, José María Juaristi, marqués de Valde-Espina and Luis and Manuel Lezama Leguizamón (Vascongadas), Antonio Mazarrasa (Alava), Doña Marina and Florida (New Castile), Teodoro de Mas, Miguel Salellas Ferrer, Tomás Boada Borrell and duque de Solferino (Catalonia), Manuel Simó Marín and Jaime Chicharro Sánchez-Guió (Valencia) and José Díez de la Cortina (Andalusia); the group was completed by two prolific journalists, Miguel Fernández (Peñaflor) and Claro Abánades Lopez. Most of the breakaways came from 2 regions: Vascongadas (especially Gipuzkoa) and Catalonia. Some of regional Jaimist dailies adhered to Mella, though the most important ones, El Correo Español, El Pensamiento Navarro and El Correo Catalán, stood by the claimant. The impact on the rank-and-file was far less material. In regions where Carlism was a minor force, like Old Castile or Valencia, the breakup added to confusion and further marginalisation of the movement, but in Vascongadas, Navarre and Catalonia the rural social base of Carlism remained mostly intact.

== Reformatting and crisis (1919–1922) ==
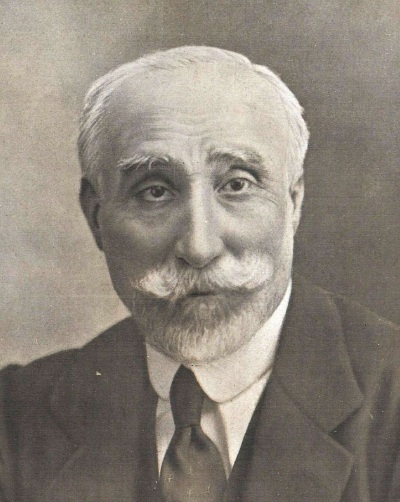
Antonio Maura

During 1919 the Mellistas were busy institutionalizing the movement. Its backbone were local Centros de Acción Tradicionalista, emergent throughout the country; in Madrid El Pensamiento Español was set up as the national press tribune and there were also attempts to build an affiliated youth and shirt organization, Juventudes y Requetés Tradicionalistas. Though Mella rejected a ministerial post in a new government of national unity, claiming he could never align himself with the 1876 constitution and its system, in May Mellismo assumed shape of Centro Católico Tradicionalista, set up before the 1919 elections and intended as a stepping stone towards an ultra-Right alliance dominated by the Traditionalists. Not constrained by dynastic Carlist bounds any more though rejecting also the Alfonsist monarchy as corrupted by Liberalism, CCT was an attempt to use Catholic platform to lure right-wing offshoots from the Conservative Party, mostly the Mauristas and the Ciervistas. Other potential alliances reported were those with the Integrists and Unión Monárquica Nacional. The elections produced 4 mandates; Mella himself failed to gain a ticket.

Since the summer of 1919 the Mellistas started to gear up for a grand Asamblea Nacional, supposed to launch a new party and set its political course; though "Católico Nacional" was considered as the party name, it eventually materialized as Partido Católico-Tradicionalista. Regional Mellista gatherings were staged in the Biscay Archanda (August 1919) and in the Catalan Badalona (April 1920). However, as the new 1920 electoral campaign unfolded it was getting evident that like before, different groupings of the Right were ready to conclude circumstantial deals, but none was willing to enter integration path towards a new party of ultra derecha. Different Mellista personalities were getting inclined to pursue alliance talks on their own, usually purely pragmatic basis: some like Pradera negotiated with the Mauristas, some like Chicharro talked to the Ciervistas, some were approaching the social-Catholic initiative of former Vázquez de Mella sympathizers Aznar and Minguijón and some neared a monarchist Catholic idea advocated by El Debate. The elections produced mere 2 Mellista mandates; Vázquez de Mella, who lost again, soon launched his bid for seat in Tribunal Supremo, but failed to mount sufficient support among conservative parties and suffered prestigious defeat.

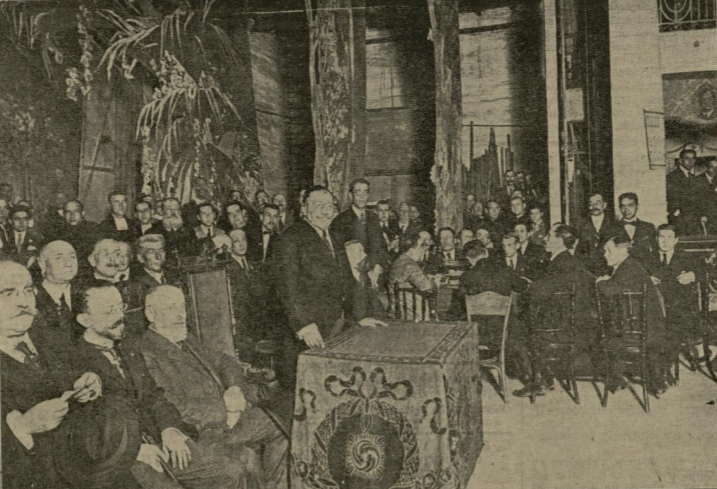
Mella speaking at Barcelona's teatro Goya (1921)

In late 1920 it was already clear that Mellismo is stalled, failing to gain ground on national political scene and getting increasingly paralyzed by two competing strategies. While Vázquez de Mella stuck to his plan of grand extreme-Right federation, at least partially committed to maximalist Traditionalist vision, Pradera emerged as champion of another concept, namely that alliance should be concluded on a minimalist basis, the lowest common denominator having been conservative anti-revolutionary Catholicism. Furthermore, Vázquez de Mella pursued an anti-system and non-dynastical strategy, at best ready to support an acceptable government from the outside, while Pradera was prepared to work within the Restoration Alfonsist framework and to accept jobs in governmental structures. Mellismo suffered another blow when many of its followers joined Partido Social Popular. In 1921 Vázquez de Mella was already in doubt as to launching an own party and seemed pondering upon his role of an ideological pundit providing guidance from the back seat.

== Demise (1922 and after) ==
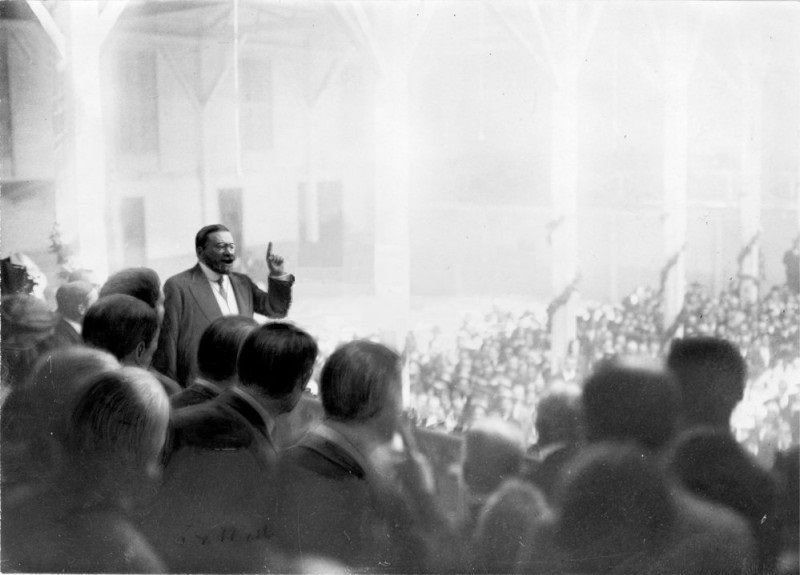
de Mella speaking

The long overdue grand Mellist assembly eventually materialized in October 1922 in Zaragoza, though it was anything but what Vázquez de Mella had originally intended. Many Mellistas who broke with Don Jaime almost 4 years earlier had departed for other political initiatives in the meantime, others lost enthusiasm following 2 unsuccessful electoral campaigns and disillusioned by the movement having been stuck with apparent loss of direction, little progress on path towards a Rightist alliance and Vázquez de Mella increasingly withdrawing into long periods of inactivity. The gathering was dominated by the Praderistas and Vázquez de Mella himself did not attend; instead he sent a letter, boiling down to his political last will. Once again reasserting his anti-system views he confirmed Traditionalist monarchy as an ultimate goal and declared himself committed to work towards it as theorist and ideologue, though not as a politician any more. Members of the presidency acknowledged the letter and politely declared themselves looking forward to reversal of Vázquez de Mella's decision; the assembly ended in favor of setting up a new Catholic party.

The Zaragoza assembly was effectively the funeral of Mellismo, even though in the last Restauración elections of 1923 there were two candidates successfully running on the Catholic-Traditionalist ticket. During almost a year following the Zaragoza meeting further Vázquez de Mella followers joined other political initiatives. In 1923 national party life came to a standstill once Primo de Rivera dictatorship was declared and all political organizations were dissolved; likewise, Partido Católico-Tradicionalista ceased to exist. Some Mellistas engaged in primoderiverista structures: few of them assumed high administrative positions and Pradera emerged even as dictatorship's iconic figure, but scholars do not agree whether that activity had anything to do with Mellismo. There are students who claim that Mellistas "headed by Pradera" engaged in Unión Patriotica and reconciled with the Alfonsine monarchy, pointing to gradual demise of the group only after the Vázquez de Mella's death. Other authors consider Mellismo defunct as political grouping and at best refer to "seudotradicionalismo" or "mellistas praderistas", underlining only loose association with original "mellismo ortodoxo". Some dub the co-operative strategy “Praderismo” and note that co-operation with the Primo regime, deprived of any ideological backbone let alone a Traditionalist one, had little to do with Mellism.

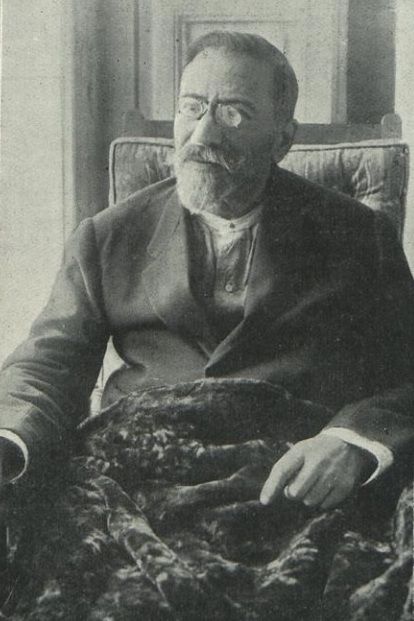
de Mella, 1928

Vázquez de Mella withdrew into privacy; his last public appearance was in 1924 and he died in 1928. In 1931-1932 many former Vázquez de Mella followers re-united with mainstream Carlism joining Comunión Tradicionalista; this is probably the last moment to which some historians apply the term Mellists, though others are more cautious and prefer to refer to post-mellistas. Within the Comunión structures the former Mellists did not form any visible grouping or faction, though there are scholars who claim that during the Second Spanish Republic and the Spanish Civil War some of the Mellist-Jaimist divisions got reproduced as a pattern. In non-scholarly public dispute the term "mellistas" is at times used in most arbitrary and whimsical circumstances, e.g. to denote pro-Nazi Spaniards of the Second World War.

== Reception and legacy ==
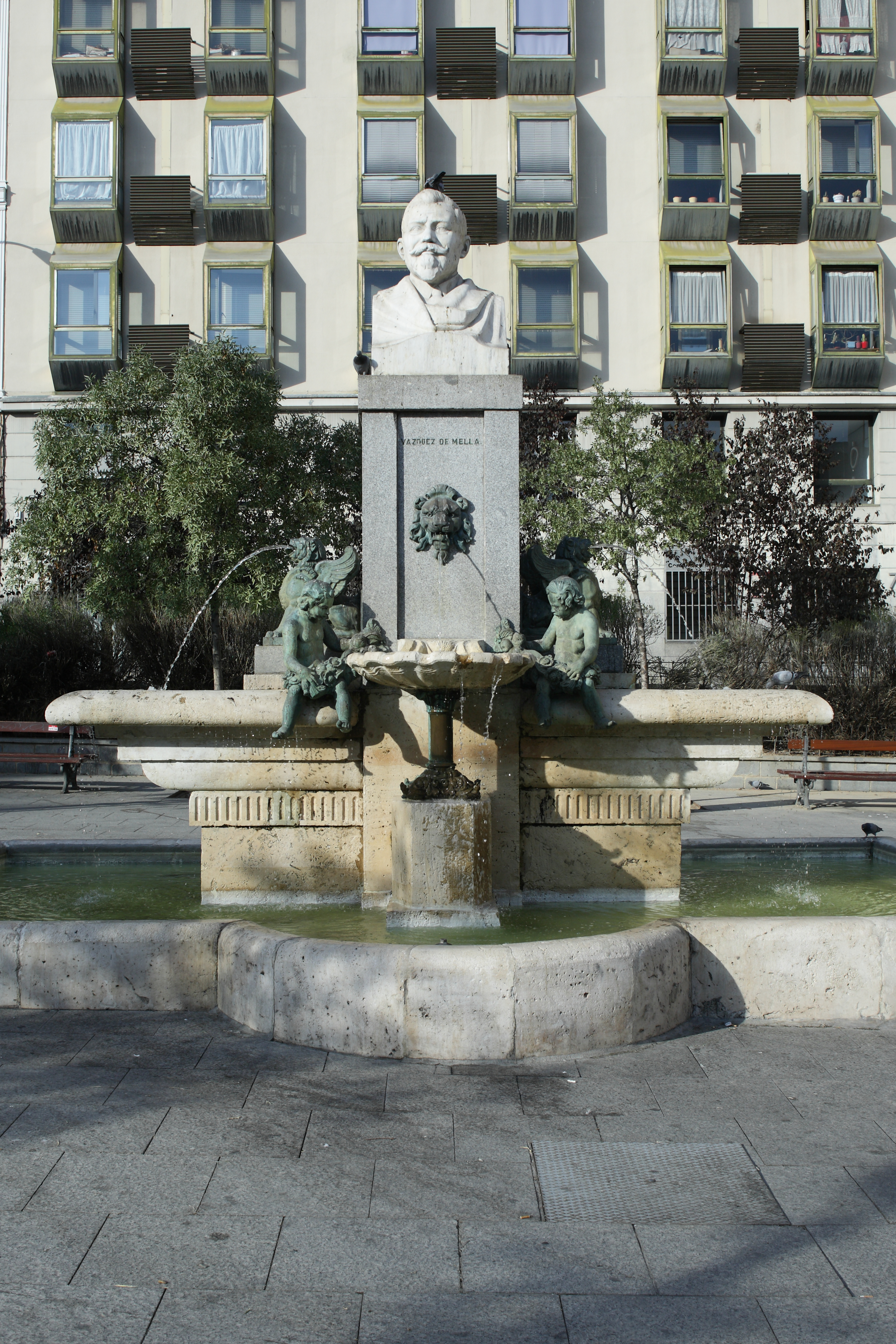
Mella monument, Madrid

Theoretical work of Mella served as point of reference for generations and was studied far beyond Spain, from Chile or the United States to Poland. However, it is universally approached as intrinsic part of Traditionalist doctrine, not infrequently presented as its most refined, in-depth, and systematic component, in fact the climax of Traditionalist political philosophy. The term "Mellismo" is not applied to it, used only as reference to political strategy pursued by Vázquez de Mella and his followers; as such, it generated far lesser interest.

In historiography until the late 20th century the Mellistas were acknowledged mostly in works dealing with different dimensions of Carlism. The authors tended to focus on the 1919 breakup, sometimes portrayed as another one in long history of ruptures in the movement; the secession was presented as resulting either from clash of personalities or from conflicting views on Spanish stand during the First World War. It was the first major monograph, published in 2000, which systematically re-defined Mellismo as a strategy to build an ultra-Right formation leading the transition from liberal democracy of late Restauración to corporative Traditionalist monarchy. According to this theory, the grouping envisaged was supposed to consist of three tiers: complete amalgamation based on common program, federation with those who accepted it partially, and circumstantial co-operation with other groups.

Apart from origins of the 1919 rupture, there are questions pertaining to other issues which remain unanswered. It is not clear whether Mella intended to take over Carlism by reducing the claimant to a decorative role or whether he consciously aimed at a secession. It remains to be traced how a question of foreign policy, usually of secondary importance for most political parties, managed to trigger a schism, especially given in 1919 the war was over and Carlism has always demonstrated little interest, if not indeed contempt, for anything beyond the borders of Spain. One may ask how come that Mellism was potent enough to devastate one of the oldest European political movements but it proved entirely ineffective as a project on its own. There are questions pertaining to the time frame, namely whether Vázquez de Mella's grip on Carlism prior to 1919 and co-operation with primoderiverista institutions after 1923 count as Mellismo. Explanation is yet to be provided as to motives of personalities who were iconic for their loyalty to Carlist kings, but decided to join the Mellistas, like it was the case of Tirso Olazábal.

some key Mellists (listed if picture available)
Abánades López	Chicharro Sanchez	Doña Marina	Garcia Guijarro	Iglesias García	Luis Lezama	Cortina	Olazábal Lardizábal	(M) Oreja	Florida	(R) Oreja	Simó Marín	Solferino	Valde-Espina	Sanz Escartín

== See also ==
- Anglophobia
- Carlism
- Electoral Carlism (Restoration)
- Jaime, Duke of Madrid
- Juan Vázquez de Mella
