= La Correspondencia (newspaper) =

Puerto Rican newspaper

La Correspondencia is a defunct Spanish-language newspaper published in Puerto Rico and founded by Ramón B. López in San Juan on 18 December 1890. La Correspondencia de Puerto Rico became the largest circulating daily newspaper in Puerto Rico with a print run of 5,000 copies a day.

== See also ==
- List of newspapers in Puerto Rico
