= La Correspondencia Militar =

Spanish Newspaper

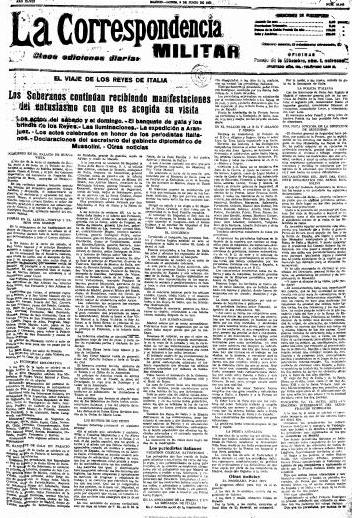
- Type: Daily newspaper
- Founder: Emilio Prieto Villarreal
- Founded: 1877
- Ceased publication: 1932
- Language: Spanish
- City: Madrid
- Country: Spain
- Circulation: 15,950 (as of 1913)
- ISSN: 1132-6441
- OCLC number: 436625960

La Correspondencia Militar (The Military Correspondence), also known as La Correspondencia, was a daily newspaper published in Madrid from 1877 to 1932. During its existence it maintained a hawkish editorial line favorable to the Spanish Army.

== History ==
La Correspondencia Militar was founded in 1877 by Commander Emilio Prieto Villarreal. It was published Monday through Saturday, with an illustrated Sunday supplement named Militares y Paisanos (Military and Countrymen). It had an initial circulation of 4,000.

Its ideology was hawkish toward all colonial wars of the late 19th century, in addition to its political conservatism and defense of the Army's corporatist interests. In particular it conducted a campaign in defense of the Law of Jurisdictions in 1909. By 1913 it had a circulation of 15,950. During World War I it opted for a Germanophile position. In 1917 it became the de facto mouthpiece for the Juntas de Defensa. Its previous director, Commander Julio Amado, gave way to Evaristo Romero at the head of the publication, although Amado continued to guide its ideology. In the 1920s the paper's circulation dropped considerably.

At the suggestion of the regime of Alfonso XIII and the dictator Miguel Primo de Rivera, the Mallorcan entrepreneur Juan March contributed 100,000 pesetas to shore up the newspaper's finances. However, seeing that it was a ruinous business, March put an end to his assistance in November 1926.

In 1928 La Correspondencia Militar was merged with another pro-military paper, El Ejército Español, of ultraconservative ideology, founded in 1888. It was one of the few publications of its type that survived the establishment of the Second Republic. By 1932, it was simply titled La Correspondencia. Its director in the Republican period was Lieutenant Colonel Emilio Rodríguez Tarduchy. Its articles frequently attacked the Republic, which earned it several suspensions. It ceased publication in 1932.
