= Gaetano =

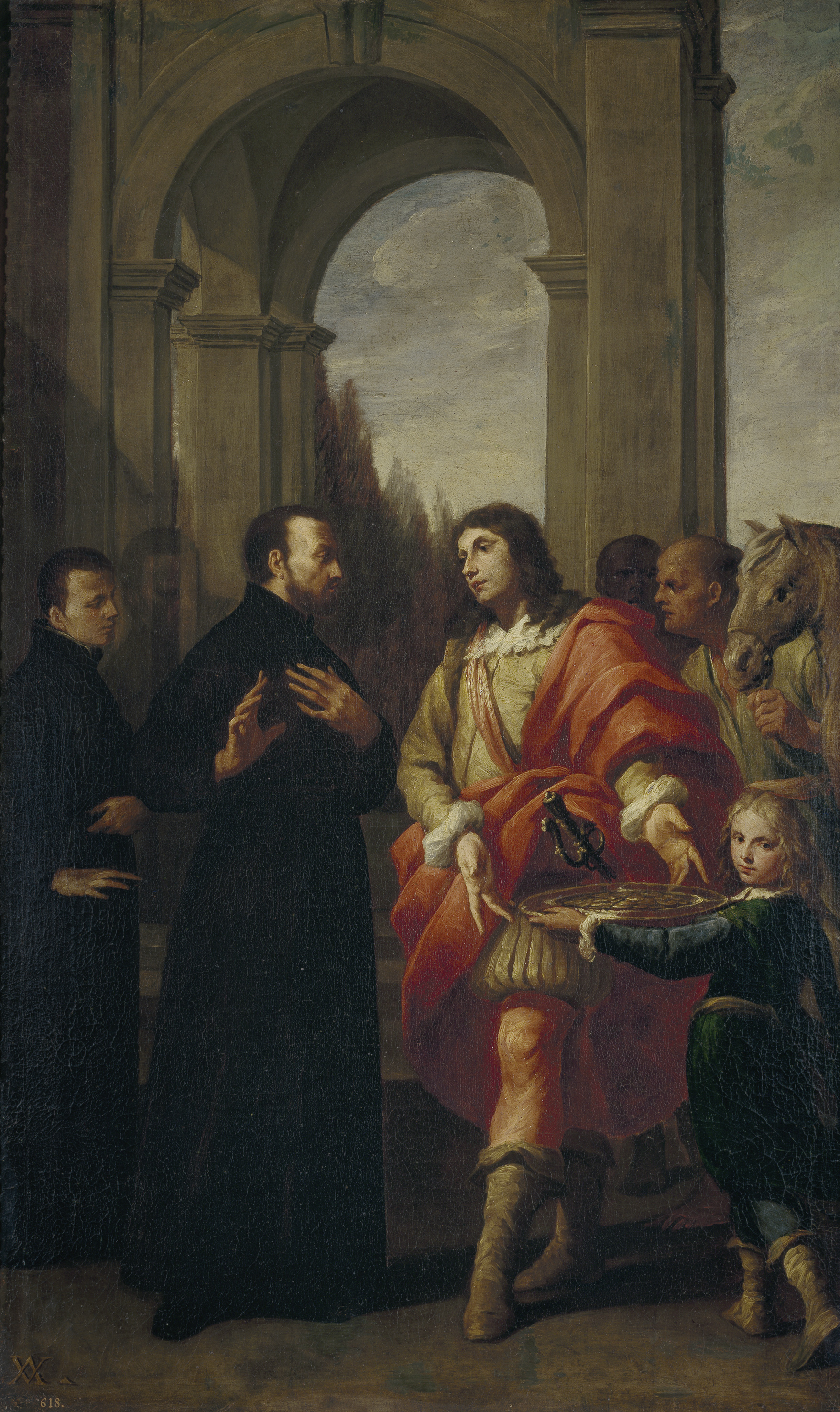
- Saint Gaetano
- Pronunciation: IPA: [ɡaeˈtaːno]

Origin
- Meaning: "from Caieta" (now Gaeta)

Other names
- Related names: Gaétan, Caetano, Cayetano, Gaetana, Cayetana

Gaetano (anglicized Cajetan) is an Italian masculine given name. It is derived from the Latin Caietanus, meaning "from Caieta" (the modern Gaeta). The given name has been in use in Italy since the medieval period, although it also remained in use as a byname indicating people from Gaeta, as in Thomas Cajetan or Gaetanus (1469–1534). The modern given name can be traced to Saint Gaetano dei Conti di Tiene (1480–1547) who was canonized in 1671. Other variants of the name exist in other Romance languages; the French form of the name is Gaétan, the Portuguese form is Caetano, and the Spanish form is Cayetano. The feminine form is Gaetana (also Caetana and Cayetana).

People with the given name include:

== Academics ==
- Gaetano Borriello (1958–2015), Italian-American computer scientist
- Gaetano Cozzi (1922–2001), Italian historian
- Gaetano Crocco (1877-1968), Italian space scientist, aeronautics pioneer and founder of the Italian Rocket Society
- Gaetano De Sanctis (1870–1957), historian and senator
- Gaetano Kanizsa (1913–1993), Italian psychologist and perception scientist
- Gaetano Milanesi (1813–1895), Italian scholar and writer
- Gaetano Savi (1769–1844), Italian naturalist, botanist and mycologist
- Gaetano da Thiene (philosopher) (1387–1465)

== Arts and entertainment ==
- Gaetano Aronica (born 1963), Italian actor
- Gaetano Berenstadt (1687–1734), Italian alto castrato
- Gaetano Braga (1829–1907), Italian composer and cellist
- Gaetano Brunetti (1744–1798), prolific Italian composer
- Gaetano Bruno (born 1973), Italian actor
- Gaetano Castelli (born 1938), Italian painter and set designer
- Gaetano Chiaveri (c. 1689–1770), Italian architect
- Gaetano Donizetti (1797–1848), Italian opera composer
- Gaetano Gallino (1804–1884), Italian painter and photographer
- Gaetano Gandolfi (1734–1802), Bolognese painter
- Gaetano Greco (c. 1657–1728), Italian Baroque composer
- Gaetano Guadagni (1729–1792), Italian mezzo-soprano castrato singer
- Gaetano Lapis (1704–1776), Italian painter
- Guy Lombardo (1902–1977), Canadian bandleader
- Gaetano Martoriello (circa 1680–1733), Italian painter
- Gaten Matarazzo (born 2002), American actor
- Gaetano Merola (1881–1953), Italian conductor
- Gaetano Pesce (1939–2024), Italian architect and designer
- Gaetano Polidori (1764–1853), Italian writer and scholar
- Gaetano Pollastri (1886–1960), Italian violinist turned violin maker and restorer
- Gaetano Previati (1852–1920), Italian painter and art theorist
- Gaetano Pugnani (1731–1798), Italian violinist
- Gaetano Sabatini (1703–1734), Italian draftsman and painter
- Gaetano Saracco (1856–1922), Italian dancer and choreographer
- Gaetano Sgarabotto (1878–1959), Italian violinmaker
- Gaetano Trentanove (1858–1937), Italian-American sculptor
- Gaetano Varcasia (1959–2014), Italian voice actor
- Gaetano Zompini (1700–1778), Italian printmaker and engraver
- Gaetano Giulio Zumbo (1656-1701), Italian sculptor

== Crime ==
- Gaetano Badalamenti (1923–2004), powerful member of the Sicilian Mafia
- Gaetano Gianola, early 20th century Italian-American mobster
- Gaetano Lococo (1895–1993), Italian-American mobster
- Gaetano Reina (1889–1930), Sicilian-American mobster

== Politics, the law and journalism ==
- Gaetano Arfé (1925–2007), Italian politician, historian and journalist
- Gaetano Bresci (1869–1901), Italian-American anarchist who assassinated King Umberto I of Italy
- Gaetano Filangieri, 5th Prince of Satriano (1753–1788), Italian jurist and philosopher
- Gaetano Giuliano (1929–2023), Italian politician
- Gaetano Manfredi (born 1964), Italian politician
- Gaetano Martino (1900–1967), Italian politician
- Gaetano Morazzoni (1932–2025), Italian politician
- Gaetano Mosca (1858–1941), Italian political scientist, journalist and public servant
- Gaetano Polverelli (1886–1960), Italian journalist and politician
- Gaetano Salvemini (1873–1957), Italian anti-fascist politician, historian and writer
- Gaetano Saya (born 1956), Italian politician
- Gaetano Tanti (1956/1957–2023), Maltese trade unionist

== Religion ==
- Gaetano dei Conti di Tiene (1480–1547), Catholic saint
- Gaetano Alibrandi (1914–2003), Catholic archbishop
- Gaetano Bedini (1806–1864), Italian Catholic ecclesiastic, cardinal and diplomat
- Gaetano Bisleti (1856–1937), Catholic cardinal
- Gaetano Catanoso (1879–1963), Italian parish priest
- Gaetano Cicognani (1881–1962), Italian Catholic prelate
- Gaetano Pace Forno (1809–1874), Maltese Catholic bishop
- Gaetano Moroni (1802–1883), Italian Catholic official and writer about the Catholic Church
- Gaetano Sanseverino (1811–1865), Italian philosopher and theologian

== Sports ==
- Gaetano Berardi (born 1988), Swiss footballer
- Gaetano Belloni (1892–1980), Italian road racing cyclist
- Gaétan Boucher (born 1958), Canadian speed skater
- Gaetano Caridi (born 1980), Italian footballer
- Gaetano D'Agostino (born 1982), Italian footballer
- Gaetano De Rosa (born 1973), Italian footballer
- Gaetano Fontana (born 1970), Italian footballer
- Gaetano Giallanza (born 1974), Swiss footballer
- Gaetano Orlando (born 1962), Italian-Canadian ice hockey player
- Gaetano Scirea (1953–1989), Italian footballer
- Gaetano Starrabba (born 1932), Italian racing driver
- Gaetano Vasari (born 1970), Italian footballer
- Gaetano Vastola (born 1978), Italian footballer

== Other fields ==
- Gaetano Baccani (1792–1867), Italian architect
- Gaetano Casati (1838–1902), Italian explorer of Africa
- Gaetano Gagliano (1917–2016), Canadian businessman
