= Gaétan =

Male given name

Gaëtan or Gaétan is a recent French first name derived from the Italian Gaetano, meaning "from Gaèta", located between Rome and Naples.

In Church Latin, Gaetan is written Caietanus.

The feminine forms of Gaétan and Gaëtan are Gaétane, Gaétanne and Gaëtane.

Related names include:

- German: Cajetan
- German and Polish: Kajetan
- Italian: Gaetano
- Portuguese: Caetano
- Spanish: Cayetano

People named Gaétan or Gaëtan include:

== Gaétan ==
- Gaétan Boucher (1958), Canadian speed skater
- Gaétan Brulotte (1945), Canadian writer
- Gaétan Malette, Canadian politician
- Gaëtan Picon (1915–1976), French essayist and art critic

== Gaëtan ==
- Gaëtan Bong (born 1988), Cameroonian footballer
- Gaëtan Deneuve (born 1985), French footballer
- Gaétan Duchesne (1962–2007), Canadian ice hockey player
- Gaëtan Englebert (born 1976), Belgian footballer
- Gaëtan Gatian de Clérambault (1852–1934), French psychiatrist, ethnographer and photographer
- Gaëtan Gorce (born 1958), French politician
- Gaëtan Huard (born 1962), French footballer
- Gaëtan de Rochebouët (1813–1899), French politician
- Gaëtan de Rosnay (1912–1992), French painter
- Gaëtan Roussel (born 1972), French singer-songwriter
- Gaétan Soucy (born 1958), Canadian writer and philosopher
- Gaëtan Vassart (born 1978), Belgian and French actor and director
