= Gaetana (given name) =

Gaetana is a given name, the feminine form of Gaetano. It may refer to:

- Gae Aulenti (1927–2012), Italian architect and designer
- Gaetana Goldoni (1768–1830), Venetian actress
- Gaetana Russo (born 1981), Italian politician
- Gaetana Sterni (1827–1889), Italian Catholic professed religious, founder of the Sisters of Divine Will
- Gaetana Tolomeo (1936–1997), beatified Italian laywoman

== See also ==
- Gaitana (fl. 1539–1540), leader of an indigenous rebellion against the Spanish in what is now Colombia
- Gaitana (singer), stage name of Ukrainian singer and songwriter Gaita-Lurdes Klaverivna Essami (born 1979)
