= Morazzoni =

Morazzoni is an Italian surname. Notable people with the surname include:

- Gaetano Morazzoni (1932–2025), Italian politician
- Marta Morazzoni (born 1950), Italian educator and writer

== See also ==
- Morazzone, a comune in the Italian province of Varese
