= Gaëtane =

Gaëtane is a given name, the feminine form of Gaëtan. It may refer to:

- Gaëtane Deberdt (born 1998), French judoka
- Gaëtane de Montreuil, pen name of Géorgina Bélanger (1867–1951), Canadian journalist, writer and poet
- Gaëtane Thiney (born 1985), French footballer
- Gaëtane Verna, Canadian museum curator
