= Sainte-Agathe-des-Monts =

- City
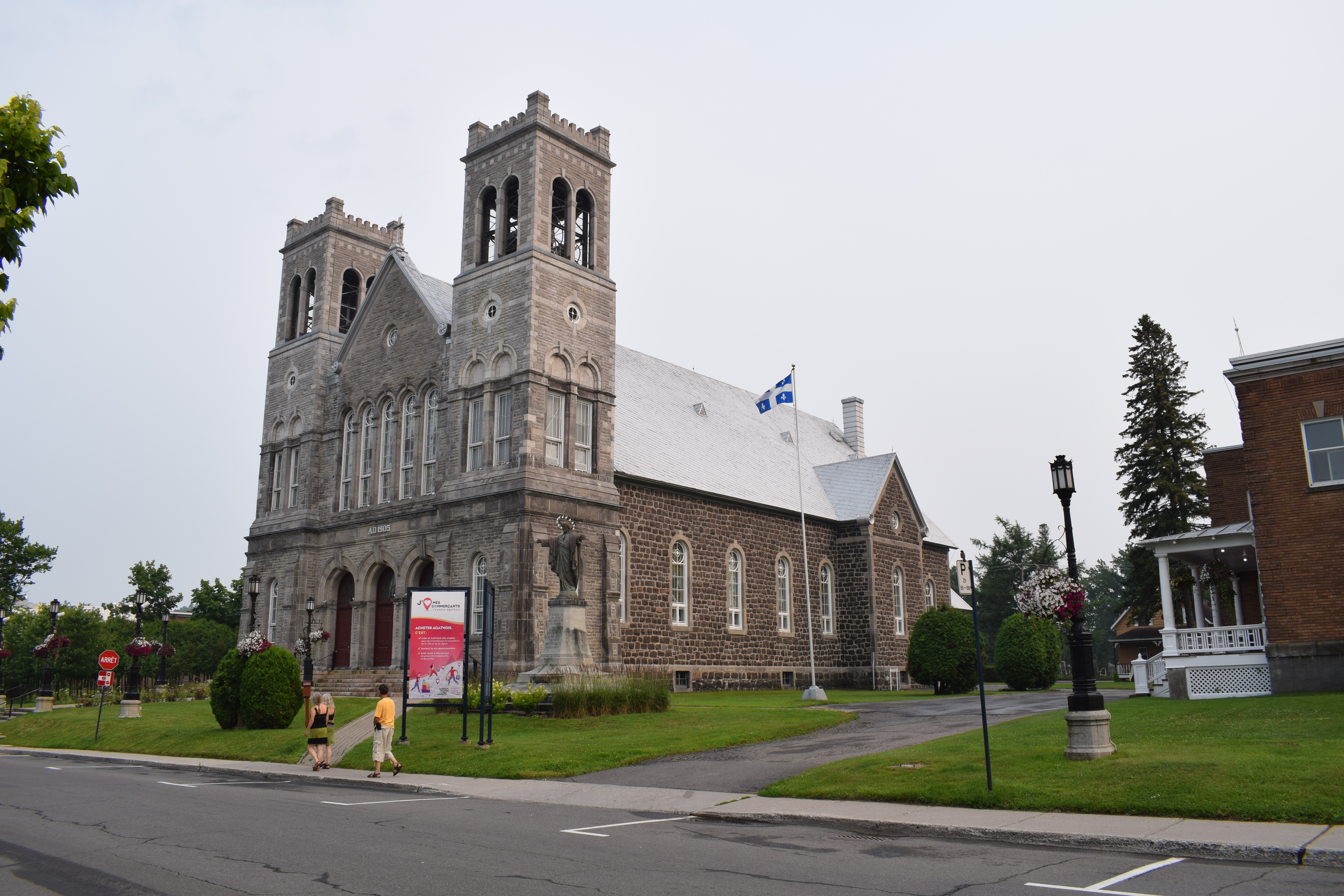
- Church of Sainte-Agathe-des-Monts

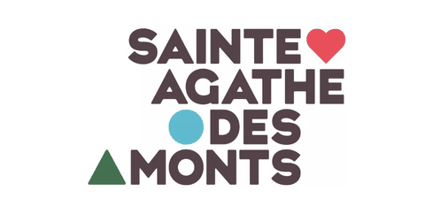
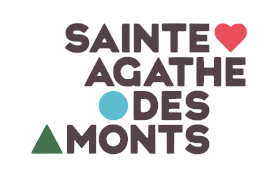
- Flag Seal

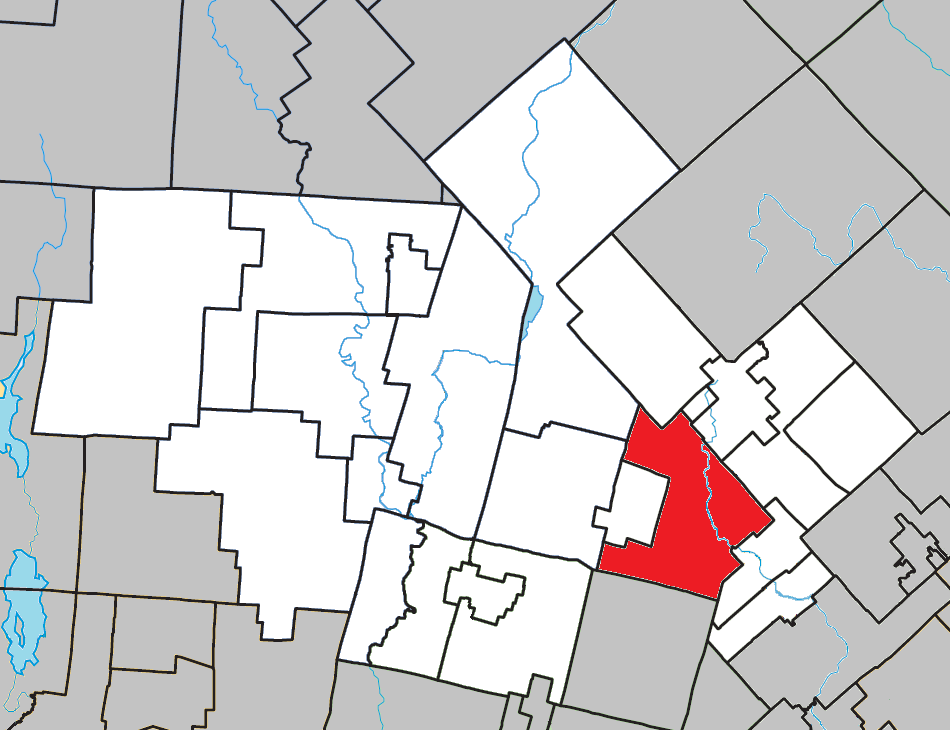
- Location within Les Laurentides RCM

- Location in central Quebec
- Coordinates: 46°03′N 74°17′W
- Country: Canada
- Province: Quebec
- Region: Laurentides
- RCM: Les Laurentides
- Settled: 1849
- Constituted: February 27, 2002

Government
  - Mayor: Frédéric Broué
  - Federal riding: Laurentides—Labelle
  - Prov. riding: Bertrand

Area
  - City: 140.9 km^{2} (54.4 sq mi)
  - Land: 129.10 km^{2} (49.85 sq mi)
  - Urban: 19.51 km^{2} (7.53 sq mi)
  - Metro: 210.96 km^{2} (81.45 sq mi)

Population (2021)
  - City: 11,211
  - Density: 86.8/km^{2} (225/sq mi)
  - Urban: 12,136
  - Urban density: 622.2/km^{2} (1,611/sq mi)
  - Metro: 19,892
  - Metro density: 94.3/km^{2} (244/sq mi)
  - Pop 2016–2021: ▲9.7%
  - Dwellings: 6,767
- Time zone: UTC−5 (EST)
  - Summer (DST): UTC−4 (EDT)
- Postal code(s): J8C
- Area code: 819
- Highways A-15 (TCH): R-117 (TCH); R-329
- Website: ville.sainte-agathe-des-monts.qc.ca

Sainte-Agathe-des-Monts (French pronunciation: [sɛ̃t aɡat de mɔ̃]) is a town in the province of Quebec, Canada, in the regional county municipality of Les Laurentides in the administrative region of Laurentides, also known as the "Laurentians" or the Laurentian Mountains (in English). Sainte-Agathe-des-Monts borders on a lake called Lac des Sables, and is located approximately 80 kilometres (50 mi) northwest of Montreal, and 130 kilometres (81 mi) northeast of Ottawa.

The town has been twinned with Lagny-sur-Marne, France, since 1969 and Saranac Lake, New York, since 2002.

== History ==
=== Settlement ===
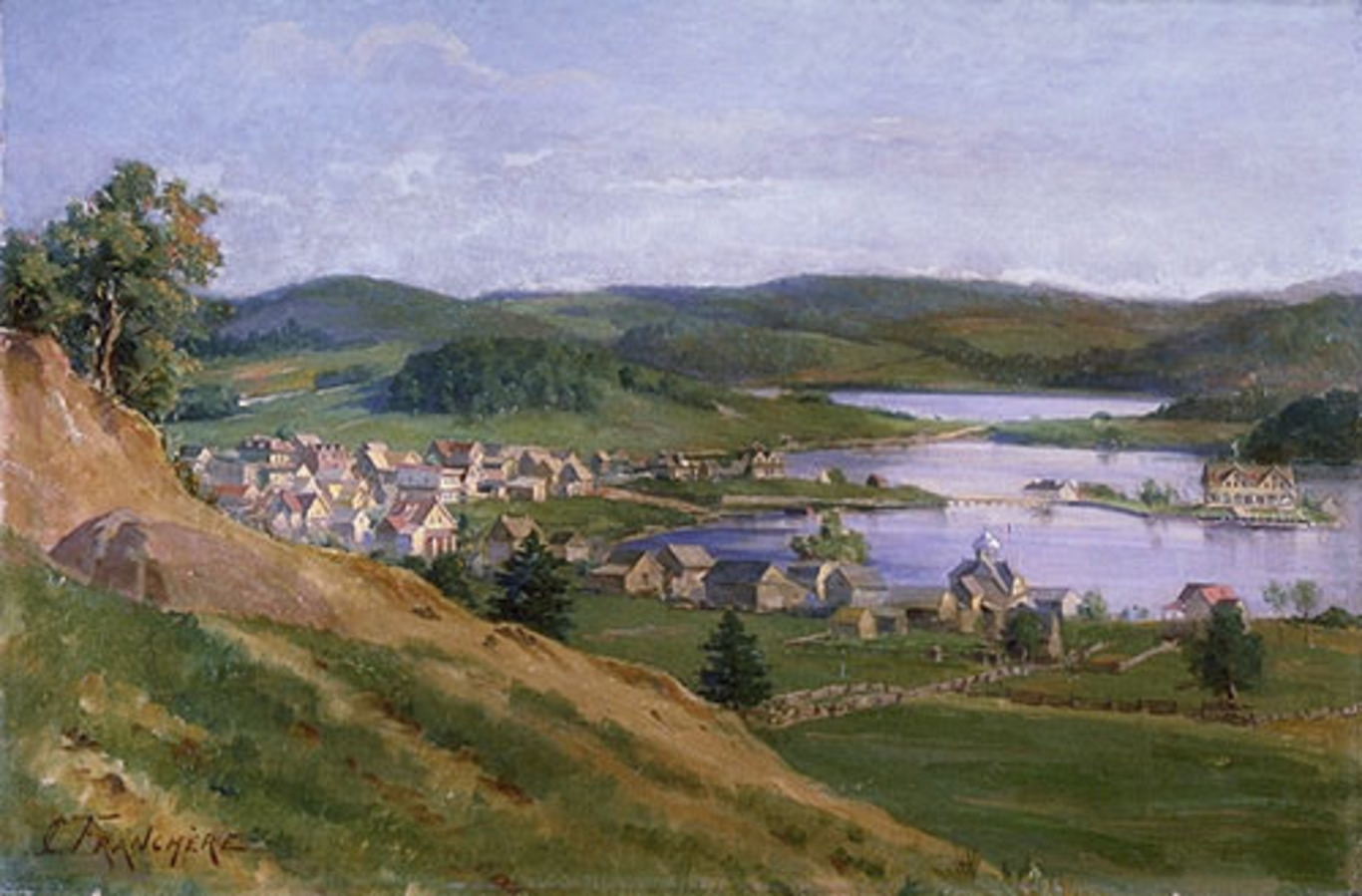
Ste Agathe, around 1900, by Joseph-Charles Franchère

In 1849, the first families arrived on the northern fringe of the area, which was a settlement established by Augustin-Norbert Morin.

Beginning in 1850, a rapid colonization of the region began. The arriving families were primarily of French Catholic background. The village is centred on a Catholic church built in 1904. In 1865, the land on which the church stands was donated to the parish by Dr. Luc-Eusèbe Larocque, brother of the Monsignor. Dr. Larocque had amassed a fortune in the California Gold Rush and had decided to live the life of a seigneur. He bought several farms around Lac à la Truite (Trout Lake) and area but was too kind-hearted to ask for the rents. There is also a smaller Anglican church, "Holy Trinity Anglican Parish", in the town. In 1926 the Lord Bishop of the Anglican Church of Montreal presided over the dedication of the current building. The English Protestant community grew from the time the train first arrived in 1892.

=== Development ===
With the completion of a railway to Sainte-Agathe-des-Monts in 1892, the town experienced a rapid increase in population. Between 1892 and 1911, a number of spas and hospitals were established. In 1899, a tuberculosis hospital was founded by Dr. Arthur Richer. Elizabeth Wand, a nurse from New York City established a spa, which still operates as Auberge Tour du Lac. It was believed at the time that fresh mountain air could help cure tuberculosis and other pulmonary diseases. By 1910, many wealthy families from Montreal and northern United States had built residences along the shoreline of Lac des Sables. Octavien Rolland, third son of J.B. Rolland, founder of Rolland Paper was among the first to arrive. Between 1892 and 1910, the assessed value of the buildings in Sainte-Agathe-des-Monts had increased 20 times. From the 1950s to the 1980s, the town was a popular tourist centre with large resort hotels and many shops and restaurants.

=== Recent times ===
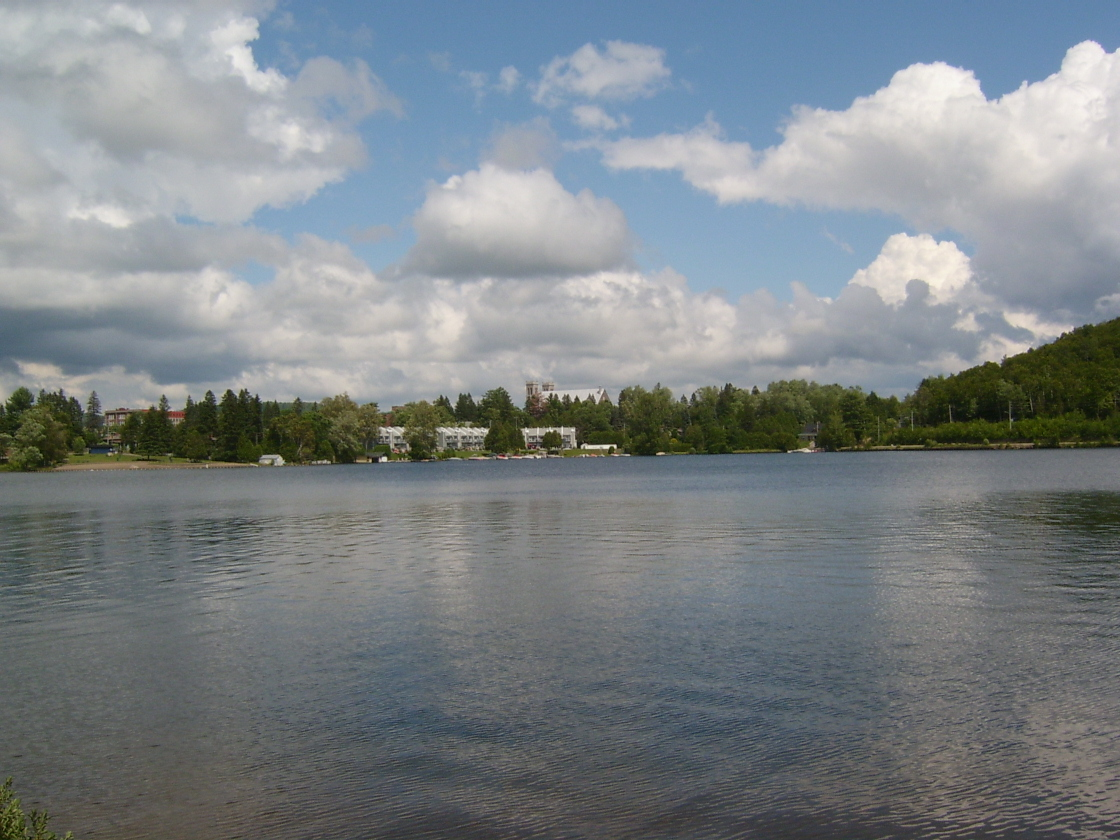
A view from Lac des Sables

In the 1980s, Sainte-Agathe grew as a four-season tourist destination with a broad range of activities for cottagers and residents alike. As a growing service-centre for the surrounding region, its economic base became more diverse with a strong foundation of tourism activities that included, in the summer, horse-back riding, boating, fishing, and lakeside recreation, as well as the winter activities of cross-country skiing, dog-sled racing, skating, and ice hockey. While the train is no longer in service, there is an extensive bike path that has replaced it called "Le Petit Train Du Nord". It directly connects to other paths that extend as far as Montreal.

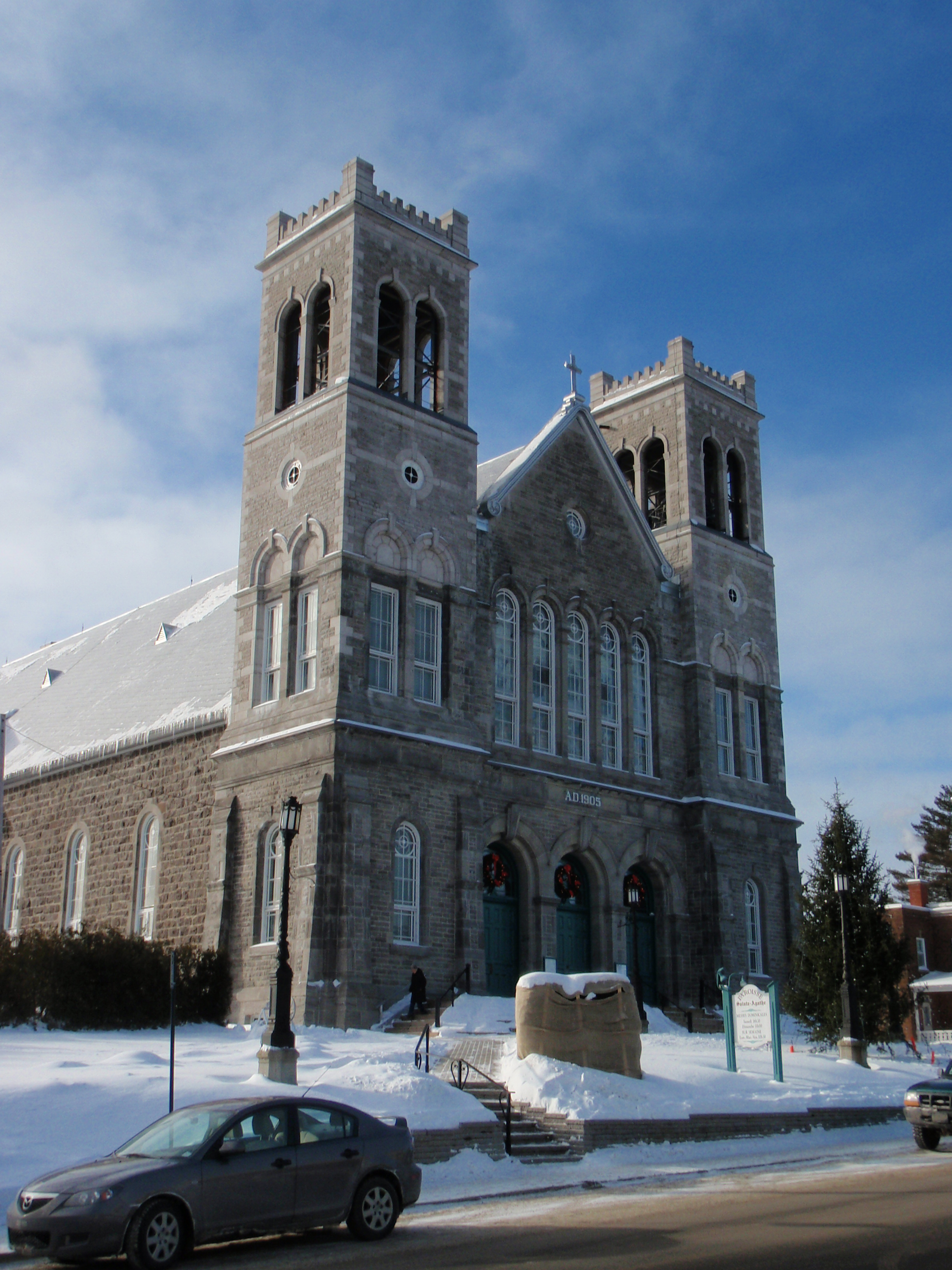
Church of Sainte-Agathe-des-Monts

Today, the town is characterized by its history and tradition of B&Bs, inns, hotels, and spas. As a growing municipality, it has a developing service area that includes a new Walmart, Super 8, and Jean Coutu (among others) strategically placed on the edge of the town so as to not affect its village atmosphere.

On February 27, 2002, Sainte-Agathe-Nord and Ivry-sur-le-Lac merged with Sainte-Agathe-des-Monts to form an expanded city; however Ivry-sur-le-Lac later demerged in 2006.

=== English community ===
Next to Mont Tremblant, Sainte-Agathe-des-Monts has the largest population of English-speaking summer cottage residents in the Laurentians (with a smaller but still sizable winter cottage population as well, particularly on the weekends). Generations of English-speaking cottagers from Montreal, Ontario, New York and New Jersey vacation amidst the lakes and mountains surrounding the town.

== Geography ==
The town is underlain by anorthosite bedrock which is covered by stony sandy loam soil with classic podzol profile development.

Climate data for Sainte-Agathe-des-Monts
Month	Jan	Feb	Mar	Apr	May	Jun	Jul	Aug	Sep	Oct	Nov	Dec	Year
Record high °C (°F)	9.4 (48.9)	12.0 (53.6)	18.9 (66.0)	28.5 (83.3)	30.6 (87.1)	31.7 (89.1)	33.6 (92.5)	35.6 (96.1)	28.9 (84.0)	25.6 (78.1)	17.2 (63.0)	12.9 (55.2)	35.6 (96.1)
Mean daily maximum °C (°F)	−7.8 (18.0)	−5.4 (22.3)	0.5 (32.9)	8.3 (46.9)	17.0 (62.6)	21.1 (70.0)	23.7 (74.7)	22.1 (71.8)	16.6 (61.9)	9.9 (49.8)	2.3 (36.1)	−5.2 (22.6)	8.6 (47.5)
Mean daily minimum °C (°F)	−18.7 (−1.7)	−16.8 (1.8)	−11.0 (12.2)	−2.6 (27.3)	4.3 (39.7)	9.0 (48.2)	11.9 (53.4)	10.7 (51.3)	5.8 (42.4)	0.5 (32.9)	−5.6 (21.9)	−15.2 (4.6)	−2.3 (27.9)
Record low °C (°F)	−37.3 (−35.1)	−36.7 (−34.1)	−32.8 (−27.0)	−19.4 (−2.9)	−9.4 (15.1)	−3.1 (26.4)	1.7 (35.1)	−0.4 (31.3)	−6.2 (20.8)	−10.6 (12.9)	−23.3 (−9.9)	−35.2 (−31.4)	−37.3 (−35.1)
Average precipitation mm (inches)	91.9 (3.62)	80.8 (3.18)	89.2 (3.51)	81.3 (3.20)	89.1 (3.51)	108.7 (4.28)	96.8 (3.81)	111.9 (4.41)	101.7 (4.00)	101.9 (4.01)	108.4 (4.27)	113 (4.4)	1,174.6 (46.24)
Mean monthly sunshine hours	96.9	124	157.3	183.3	223.1	236.3	265	229.6	159.2	124.8	73.2	67	1,940.4
Source: Environment Canada

== Demographics ==
According to the 2021 Census, Sainte-Agathe-des-Monts had a population of 11,211 living in 5,514 of its 6,767 total private dwellings, a change of 9.7% from its 2016 population of 10,223. With a land area of 129.1 km^{2} (49.8 sq mi), it had a population density of 86.8/km^{2} (224.9/sq mi) in 2021.

Population trend:

- Population in 2021: 11,211 (2016 to 2021 population change: 9.7%)
- Population in 2016: 10,223
- Population in 2011: 10,115
- Population in 2006: 9,679
- Population in 2001: 7,116
- Population in 1996: 5,669
- Population in 1991: 5,452
- Population in 1986: 5,254
- Population in 1981: 5,641
- Population in 1976: 5,435
- Population in 1971: 5,532
- Population in 1966: 6,010
- Population in 1961: 5,725
- Population in 1956: 5,173
- Population in 1951: 5,169
- Population in 1941: 3,308
- Population in 1931: 2,949
- Population in 1921: 2,812
- Population in 1911: 2,020
- Population in 1901: 1,073

Mother tongue (permanent residents, excluding seasonal cottagers):

- French as first language: 91.4%
- English as first language: 4.7%
- Other as first language: 2.3%

== Infrastructure ==
- The Commission Scolaire des Laurentides school board is headquartered in the town.
- The Centre Hospitalier Laurentien is the local hospital.

== Education ==
Commission scolaire des Laurentides is headquartered in this town.

- Francophone primary schools: Notre-Dame-de-la-Sagesse, Fleur-des-Neiges, Lionel-Groulx, Monseigneur-Bazinet
- Secondary school: École polyvalente des Monts

The Sir Wilfrid Laurier School Board operates Sainte Agathe Academy, a primary and secondary Anglophone school, in the community.

== Notable people ==
- Jean-Jacques Bertrand (1916–1973), former Quebec premier, was a native of Sainte-Agathe-des-Monts.
- Jonathan Drouin, NHL player for the Colorado Avalanche, was born in Sainte-Agathe-des-Monts.
- Pierre-Luc Dubois, NHL player for the Washington Capitals, was born in Sainte-Agathe-des-Monts.
- Mikaël Kingsbury, Olympic gold medal freestyle skier
- Gaston Miron, poet, was born and raised in Sainte-Agathe-des-Monts
- Mordecai Richler, author, set his novel, The Apprenticeship of Duddy Kravitz, in Sainte-Agathe-des-Monts.
- Ronnie Stern (born 1967), ice hockey player
- Youri Chassin, MNA for Saint-Jerome since 2018.
