= List of AC Milan chairmen =

The following is a list of chairmen of AC Milan.

== History ==
In more than 120 years of history, 23 presidents have taken turns at the helm of Milan. The first president of the club was Alfred Edwards, who was also one of the club's founding members.

The longest-serving president in the history of Milan is Silvio Berlusconi, who took office in 1986 and held the position until 2004, when he resigned following the approval of a law governing conflicts of interest. He was then president for another two years, from 2006 to 2008, when he left office for the same reason, after becoming Italian Prime Minister, and honorary president from 2012 to 2017, when, after 31 years of management, he sold the club. The most victorious presidency in the history of the club is linked to the management of Berlusconi, with 26 trophies won, which rise to 29 when considering the period in which the office was vacant, for the reasons mentioned above, but during which Berlusconi maintained the ownership of the club.

Other notable presidents in the history of Milan include: Piero Pirelli, in office for 19 years, from 1909 to 1928, famous for having built the San Siro stadium; Andrea Rizzoli, under whose leadership Milan won 4 league titles and its first European Cup, and who had the Milanello sports center built; Franco Carraro, also winner of a European Cup and the Rossoneri's first Intercontinental Cup.

== List of chairmen ==
Name	Years
Alfred Edwards	1899–1909
Piero Pirelli	1909–1928
Luigi Ravasco	1928-1929
Mario Benazzoli	1929-1933
vacant office	1933
Luigi Ravasco	1933-1935
Pietro Annoni	1935-1936
vacant office	1936
Emilio Colombo	1936-1939
Achille Invernizzi	1939-1940
vacant office	1940-1944
vacant office	1944-1945
Umberto Trabattoni	1945-1954
Andrea Rizzoli	1954-1963
Felice Riva	1963-1965
vacant office	1965-1966
Luigi Carraro	1966-1967

Name	Years
Franco Carraro	1967-1971
Federico Sordillo	1971-1972
Albino Buticchi	1972-1975
Bruno Pardi	1975-1976
Vittorio Duina	1976-1977
Felice Colombo	1977-1980
Gaetano Morazzoni	1980-1982
Giuseppe Farina	1982-1986
Rosario Lo Verde	1986
Silvio Berlusconi	1986-2004
vacant office	2004-2006
Silvio Berlusconi	2006-2008
vacant office	2008-2017
Li Yonghong	2017-2018
Paolo Scaroni	2018-present
