= Henri Beau =

French-Canadian Impressionist painter

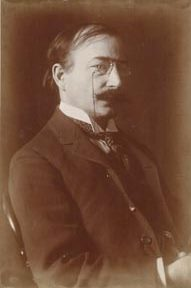
- Henri Beau
- Born: Louis-Henri Beau; 27 June 1863; Montreal, Canada East
- Died: 15 May 1949 (aged 85); Paris, France
- Education: Joseph Chabert, Léon Bonnat, William-Adolphe Bouguereau, Jean-Léon Gérôme and Pierre Puvis de Chavannes
- Known for: Painter
- Notable work: Chemin en été; Les noces de Cana; L'arrivée de Champlain à Québec and La dispersion des Acadiens
- Movement: Impressionism
- Spouse: Marie Fertinel
- Patrons: Alfred-Léon Senneterre

Henri Beau (French pronunciation: [ɑ̃ʁi bo]; né Louis-Henri Beau; 27 June 1863 – 15 May 1949) was a French-Canadian Impressionist painter. He is noted for Chemin en été, La dispersion des Acadiens, L'arrivée de Champlain à Québec, and Les Noces de Cana. Beau is a largely forgotten artist due to his long absence from Canada. His widow Marie Beau worked towards establishing his reputation as an artist in Canada after his death. He was only recognized as a notable artist decades later, with major retrospectives of his paintings celebrating his career by the Galerie Bernard Desroches in Montréal in 1974, and at the Musée du Québec (now Musée national des beaux-arts du Québec) in Québec City in 1987.

Beau studied under French Masters Joseph Chabert, Léon Bonnat, William-Adolphe Bouguereau, Jean-Léon Gérôme, and Pierre Puvis de Chavannes. He had initial success as an Impressionist painter, amongst other Canadian Impressionists in Paris, and was awarded the Ordre des Palmes Académiques by the French government. He obtained art commissions from the Notre-Dame Basilica in Montréal and the Government of Quebec. He served as associate archivist for the Parisian-branch of the Public Archives of Canada (now Library and Archives Canada) from 1921 to 1938.

== Biography ==
=== Birth and childhood ===
Henri Beau was born Louis-Henri Beau to a working class French-Canadian family in Montréal, in 1863. He was the third child of restaurateur Charles-Arsène Beau and Marguerite-Clémentine Hupé. He had seven brothers and three sisters. He was baptized at Notre-Dame Basilica in Montréal on 28 June 1863, a day after his birth. He was raised in a boarding house located at 129 Craig Street according to Lovell's Directory of the Citizens of 1863–1864.

His father, Charles-Arsène Beau, was born in Belleville, east of Paris, France, in 1823, arrived in New York City in 1848, and settled in Montréal in 1858, where he lived until his death in 1894. He was a cook and a restaurant manager at restaurant Beau frequented regularly by painter Edmond Dyonnet according to his mémoires. His father met and married his mother, Marguerite-Clémentine Hupé, a 21-year-old Montréal woman sometime before 1851. They moved to Montréal in 1858. That union produced eleven children, including Arthur, Louis-Henri, Joseph-Vincent, Charles and Paul; but few records exist of the names of the other children. The surname "Beau" might be attributed as Le Beau. His brother Paul Beau (1871–1949) was a fine arts ironworker. Later Beau produced a décanteur à trépied (decanter tripod) as an homage to his brother.

=== Art education ===
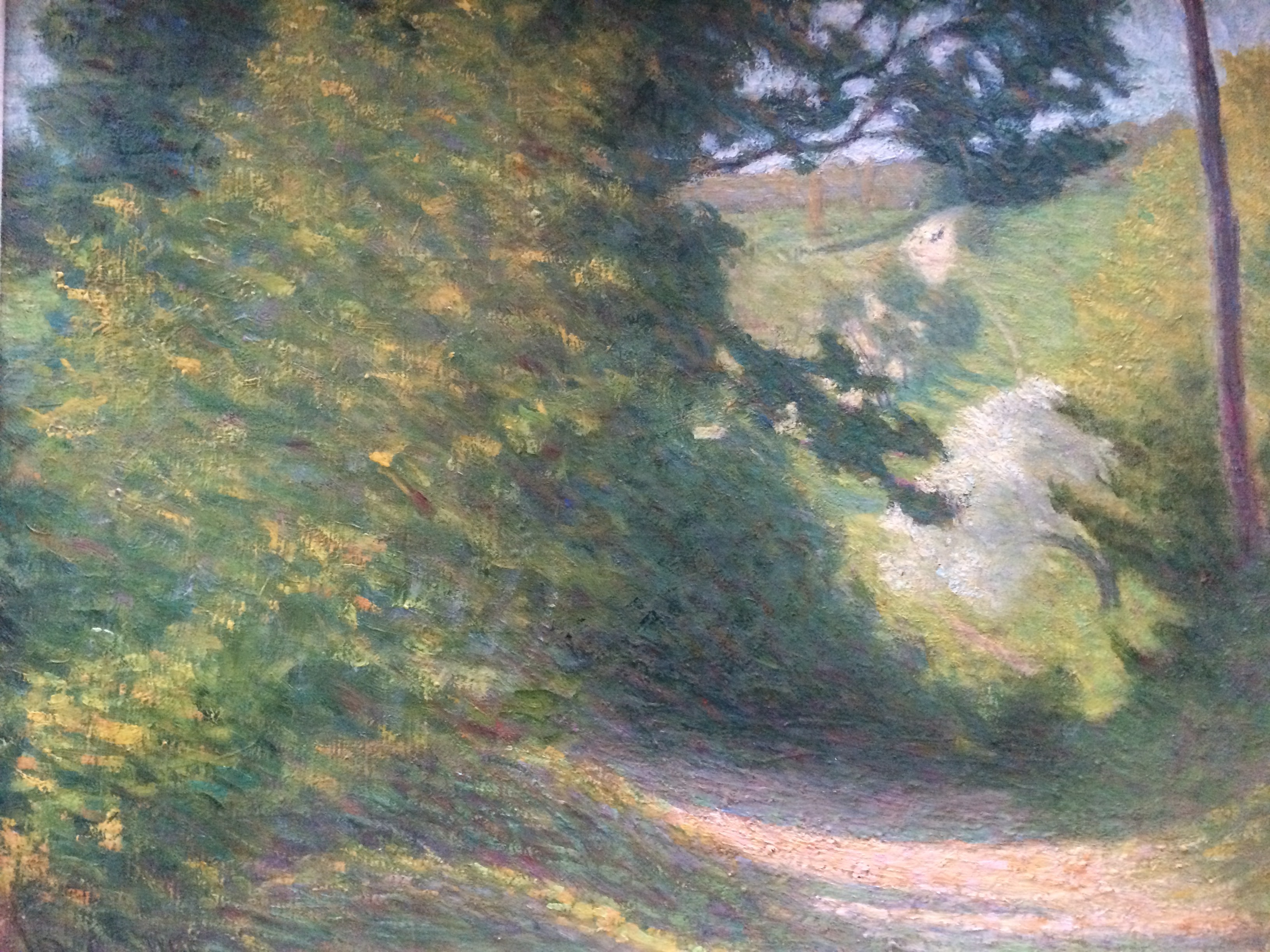
Chemin en Été (Path in Summer), Beau 1895. Early Impressionist landscape painted while he was a student in Paris.

In 1881, he studied under Abbé Joseph Chabert who taught academic art at the Institut National des Beaux-Arts, Sciences, Arts et Métiers et Industrie (1871–1887), an establishment founded by Chabert and benefactors such as industrialist Jean-Baptiste Prat. Marie Chantal Leblanc, then a graduate student under art historian and professor Laurier Lacroix at the Université du Québec à Montréal (UQAM), notes in her mémoire that under Chabert, Beau most likely encountered and interacted with Joseph-Charles Franchère, Ludger Larose and Charles Gill at some point, as all are listed as students in the Nordheimer classroom between 1885 and 1888. In 1884, he travelled to the United States, where he coloured woodcuts in San Francisco. He then travelled to Paris to continue his education at studios there. He began presenting his work at exhibitions in Paris in the 1890s.

Beau's presence in Paris is mentioned in the 21 June 1888 edition of the journal Paris-Canada, founded in the year 1884 to promote Franco-Canadian relations. He studied under William-Adolphe Bouguereau at l'Académie Julian and Jean-Léon Gérôme at École des Beaux-Arts in Paris known today as l'École nationale supérieure des Beaux-Arts. Gérôme encouraged his pupils to be independent and used his influence to help them gain admittance to the Salon in Paris. Unlike many of his Canadian peers who pursued an art education in Paris, Beau's family was not wealthy so he used his talents as a painter to earn a living. He is known to have copied eleven paintings from the Louvre in 1896 and 1900. According to a letter by Beau's wife (held in the archives of the MBNAQ) to Paul Rainville, then curator of the Musée de la Province de Québec (MBNAQ), Beau also attended l'Académie Colarossi. It is also mentioned that he studied with Léon Bonnat and Pierre Puvis de Chavannes who advised Beau to pursue landscape painting.

== Art career ==
=== Early career ===
In 1893, Beau received a commission from Alfred-Léon Senneterre to paint Les Noces de Cana, depicting the marriage at Cana, delivered to the Notre-Dame du Sacré-Coeur Chapel in the Notre-Dame Basilica of Montreal in 1894. He received $500.00 (around $13,590) in 2016 dollars) according to a document held in the parish archives. The painting was destroyed on 7 December 1978, when a fire ravaged the chapel.

As Beau's family background was that of a working-class family living in a boarding house, patronage from Senneterre allowed him to pursue an art education in Paris. Especially after his father's death in 1894, finishing his studies in Paris would only have been possible with the help of patrons. According to an article in Canadian Art by Evan H. Turner, few Montrealers were interested in Impressionist paintings. One notable early and first collector of French Impressionist art was Sir William Cornelius Van Horne. It is documented that Van Horne sat on the Art Association of Montreal Gallery Committee and involved himself personally in the Canadian Pacific Railway's art acquisition program. He was a known patron of Parisian-trained Impressionist painters, and his painting collection contained works by nearly all of the early Impressionist painters of his time.

In 1902, Beau received a commission from the Government of Québec for L'arrivée de Champlain à Québec for the Legislative Council of Quebec, delivered in 1903, for which he was paid $1,300 (around $27,500) in 2016 dollars). It was criticized for historical inaccuracies. In 1909, he proposed producing a larger painting depicting the first session of the Legislative Assembly of Quebec in 1792. This was deferred for administrative reasons and the project was assigned subsequently to Charles Huot in 1910. In July 1904, Beau returned to Montréal and worked as an art professor at l'école Sarsfield from September 1905 to April 1906. In 1906, he produced a painting for the Royal Alexandra Hotel (demolished in 1971) in Winnipeg. His brother, Paul Beau had previously collaborated with the hotel's architects, Edouard et William Sutherland Maxwell.

=== Career at the Public Archives of Canada (1915–1938) ===
Beau's career in the civil service started in 1915 when he was a temporary copyist for the Paris branch of the Public Archives of Canada (now Library and Archives Canada). He was promoted to associate archivist in 1921, a position he held until his retirement in 1938. During the entire time from 1915 to 1938 he was the Archives' official painter; his duties were to document and illustrate traditional civil, military, and religious customs related to Canadian history, painting the Port of France, and depicting historical figures involved the founding of New France. He was based mostly in France, though he did work for a number of Canadian customers.

Art historians and critics often consider that he cut his career short working for the Archives, as the commissions involved religious, historical and political themes, restricting and repressing the inner creativity of an artist like Beau. Multiple reasons can perhaps explain this decision such as the appointment of Arthur George Doughty as the Dominion Archivist, and Keeper of the Records, whom Beau admired for his encouragement and his laissez-faire attitude.

=== Later career ===
In 1900, he received the bronze medal at the World Fair in Paris for his painting La Dispertion des Acadiens, depicting the expulsion of the Acadians.

Among his notable works is L'arrivée de Champlain à Québec (1903), which was hung in the council chamber of the National Assembly of Quebec in 1908. It has since been removed to Musée des Beaux-arts de Québec. He also painted Les noces de Cana, which is in Notre-Dame Basilica.

=== Memberships ===
Beau was a member of various art societies in France, including the Société des Uns and the Parisian Société de Salon d'Hiver.

== Personal life ==
Beau married a woman before August 1906. Little is known about her aside from an entry in Ludger Larose's diary that states that Beau's wife is searching for him. He left her around that time for Marie Fertinel an opera singer with whom he had an affair and later married in 1946. Beau died on 15 May 1949 in Paris. He is buried at the cimetière de Rueil-Malmaison (Hauts-de-Seine).

== Art styles and techniques ==
Beau would sign his paintings as "HBeau", usually with the year, and sometimes with the location, they were painted. Beau's wife, Marie, is portrayed in many of his paintings. He also drew inspiration for his paintings from his travels around Europe. Beau's earliest known work of art is from 1891. Very little is known of his time studying academic arts under Abbé Joseph Chabert. As Chabert was educated at the École Impériale des Beaux-Arts in Paris, known to be neutral to politics, and described by Napoléon Bourassa as an uncontrollable spirit, this was reflected in his teachings. As Beau was studying in Paris at a time Impressionism was establishing itself as an art movement, many of his paintings between 1891 and 1899 reflect the era's style.

The evolution of Henri Beau as an artist can be seen in a photobiographic form, by looking at his works in chronological order. Beau drew inspiration from Camille Corot, Claude Monet and Camille Pissarro, which is reflected in his earlier paintings named Landscapes.

During his time at the Public Archives of Canada, Beau's works were more structured. During his personal time, he painted Impressionist landscapes. His paintings in his final years, from 1939 to 1949, were of the Jaujac region in Ardèche in southern France.

== Legacy ==
After his death, his widow Marie Beau and a few of his friends wished to honour his memory by establishing his reputation as an artist. They tried to interest the National Gallery of Canada and the Musée du Quebec in acquiring more of his works. In 1956, Beau's wife donated ten of his paintings to the Musée du Québec. In 1974, the Galerie Bernard Desroches acquired artwork and documentation from Madame Beau's estate.

The vast majority of Beau's known works reside at Library and Archives Canada. Beau was known to paint Impressionist landscapes for his personal collection.

Known repositories of material about Beau in relation to Canadian and Quebecois art history are:

- Fonds Henri Beau, Musée national des beaux-arts du Québec
- Fonds Henri Beau, Galeries Bernard Desroches

== Exhibitions ==
Throughout his career, Beau exhibited his works in Montreal and Paris. He exhibited at the Salon des Indépendants in Paris and the Galerie Figaro according to documents held by the Galerie Bernard Desroches.

=== Exhibitions ===
- Salon des Champs-Elysées in Paris: 1893–94.
- Salon du Champs-de-Mars in Paris: 1893.
- Salon des Indépendants in Paris: 1897, 1903.
- L'Exposition Universelle in Paris: 1900.
- Pan-American Exposition in Buffalo: 1901.
- Universal Exposition in St-Louis: 1904.
- Montreal Art Association Salon: 1905.

=== Posthumous exhibitions ===
- In 1950, the Salon des Indépendants à Paris exhibited six of his artworks posthumously.
- In 1974, The Galerie Bernard Desroches in Montreal presented an exhibition entitled l'Éxposition rétrospective Henri Beau, 1863–1949; the provenance of most of the artwork is that it belonged to the estate of the late Madame Beau.
- In 1987, The Musée national des beaux-arts du Québec, at the time known as the Musée du Québec, organized an exhibition on Beau and published a catalogue raisonné for the occasion titled Henri Beau, 1863–1949 by Pierre L'Allier, then curator of modern arts at the museum.
- In 2001, The Musée Marc-Aurèle Fortin, which closed and donated its archives and collection to the Montreal Museum of Fine Arts in 2007, held an exhibition entitled Paysages du Québec 1900–1948 in which Beau's Chemin en été painted in 1895 appeared, according to the exhibition's catalogue of the same name. Its provenance is attributed to the Galerie d'Art Michel Bigué.

=== Permanent displays ===
- Femme à l'ombrelle painted in 1897, which appears in the catalogue raisonné of Pierre L'Allier and A.K. Prakash is exhibited at the Musée des Beaux-Arts de Montréal. It was acquired in 1986 and it is exhibited in their Québecois and Canadian arts collection.

== List of known artworks ==
The following is an incomplete list of Beau's artworks. Those listed here are known to have appeared in a catalogue raisonné or other sources.

- Portrait of a Woman, 1891
- Les noces de Cana, 1894
- Chemin en été, 1895
- Summer in the Garden, 1895
- Winter, 1895
- En Provence, 1897
- Femme à l'ombrelle, 1897
- La Dispertion des Acadiens, 1900
- Montreal under Snow, 1903
- L'arrivée de Champlain à Québec, 1903
- In the Shadow of a Tree, 1904
- The Picnic, c. 1904–1905
- The Bathers, c. 1907
- Marie Fertinel, 1914
- Atelier de l'artiste, c.1924–1925
- Lady in the Forest, c. 1915
- Woman Reading, c. 1920
- View of Honfleur, 1925

== Record sale prices ==
At the Cowley-Abbott Auction titled An Important Private Collection - Part II, June 8th 2023, lot #145, Summer in the Garden (1895), oil on canvas, 15 x 18 ins ( 38.1 x 45.7 cms ), Auction Estimate: $5,000.00 - $7,000.00, realized a price of $60,000.00.

== See also ==
- Canadian Impressionism
