= Cayetano =

Cayetano is a Spanish and sometimes Sephardic Jewish name related to the Italian name Gaetano, both from the Latin Caietanus, meaning "from Gaeta". It is a common given name in Spain, Mexico, Argentina and the Philippines. As a surname, it is also found predominantly in those countries, as well as Peru. The feminine version of the name is Cayetana.

== People ==
=== Given name ===
- Saint Cajetan, Italian Catholic priest and religious reformer
- Cayetano (Giorgos Bratanis), Greek musician
- Cayetano Apablasa (1847–1889), American land owner and politician
- Cayetano Arellano (1847–1920), Chief Justice of the Supreme Court of the Philippines
- Cayetano Biondo (1902–1986), Argentine film actor
- Cayetano Carpio (1918–1983), leader of the Communist Party of El Salvador
- Cayetano Coll y Cuchí (1881–1961), Puerto Rican politician
- Cayetano Coll y Toste (1850–1930), Puerto Rican historian and writer
- Cayetano Cornet (born 1963), Spanish athlete
- Cayetano Corona Gaspariano (fl. 1981), Mexican potter
- Cayetano Descalzi (1809–1886), Argentine painter of Italian origin
- Cayetano Garza (born 1972), American comic artist
- Cayetano Santos Godino (1896–1944), Argentinian serial killer
- Cayetano Domingo Grossi (1854–1900), Argentine serial killer of Italian origin
- Cayetano Heredia (1797–1861), Peruvian physician
- Cayetano Hilario Abellán (1916–1997), Spanish sculptor
- Cayetano María Huarte Ruiz de Briviesca (1741–1806), Spanish writer and poet
- Cayetano Antonio Licciardo (1923–1999), Argentine politician
- Antonio Cayetano March (born 2000), Ecuadorian tennis player
- Cayetano Ordóñez (1904–1961), Spanish bullfighter
- Cayetano Pacana (fl. 1900), Filipino soldier and Mayor of Cagayan de Misamis
- Cayetano Paderanga Jr. (1948–2016), Filipino economist
- Cayetano Pignatelli, 3rd Marquis of Rubí (born 1730), Spanish nobleman and military figure
- Cayetano Ré (1938–2013), Paraguayan footballer
- Cayetano Redondo Aceña (1885–1940), Spanish politician, journalist, Mayor of Madrid
- Cayetano Ripoll (1778–1826), Spanish schoolmaster executed for heresy
- Cayetano Rivera Ordóñez (born 1977), Spanish bullfighter
- Cayetano José Rodríguez (1761–1823), Argentine cleric, journalist and poet
- Cayetano Santos Godino (1896–1944), Argentine serial killer
- Cayetano Saporiti (1887–1954), Uruguayan footballer
- Cayetano Sarmiento (born 1987), Colombian road bicycle racer
- Cayetano Alberto Silva (1868–1920), Uruguayan musician and composer
- Cayetano Valdés y Flores (1767–1835), commander of the Spanish Navy

=== Surname ===
- Alan Peter Cayetano (born 1970), Filipino politician, former House Speaker and Senate President; current Senate Minority Leader
- Ben Cayetano (born 1939), American politician and author; 5th governor of Hawaii
- Eryn Cayetano (born 2001), American tennis player
- Fille Cayetano (née Cainglet; born 1990), Filipino former professional volleyball player; wife of Lino
- Laarni "Lani" Cayetano (née Lopez; born 1981), Filipino politician and current mayor of Taguig; wife of Alan Peter
- Lino Cayetano (born 1978), Filipino politician and current general manager of People's Television Network; brother of Alan Peter and Pia
- Pilar Juliana "Pia" Cayetano (born 1966), Filipino politician, lawyer, economist and television host; sister of Alan Peter and Lino
- Renato "Rene" Cayetano (1934–2003), Filipino politician, lawyer, television presenter, and journalist; father of Alan Peter, Lino, and Pia

== See also ==
- Cayetano Germosén, town in the Dominican Republic
- Cayetano Heredia University, Peruvian University
