= Cayetano María Huarte Ruiz de Briviesca =

Spanish writer (1741–1806)

Cayetano María Huarte Ruiz de Briviesca was a Spanish writer and poet. He was born in Cádiz in 1741 and died in 1806.

== Biography ==
Cayetano, son of perpetual alderman Juan Antonio de Huarte and brother of Francisco de Huarte, one of the contributors to the foundation of the Academy of Fine Arts of Cádiz, was born in 1741. After receiving a doctorate in Theology from the University of Osuna, he joined a cathedral chapter in 1773. He was subsequently named director of the College of Santa Cruz, which was founded to serve as the talent pool for the cathedral choir.

He visited the town of Vejer de la Frontera after evidence appeared suggesting that Saint Cervantes and Saint Germain passed through the town on their way to Tangier to receive martyrs' palms. He was a governing board member at the Cádiz Hospice, where he became the spiritual director. He insisted that the dowries granted by the patronages of pious works administered by the chapter benefited the poor. In 1786, he called for his fellow chapter clerics to assist in buying quinine to treat yellow fever. His efforts ensured that the prebendaries increased the finances allocated to the hospice.

Named canon penitentiary in 1788, his precarious health required him to spend many years residing in the town of Lanjaron in the Province of Granada so that he could benefit from the local spring water. By 1797, his activities had returned to their previous rhythm, with the chapter entrusting him with important missions. He went to Seville to present the accounts of the patronages of pious works to the Audiencia Provincial and led the protests of the prebendaries during the Spanish confiscation in 1798. He then organised a series of pastoral visits for the dioceses, the reports of which are first-hand sources, giving us an insight into spiritual life at the end of the 18th century. It appears that he died suddenly, leaving no will, in 1806.

According to Ravina Marín, Huarte belonged to a group of erudite figures from Cádiz, which included his brother Francisco, Antonio Mosti, Rafael de Antúnez, Gaspar de Molina y Zaldívar, the marquis of Ureña and the marquis of Méritos. Cayetano must have been on good terms with them since he presided over the marriage of Antúnez and delivered the sermon during the ceremony in which one of Mosti's daughters became a nun. He was not the only ecclesiastic from Cádiz to share in these ideals; notable among them were ecclesiastical colleague Antonio Trianes and magisterial colleague Antonio Cabrera, though both would concentrate on their endeavours during the first part of the 19th century.

== List of works ==
The majority of Huarte's works remain unpublished to this day, and they consist of three main bodies:

1. Sermons, almost all published in the 18th century.
2. Historical criticism, represented by the Discurso sobre los santos del Obispado de Cádiz [Discourse on the Saints of the Diocese of Cadiz], was read before chapter members in 1802. It attempted to demonstrate that the devotion given to various saints considered part of the diocese was not appropriate from a historical standpoint.
3. Finally, his poetic vein remains captured in Poesías inéditas del Sr. Dn. Cayetano María de Huarte canónigo penitenciario de esta Santa Iglesia Catedral de Cádiz [Unpublished Poems of Señor Don Cayetano María de Huarte Canon Penitentiary of the Holy Cathedral of Cádiz]. A manuscript with calligraphy from the start of the 19th century is preserved in the Biblioteca Municipal de Cádiz, Cadiz Public Library, two typed copies can be found within the Biblioteca de Temas Gaditanos [Library of Topics from Cadiz]. None of his poems, apart from La Ducíada, printed by the Marquis of Méritos in 1807, saw the light of day until their publication in 1991 in the book Iglesia e Ilustración en el Cádiz del siglo XVIII: Cayetano Huarte [Church and Illustration in Cádiz in the 18th century: Cayetano Huarte]. The following is a list of the compositions included in this manuscript:
- La Ducíada.
- Égloga en elogio de Andalucía (1772) [Eclogue in Praise of Andalucia].
- Versión del cántico de Moisés (1797?) [Version of Moses' Canticle].
- Silvano a su hijo que iba voluntario de campaña (1795) [Silvano to her Son who Voluntarily went to the Campaign].
- Soneto con motivo de la guerra contra Francia (1793-17955?) [Sonnet on the Occasion of War against France].
- Soneto con motivo del decreto que prohíbe la “Liga de la Teología Moderna con la Filosofía" y "El pájaro en la Liga" (1799?) [Sonnet on the Occasion of the Decree Banning the “League of Modern Technology with Philosophy”] and [The Bird in the League].
- Soneto con motivo de los escándalos cometidos en la iglesia del Pòpulo en Cuaresma (1793). [Sonnet on the Occasion of the Scandals Committed in the Church of Pòpulo during Lent].
- Soneto a María Amparo Aguirre. [Sonnet to María Amparo Aguirre].
- Anacreóntica a Antero Benito Núñez (1794). [Anacreontic to Antero Benito Núñez].
- A Antero Benito Núñez por la muerte de un amigo común. [To Antero Benito Núñez after the death of a mutual friend].
- Llanto de Delio por su patria Cádiz. [Delio's cry for his homeland, Cádiz].
- A Gelmira al haberse quemado los dedos (1793). [To Gelmira after having burned his fingers].
- Sueño de Delio a Albana. [Delio's dream for Albana] In this poem, Huarte refers to the adoption of the Duchess of Alba, an African girl, a theme also reflected in Manuel José Quintana's poem.
- Fábula primera. La retama y el romero (1797). [First fable. The Retama and the Rosemary].
- Fábula segunda. Las abejas (1798) [Second fable. The Bees].
- Fábula tercera. El vaquero [Third fable. The Cowboy].
- Sátira primera. El familiar del obispo. [First Satire. The Bishop's Relative].
- Sátira segunda. Contra las diversiones de corridas de toros. [Second Satire. Against the Spectacle of Bullfighting].
- Sátira tercera. Contra los errores en las doctrinas morales y devociones falsas y supersticiosas. [Third Satire. Against Errors in Moral Doctrines and False Devotions and Superstitions].
- Sátira cuarta. A la obra del ex jesuita Bonola "Liga de la Teología Moderna con la Filosofía" (1798?). [Fourth Satire. To the work of ex-jesuit Bonola “Union of Modern Theology with Philosophy”].
- Sátira quinta. Himno a la Giralda. [Fifth Satire. Hymn to the Giralda].
- Fábula dicha por una niña del Hospicio (1800). [Fable told by a Girl from the Hospice].
- Lastly, the hilarious satirical letters on the tragedy of Sancho Ortiz de la Roelas (1800), which were written as a response to said work and also as an interpretation of La estrella de Sevilla [The Star of Seville] by Lope de Vega performed by Candido Maria Trigueros, one of the principal adapters of 18th-century theatre during the Spanish Golden Age.

It is possible that Huarte was influenced by the Literary School of Salamanca, as in some poems he uses the alias “Delio,” which was used and initially created by Fray Diego González. In addition, he writes using anacreontic verses, a style which was Meléndez Valdés' favoured, and the use of themes distinctive to Quintana poetry, such as those seen in Sueño de Delio a Albana [Delio's Dream for Albana]. It would also be interesting to establish the possible (or certain) connections between Huarte and the members of the Sevillian Literary School, such as Arjona, Manuel María del Mármol, Reinoso, Blanco White or Lista, but there is no documentation to prove it. Huarte's clerical status was not exceptional in late 18th-century Spanish poetry: Fray Diego González, from the Literary School of Salamanca, and many of the leading representatives from the School of Seville were also ecclesiastical.

A recurring theme in Huarte's poetry is his love for his small hometown of Cadiz, as can be seen in the verses of his work Llanto de Delio por su patria Cádiz [Delio's lament for his homeland Cadiz], written after the British Royal Navy attacked the city in 1797. One can also readily appreciate Huarte's various philanthropic concerns, such as those in Sueño de Delio y Albana [Delio's Dream for Albana], where the anti-slavery sentiments that began to penetrate Spain towards the end of the 18th century are echoed, condemning the atrocities practiced by various European nations towards the African people; and Fábula dicha por una niña del Hospicio [Fable told by a Girl from the Orphanage], in which he urges the orphanage's board of directors to continue with their care efforts. Social and moral criticism is also expressed in his second satirical work: Contra las diversiones en las corridas de toros [Against the Spectacle of Bullfighting].

It is interesting to note the position of the canon concerning the war against the French National Convention (1793–1795), as in contrast to the rest of the country, which enthusiastically welcomed the conflict of a new war on religion, Huarte continually expressed his rejection of these attitudes. In Silvano a su hijo que iba voluntario de campaña, [Silvano to his Son who Voluntarily went to the Campaign], a poem written in 1795, Huarte displayed his condemnation of the alleged “war on religion”, saying that it was fanaticism that “invented that voice, unknown in the purest age of Christianity”. He also condemned the war against France in his work Anacreóntica a Don Antero Benito Núñez [Anacreontic to Don Antero Benito Núñez], written a year prior.

Huarte's work does not lack criticism of the ecclesiastical establishment and its vices and small hardships, which surfaced in the hilarious satirical piece El familiar del Obispo [The Bishop's Relative], perhaps one of his best poetic works. The bishop's fury over not achieving a longed-for canonry leads him to show off his alleged merits by charming the vicar's nieces, offering them promises of marriage that he never intended to keep, performing jobs without being fully prepared, faithfully serving the prelate whilst neglecting his intellectual training, as well as nepotism, ignorance and servility. According to these verses, these characteristics were present in the Church during the late 18th century.

Nevertheless, Huarte reserved his sharpest satirical remarks for ideas on probabilism, which led him to reject the Company completely and everything it entails, attributing to it a good part of the evils that afflicted the church. In his third satire, Contra los errores en las doctrinas morales y devociones falsas y supersticiosas [Against Errors in Moral Doctrines and False and Superstitious Devotions], he mercilessly condemns the laxity of theologians and confessors as well as the anti-Augustinian opinions of some Jesuits, and the mental laziness of theologians in general. He returns to these issues in his fourth satire: A la obra del ex jesuita Bonola, Liga de la Teología Moderna con la Filosofía, en daño de la Religión de Nuestro Señor Jesucristo [To the work by ex-Jesuit Bonola, Union of Modern Theology with Philosophy, Damaging the Religion of Our Lord Jesus Christ].

Various features of this author's work allow him to be included in the Jansenist movement that spread through Spain in the last years of the 18th century. These include his biblical and patristic culture, rejection of superstitions and legends without historical foundation, critical spirit, rejection of probabilism and laxity, which he identifies as Jesuit doctrines, moral rigorism, and love for the primitive Church. His philosophy displays the vitality, the cultural openness, and the desire for intellectual renewal of the best works in Cadiz at the time.
