= Pietro Andolfati =

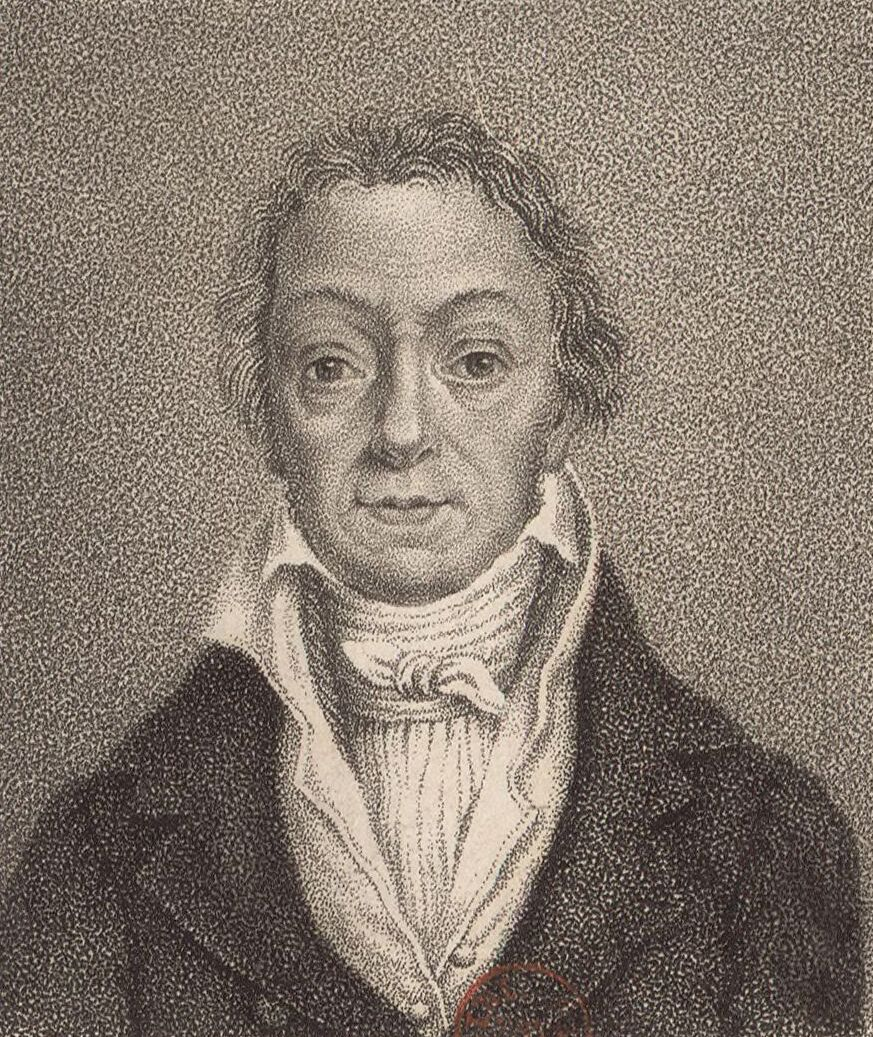
Portrait of Pietro Andolfati by Luigi Rados

Pietro Andolfati (c. 1750, Milan – c. 1830, Padua) was an actor and troupe director, active mainly in Northern Italy, mainly of comedies. He is also known as Pietro Attore Andolfatti.

He was born in a family of actors and actresses. His father, Bartolomeo Andolfati, was a Commedia dell'arte actor known for playing the role of Pantalone. His mother, and sisters were actresses, among the latter, Gaetana Goldóni Andolfati became also a well-known actress. His son, Giovanni Andolfati also became an actor.

Pietro played the commedia dell'arte role of the amoroso or innamorati for the theater company of P. Rossi, later became lead comic figure and director by 1792 in the theater in the via del Cocomero in Florence, then director of the Accademia dei Filodrammatici a Milano. He also was an independent author of drams and translator of French and Spanish works to Italian.

The Accademia Filodrammatica di Milano was in fact a theater company, but its theater building, designed by Polak and Canonica, promoted republican ideas, which by then were ascendant. It favored a natural equality for an audience, substituting private boxes with galleries. His colleagues in the theater circuit were Vincenzo Monti, Carlo Porta, and others. He also helped foster the careers of Francesco Righetti and Giuditta Pasta. The theater employed Andrea Appiani as a scenographer.

== Sources ==
- Boni, Filippo de' (1852). Biografia degli artisti ovvero dizionario della vita e delle opere dei pittori, degli scultori, degli intagliatori, dei tipografi e dei musici di ogni nazione che fiorirono da'tempi più remoti sino á nostri giorni. Seconda Edizione.. Venice; Googlebooks: Presso Andrea Santini e Figlio. p. 39.
- Treccani Encyclopedia entry
- Accademia dei Filodrammatici
- Dizionario biografico dei più celebri poeti ed artisti melodrammatici by Francesco Regli
