= Canadian Impressionism =

Subclass of Impressionist art

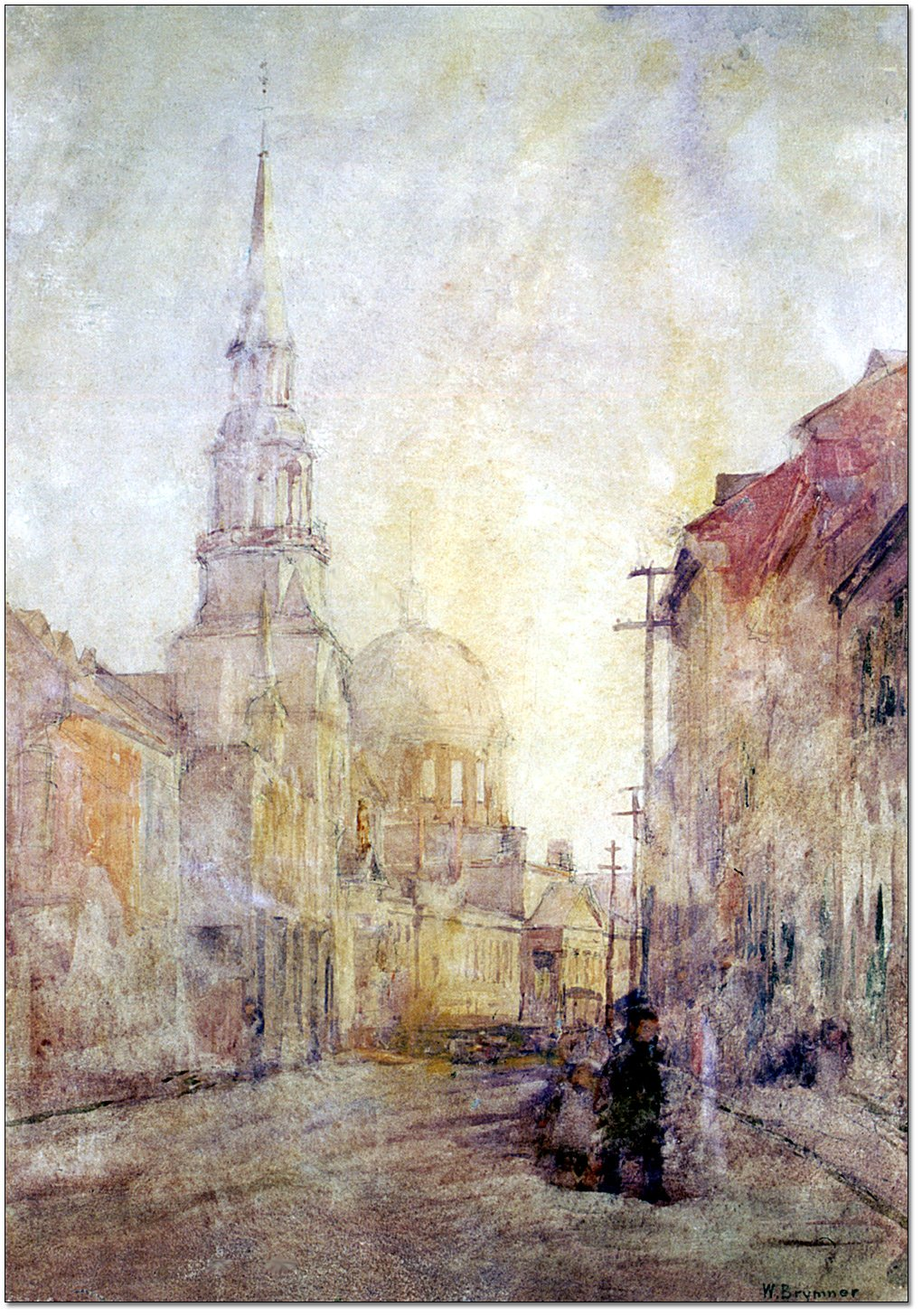
Bonsecours Church and Market, by William Brymner, 1913

Canadian Impressionism is a subclass of Impressionist art which had its origin in French Impressionism. Guy Wildenstein of the Wildenstein Institute in Paris states in the foreword of A.K. Prakash's Impressionism in Canada: A Journey of Rediscovery that Canadian impressionism consists of "the Canadian artists who gleaned much from the French but, in their improvisations, managed to transmute what they learned into an art reflecting the aesthetic concerns of their compatriots and the times in which they lived and worked". The early Canadian Impressionist painters belong in the "Group of who?" as coined by James Adams of The Globe and Mail.

== History ==
Canada's first affair with Impressionism occurred in 1892 in Montreal at W. Scott & Sons' premises. Eight paintings were exhibited including works of Monet, Renoir, Pissarro and Sisley. Montreal became the epicentre of Impressionism in Canada at the turn of the twentieth century. Numerous Canadian artists encountered Impressionism during their travels and studies in Europe, including Montreal-based William Brymner (1855–1925) and Helen McNicoll (1879–1915), and West Coast painter Emily Carr.

Brymner was one of the earliest Canadian artists to study in Paris, from 1878 to 1880; there he was introduced to the Impressionist works of contemporary French artists. In the mid-1890s, Brymner gave public talks about Impressionism. One took place in March 1896, for the Women's Art Association of Canada at the YMCA in Montreal. He gave another in April 1897, one of the special lectures he occasionally organized in his role as master of the School at the Art Association of Montreal from 1886 to 1921. Brymner taught numerous artists who became key figures in modern Canadian art, and without him, the Impressionist movement would not have taken root in the country.

One of Brymner's students at the Art Association of Montreal, McNicoll played a significant role in popularizing Impressionism in Canada. Following Brymner's advice to his students to travel to Europe to further their education, McNicoll moved to London in 1902. There, she may have visited the large exhibition of works by the French Impressionists organized by French art dealer Paul Durand-Ruel at the Grafton Galleries in London in 1905. McNicoll fully embraced the principles of French Impressionism, more so than any other Canadian artist of her time.

Canadian Impressionism was first recognized as a historical movement in Canadian Art in 1950.

== Artists ==
- Henri Beau
- William Blair Bruce
- William Brymner
- William Henry Clapp
- Mary Alberta Cleland
- Maurice Cullen
- Ernest Lawson
- James Wilson Morrice
- Helen McNicoll
- Laura Muntz

== Exhibitions ==
In 2019, the show Canada and Impressionism: New Horizons, curated by the National Gallery of Canada, visited Munich, Lausanne, and Montpellier. A second, somewhat modified exhibition, opened in Ottawa at the National Gallery in February 2022.
