= Joseph-Charles Franchère =

Canadian painter (1866–1921)

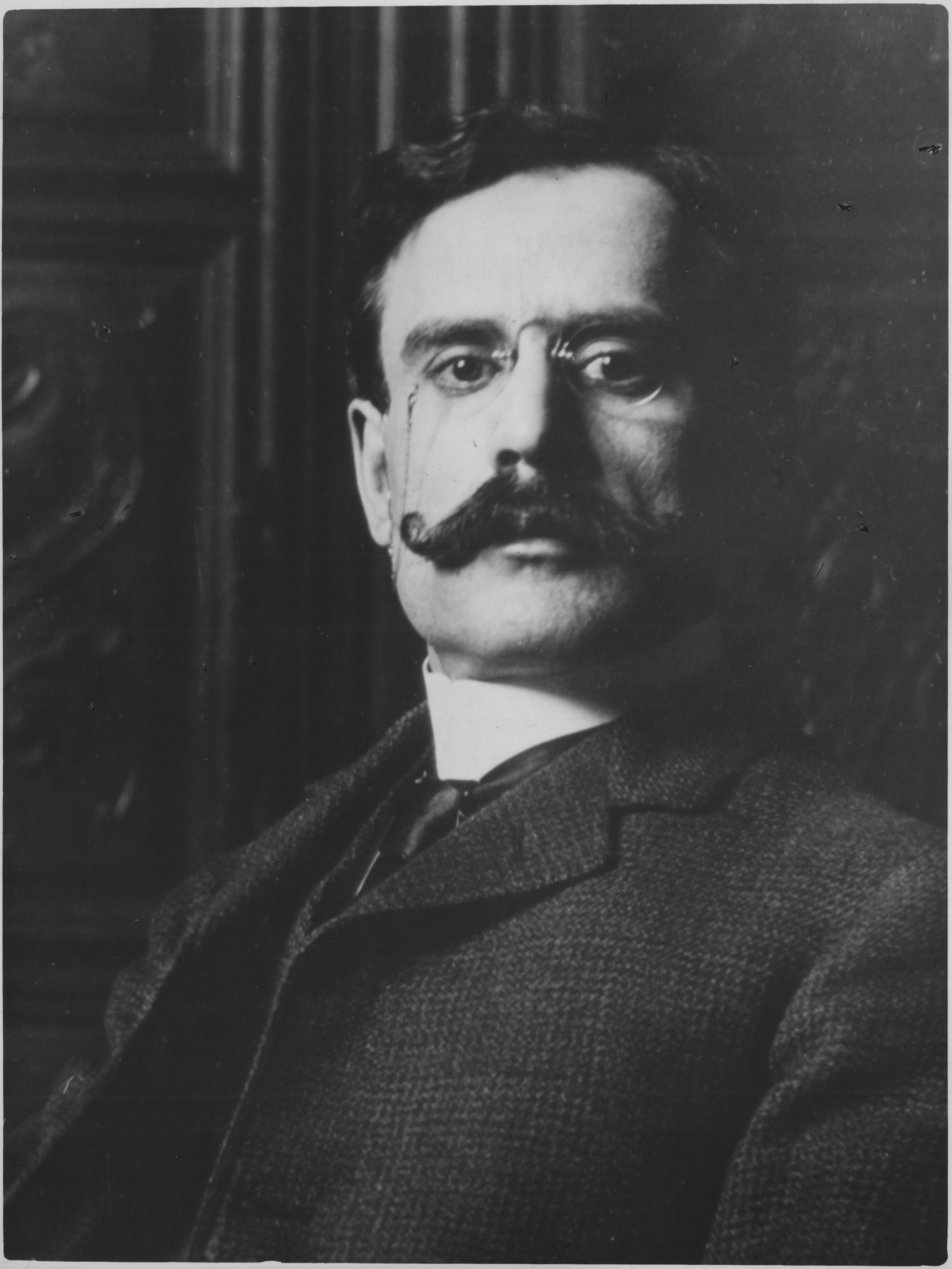
- Born: Joseph-Charles Franchère; March 3, 1866; Montreal, Quebec
- Died: May 2, 1921 (aged 55); Montreal, Quebec, Canada

Joseph-Charles Franchère (March 4, 1866 – May 12, 1921) was a painter, illustrator and church decorator in Montreal, Quebec.

== Biography ==
Joseph-Charles Franchère was born in Montreal and studied painting at the Conseil des arts et manufactures de la province de Québec with Joseph Chabert and in the studio of painter-decorator François-Xavier-Édouard Meloche. He then studied in Paris at the Académie Julian and at the Académie Colarossi from 1888 to 1889. He returned to Montreal in 1890 and along with his contemporaries Ludger Larose, Henri Beau, Joseph Saint-Charles and Charles Gill received a commission for Our Lady of the Sacred Heart of the basilica of Our Lady of Montreal.

He returned to Paris and painted three canvases: La Vierge de l'Apocalypse (1892), La Multiplication des pains (1893) and Le Christ consolateur des affligés (1895). During this time, Franchère gained admission to the École des Beaux-Arts and began submitting his work to the annual exhibitions of the Art Association of Montreal and to the Royal Canadian Academy of Arts. He won three honourable mentions while attending the Ecole des Beaux-Arts in Paris and two first prize medals as a student at evening shows in Paris. He was elected an associate and exhibited his work in Canada at the Royal Canadian Academy of Arts, and as part of the World's Fair in Chicago (1893), in Buffalo (1901) and in St. Louis (1904). He taught at the institute founded by Joseph Chabert as well as at National monument.

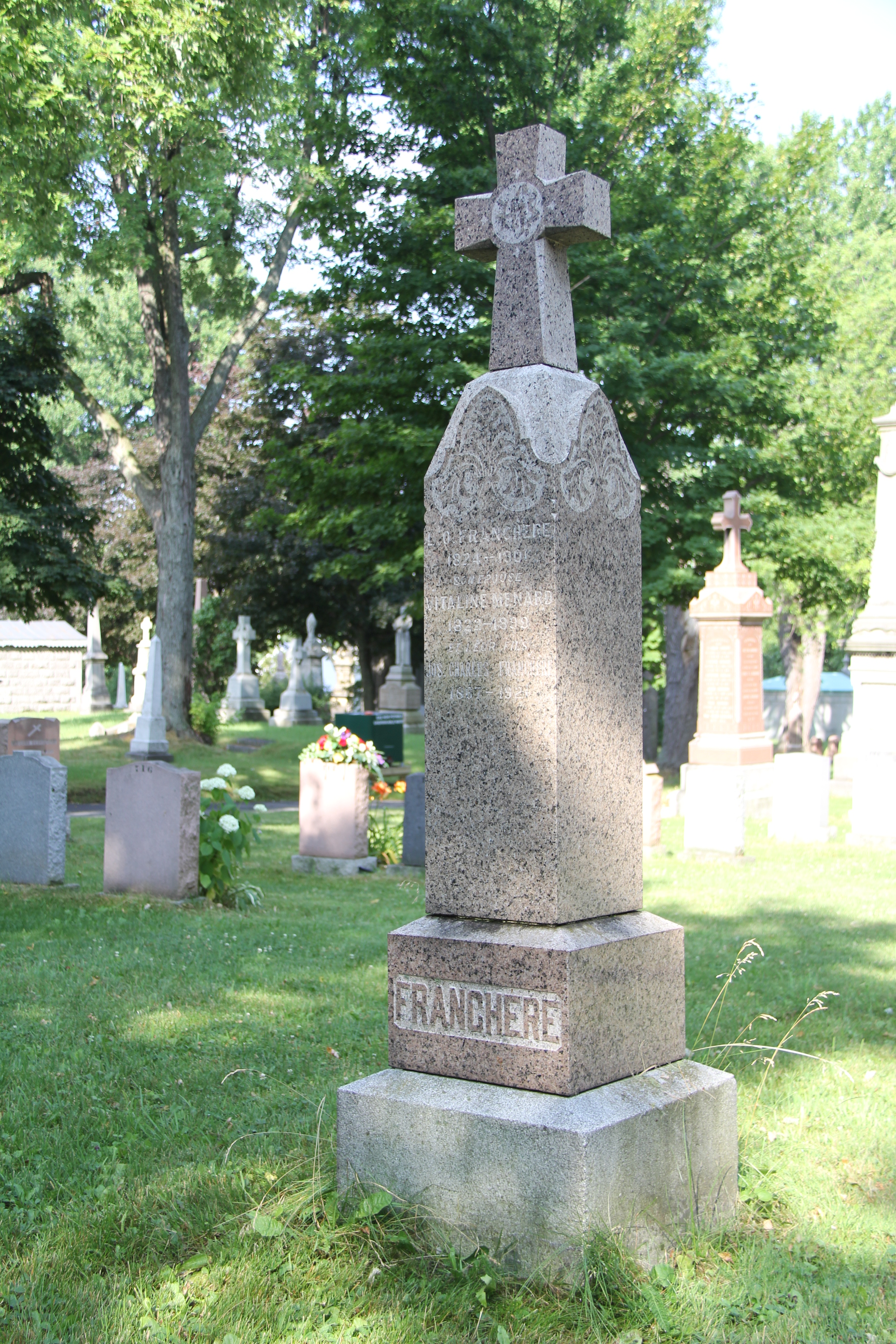
Tombstone of Joseph Charles Franchère (1867–1921)

He was also an illustrator and did book illustrations for Paul-Émile Prévost, Chansons canadiennes paroles et musique par nos Canadiens (1907) and his friend the abbot Lionel-Adolphe Groulx, Les Rapaillages (1916).

He died at age 55 on May 12, 1921, in Montreal and was entombed at the Notre Dame des Neiges Cemetery in Montreal.

== Works ==
- The Virgin of the apocalypse (1892)
- The Multiplication of the Loaves (1893)
- Christ consoling the afflicted (1895)
- Self portrait (1894), Musée national des beaux-arts du Québec
- Sillery seen from the Plains of Abraham (1895)
- Reading by the sea, Trois-Pistoles (1900), Musée national des beaux-arts du Québec
- Return from the ball (undated) (exhibited at the Joliette Art Museum)
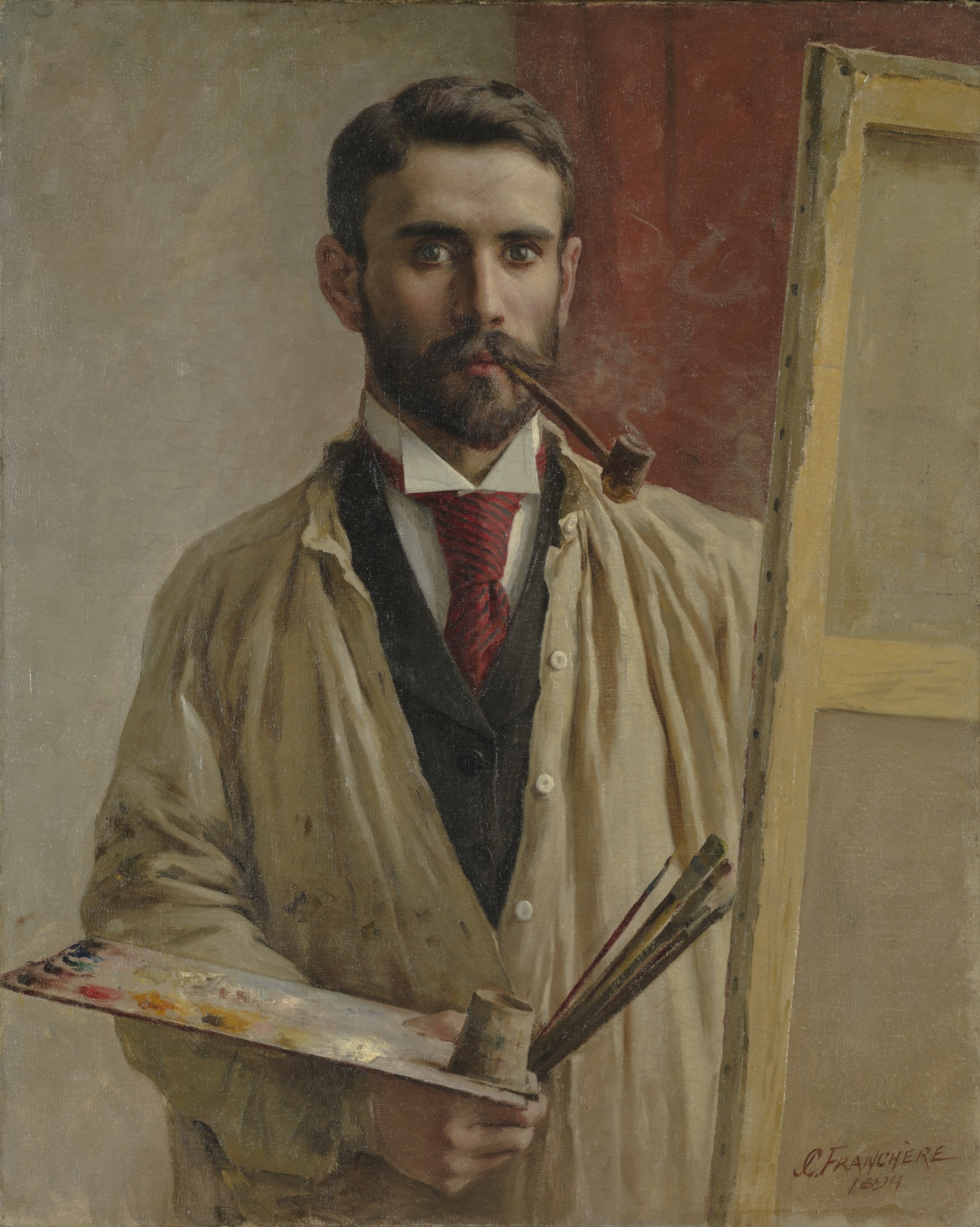
Joseph-Charles Franchère (self-portrait, 1894)

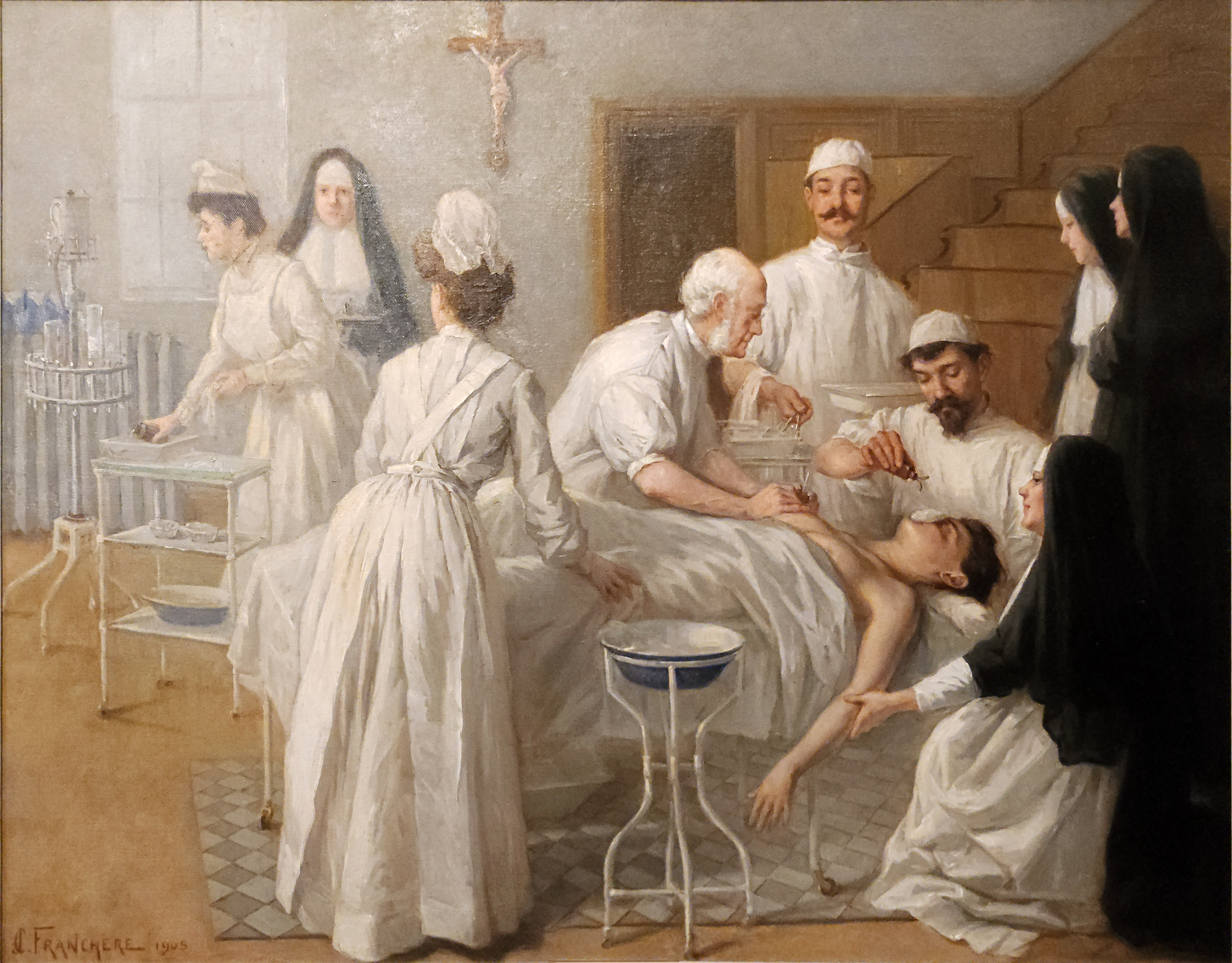
Dr. Hingston's operating room, 1905
