= Cajetan =

- Pronunciation: English: /ˈkædʒətən/ KAJ-ə-tən; German: [ˈkaːjetaːn] Polish: [kaˈjɛtan]

Origin
- Meaning: "from Gaeta"
- Region of origin: Gaeta, Italy

Other names
- Alternative spelling: Kajetan

Cajetan and Kajetan are Germanized and Slavicized forms of the Italian given name Gaetano. It is also a surname. People with this name include:

== Given name ==
- Saint Cajetan (1480–1547), Italian Catholic saint, priest and religious reformer
- Cajetan J. B. Baumann (1899–1969), Franciscan architect
- Cajetan von Felder (1814–1894), Austrian lawyer, entomologist and politician
- Cajetan Fernandes (born 1989), Indian footballer
- Cajetan Graf von Spreti (1905–1989), German Nazi Sturmabteilung officer
- Cajetan von Textor (1782–1860), German surgeon and professor
- Cajetan Tschink (1763–1813), Austrian writer, philosopher and professor
- Kajetan Duszyński (born 1995), Polish sprinter
- Kajetan Garbiński (1796–1847), Polish mathematician
- Kajetan Kovič (1931–2014), Slovene poet, writer, translator, and journalist
- Cajetan Lenz (born 2006), German footballer
- Kajetan von Mérey (1861–1931), Austro-Hungarian diplomat
- Kajetan Mühlmann (1898–1958), Austrian art historian and officer in the SS
- Cajetan Anton von Notthaft (1670–1752), Prince-Provost of Berchtesgaden in Bavaria
- Kajetan Stefanowicz (1886–1920), Polish Art-Nouveau painter and illustrator
- Kajetan Szmyt (born 2002), Polish footballer
- Cajetan, pseudonym of the Austrian physician and illustrator Anton Elfinger (1821–1864)

== Surname ==
- Constantino Cajetan (1560–1650), Italian Benedictine scholar
- Fabrice Caietain or Cajetan (fl. 1570-1578), Italian singer, songwriter and song publisher
- Thomas Cajetan (1469–1534), Italian Dominican theologian, cardinal, and opponent of Martin Luther

== See also ==
- Caetani (surname)
