= Gaetana Goldoni =

Italian actress

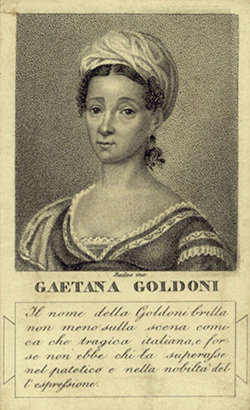
Portrait of Gaetana Goldoni by Luigi Rados

Gaetana Goldoni Andolfati (Venice. 1768 – Modena, 1830) was an actress, mainly in comedy, and active mainly in Northern Italy.

She is the daughter of the actor known for playing the role of Pantalone, Bartolomeo Andolfati. She trained with her father and then worked in the company of G. Grassi, and later in the company established by her brother Pietro Andolfati, the father of the actor Giovanni Andolfati. She married the actor Antonio Goldoni, and became a lead actress in his company. Till 1818, when she widowed and continued to work in the company with the son of Gaetana's sister Ana, (P. Riva), and continued the company after her nephew's death .

Colomberti, a contemporary described her as loose and playful in the comedy, noble and sensitive in the drama, statuesque in her gestures and imposing in declaiming tragedy. She was celebrated in a number of different roles including Merope in a play by Maffei, and in various heroine roles of Alfieri plays. Her most celebrated performance was as Semiramide in a play by Voltaire (translated by Pietro Andolfati).

== Sources ==
- Boni, Filippo de' (1852). Biografia degli artisti ovvero dizionario della vita e delle opere dei pittori, degli scultori, degli intagliatori, dei tipografi e dei musici di ogni nazione che fiorirono da'tempi più remoti sino á nostri giorni. Seconda Edizione.. Venice; Googlebooks: Presso Andrea Santini e Figlio. p. 171.
- Treccani Encyclopedia entry.
