= Notthafft =

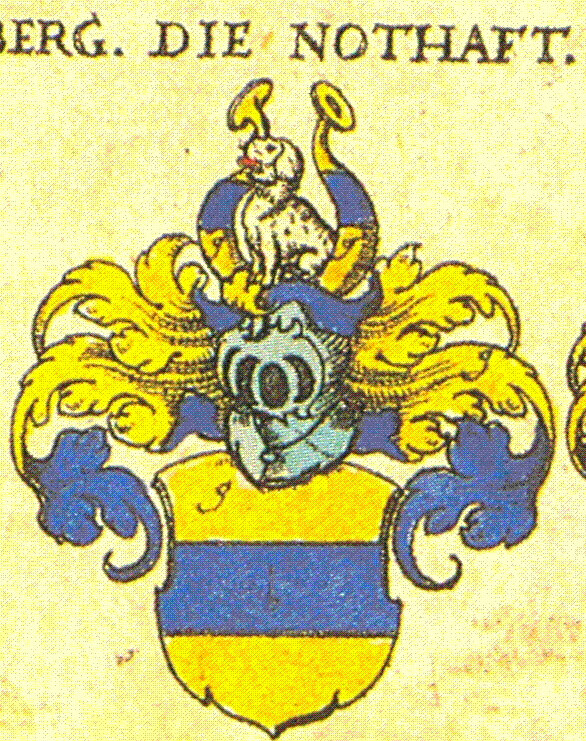
Coat of arms in Siebmachers Wappenbuch

The Notthafft family (also Nothafft, Notthaft, Nothaft) was an old German noble family.

== History ==
The history of the family started in the Egerland, with castles in Wildstein (now Skalná), Falkenau (now Sokolov) and Thierstein at the end of the 12th century. Up to the 18th century three lines existed, named by the most important castles, Wernberg, Weißenstein near Friedenfels and Bodenstein near Nittenau. The family is directly related with the House of Sparneck. It became Freiherren. A prominent member of the family is Cajetan Anton von Notthaft. The last male descendant died in 1952.

Beginning with the 14th century there was a Swabian family in the region of Remseck, carrying a different coat of arms. Though there is no familiar link found, the two families are regarded to be related.
