= Cajetan Anton von Notthaft =

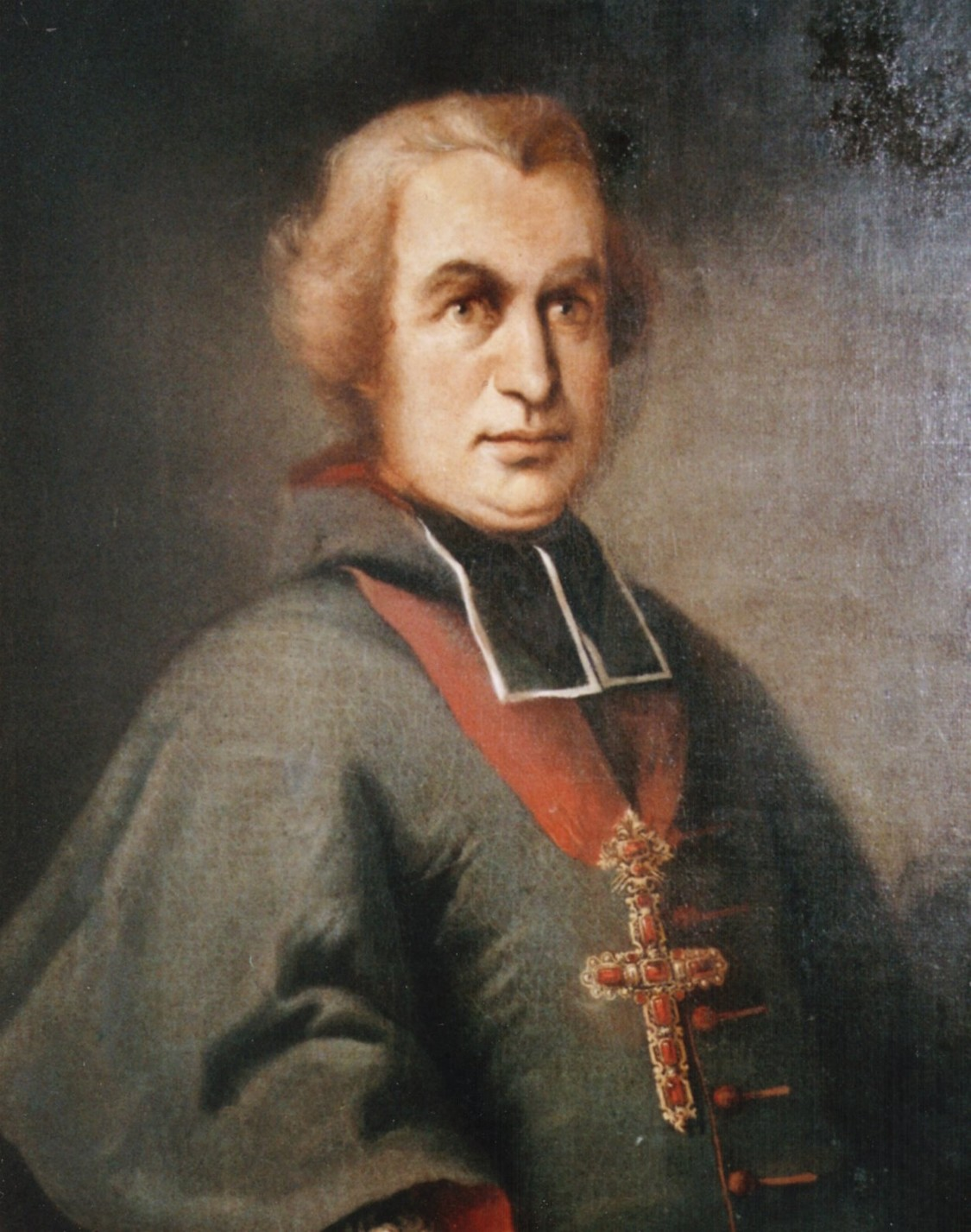
Cajetan Anton Notthafft von Weissenstein-Portrait

Cajetan Anton Freiherr Notthafft von Weißenstein (23 June 1670 – 4 July 1752) was a member of the House of Notthafft in the line named by Wernberg. From 1732 to 1752 he was Prince-Provost of Berchtesgaden in Bavaria.
