= Gaetana Russo =

Italian politician (born 1981)

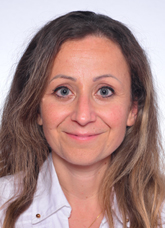
- Russo in 2022

Member of the Chamber of Deputies
- Incumbent
- Assumed office 13 October 2022
- Constituency: Emilia-Romagna – 01

Personal details
- Born: 25 April 1981 (age 44)
- Party: Brothers of Italy (since 2013)

Gaetana Russo (born 25 April 1981) is an Italian politician serving as a member of the Chamber of Deputies since 2022. She has been a member of Brothers of Italy since 2013.
