= Giovanni Andolfati =

Italian actor

Giovanni Andolfati was a 19th-century Italian actor, active in northern Italy, including Bologna, Parma, and Milan. He was the son of Pietro Andolfati.

His wife Natalina was often an artist in the same plays. Even his father played a role in some of his plays. They played at the Teatro alla Scala in Milan; the Teatro del Corso and of Arena del Sole in Bologna; the Obizzi theater in Padua; as well as theaters in Perugia and Faenza. His company specialized in comedies by Carlo Goldoni, and plays such as La moglie saggia, Le tre Zelinde, Pamela nubile, in Ottavia and in Antigone by Vittorio Alfieri and the Galeotto Manfredi by Vincenzo Monti. Giovanni, through excessive gambling, became penniless, and his company broke up by 1827. Giovanni and his wife were reduced to work for the company of the actress Carolina Internari. Natalina soon died of typhus after 1828. Andolfati also worked for the company of N. Medoni in 1834, as did his daughter Annetta.

== Sources ==
- Boni, Filippo de' (1852). Biografia degli artisti ovvero dizionario della vita e delle opere dei pittori, degli scultori, degli intagliatori, dei tipografi e dei musici di ogni nazione che fiorirono da'tempi più remoti sino á nostri giorni. Seconda Edizione.. Venice; Googlebooks: Presso Andrea Santini e Figlio. p. 171.
