= Gaspar de Molina y Zaldívar =

Spanish architect, painter, poet and writer

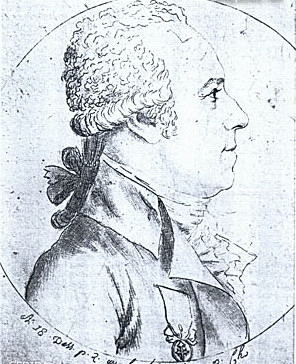
Gaspar de Molina y Zaldívar

Gaspar de Molina y Zaldívar (1741–1806) was a Spanish architect, painter, poet and writer.
