= Gaetano Gianola =

Gaetano Gianola was an Italian-American mobster and former consigliere of the Detroit Partnership criminal organization.

During the early years of the Partnership, it was controlled by Gianola's brother, Anthony "Tony" Gianola, with Gianola serving as consigliere and his younger brother, Salvatore, as the enforcer of the family.

The brothers dominated Detroit's underworld until the early 1920s.

== See also ==
- "Gasper Sciblia" Milazzo
- Angelo "Big Angelo" Meli
- Vito William "Black Bill" Tocco
- Giuseppe "Joey Z" Zerilli
- Anthony Joseph "Tony Z" Zerilli
- Giacamo William "Jack" Tocco
