= Cayetana =

Cayetana is a Spanish given name, the feminine form of Cayetano. It may refer to:

- Cayetana Aljovín (born 1966), Peruvian lawyer, journalist and former government minister
- Cayetana Álvarez de Toledo (born 1974), Spanish journalist and politician
- Cayetana Guillén Cuervo (born 1969), Spanish actress
- Cayetana Fernández (born 2005), Spanish amateur golfer
- Cayetana Elizabeth Hutcheson (born 1974), English author and television presenter
- Cayetana Fitz-James Stuart, 18th Duchess of Alba (1926–2014), Spanish aristocrat

== See also ==
- Cayetano
