= Wernberg-Köblitz =

Town in Bavaria, Germany

- Municipality
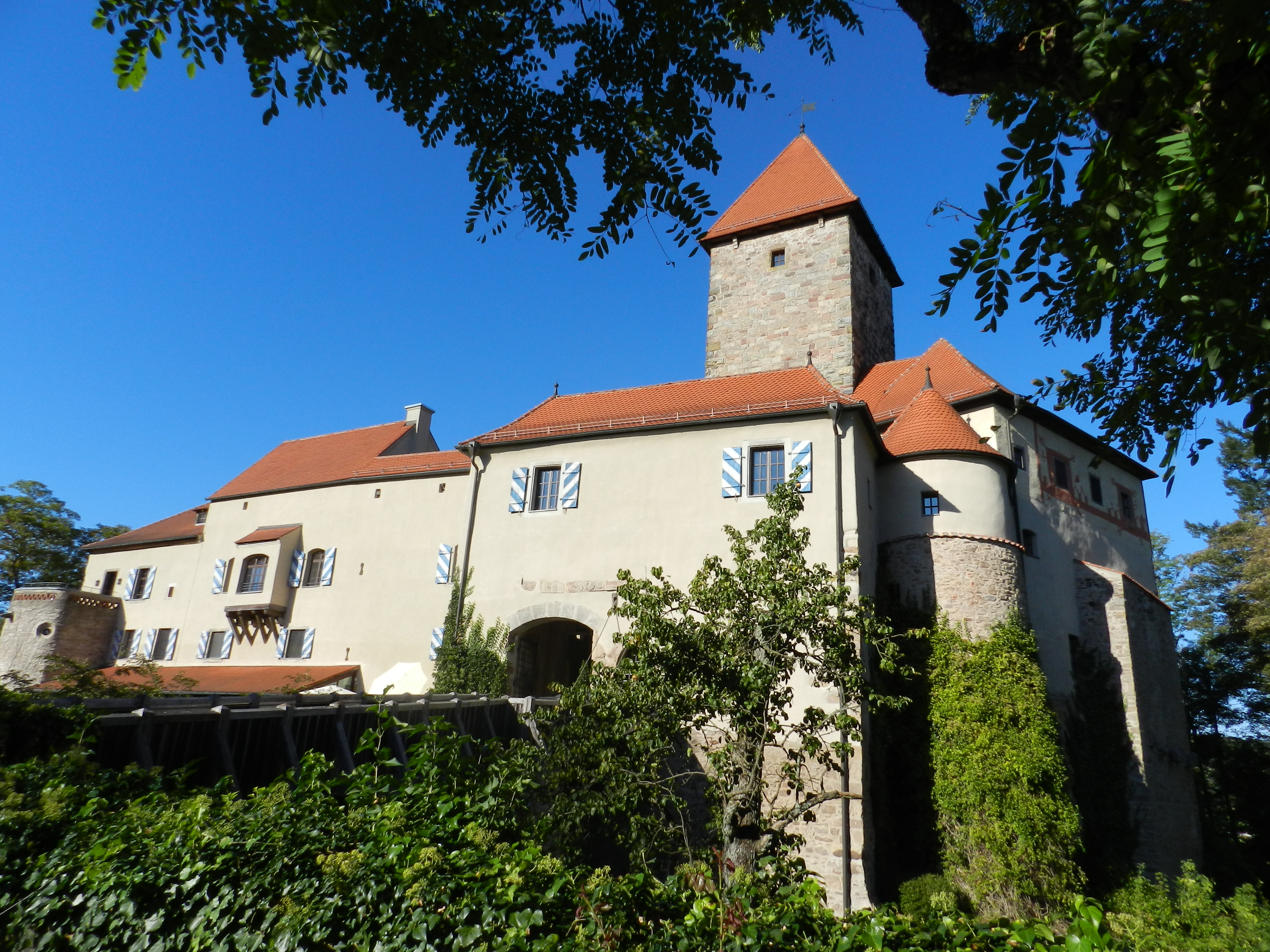
- Wernberg Castle

- Coat of arms

- Location of Wernberg-Köblitz within Schwandorf district
- Interactive map of Wernberg-Köblitz
- Location within Germany Location within Bavaria
- Coordinates: 49°32′N 12°9′E
- Country: Germany
- State: Bavaria
- Admin. region: Oberpfalz
- District: Schwandorf

Government
  - Mayor (2023–29): Konrad Kiener (CSU)

Area
  - Total: 66.07 km^{2} (25.51 sq mi)
- Elevation: 380–600 m (1,250–1,970 ft)

Population (2025-12-31)
  - Total: 5,490
  - Density: 83.1/km^{2} (215/sq mi)
- Time zone: UTC+01:00 (CET)
  - Summer (DST): UTC+02:00 (CEST)
- Postal codes: 92533
- Dialling codes: 0 96 04
- Vehicle registration: SAD
- Website: www.wernberg-koeblitz.de

Wernberg-Köblitz (German pronunciation: [ˈvɛʁnbɛʁk ˈkøːblɪts]) is a market town in the district of Schwandorf in Bavaria, Germany.

== History ==
The first mention of Wernberg Castle dates to 1280 when Konrad of Paulsdorfer bought the building. Later the castle became a possession of the noble Notthafft family.

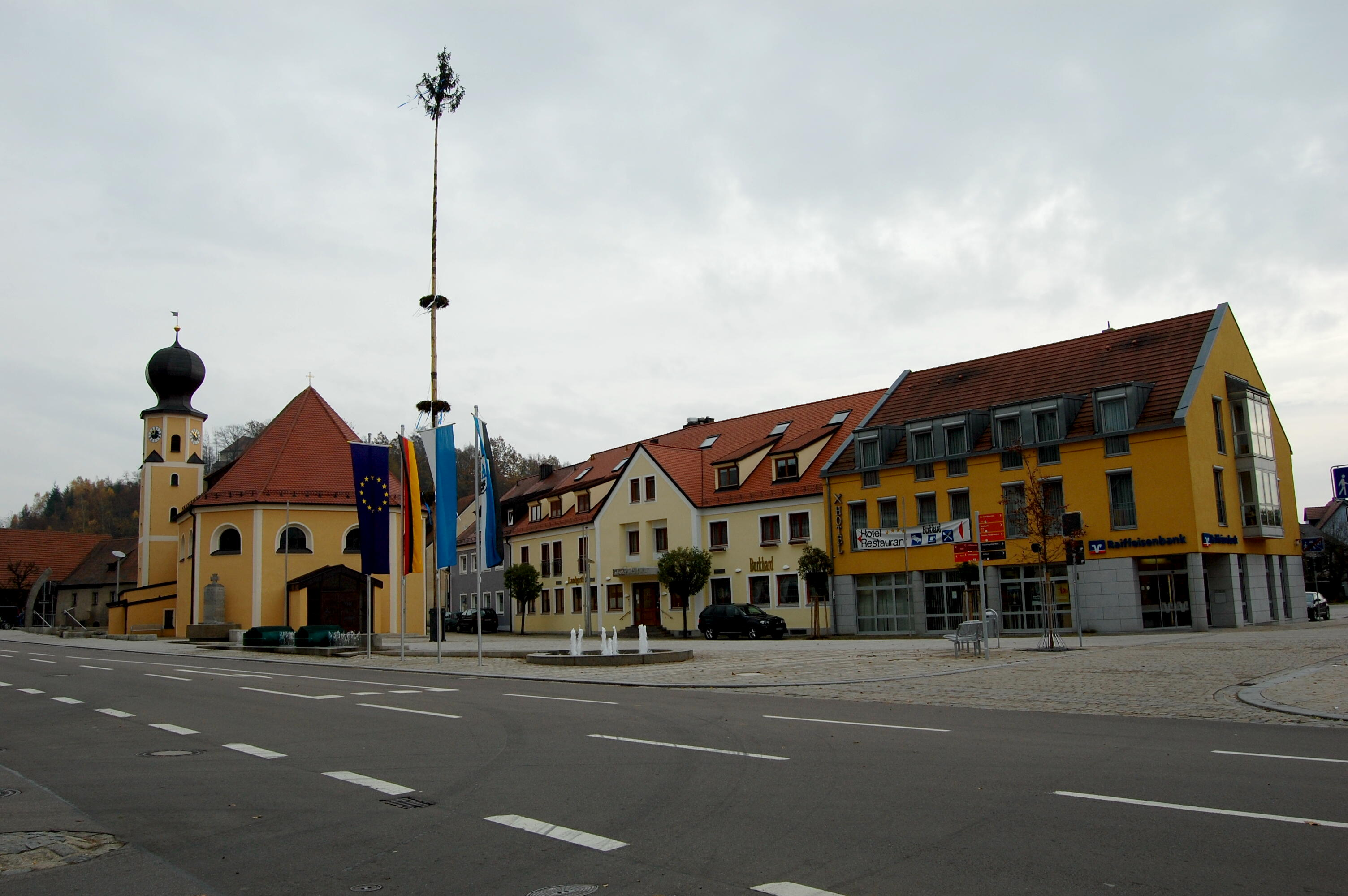
Wernberg-Köblitz
