= Gaëtane de Montreuil =

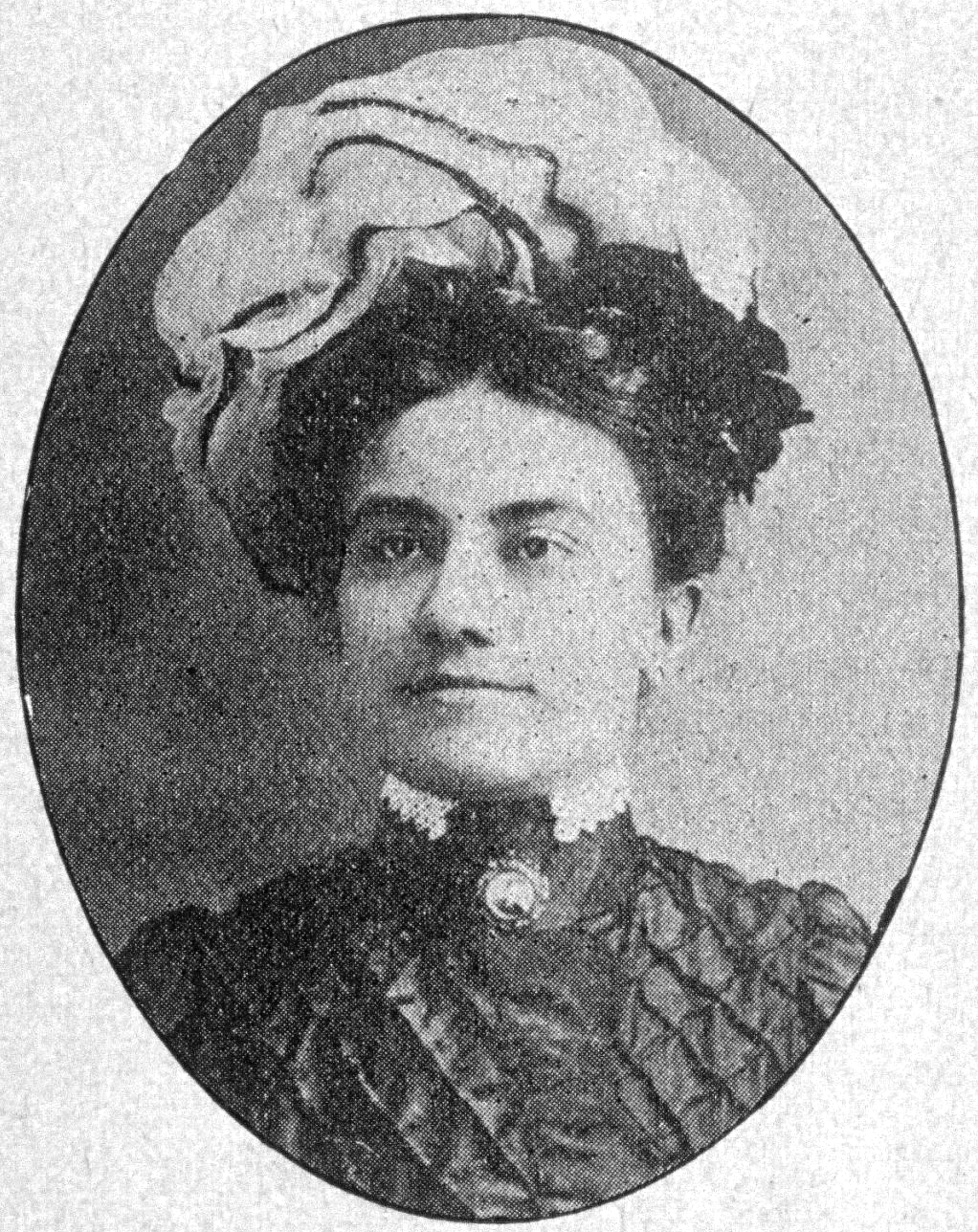
Gaëtane de Montreuil

Gaëtane de Montreuil was the pen name of Géorgina Bélanger (January 22, 1867 – June 24, 1951), a writer in Quebec. She has been described as one of the leading early Canadian women journalists.

The daughter of Ambroise Belanger and Berenice-Louise-Veronique Sedilot, she was born in Quebec City. She graduated from the École normale in 1885. She worked as a journalist for various publications including Le Coin du feu, Le Monde illustré and La Presse. In 1913, she started her own magazine Pour vous Mesdames, targeted at a female audience. She also published short stories and novels and, in 1917, a collection of poetry Les rêves morts. Her 1912 novel Fleur des ondes was very successful and she adapted it for the stage the following year.

In 1913, with Éva Circé-Côté, she founded the first lay institution of higher learning for young women in Quebec. De Montreuil is considered to be an early feminist.

She founded a society which promoted settlement in northern Quebec, Union des gens de chez nous.

De Montreuil married the painter Charles Gill in 1902; he died in 1918.

She died in Montreal at the age of 84.

Her life inspired Louise Simard's 1996 novel Le médaillon dérobé.

Rue Gaëtane-De Montreuil in Quebec City was named in her honour. There is also a Rue Gaëtane-De Montreuil in Lévis.
