= Charles Gill (artist) =

Canadian artist

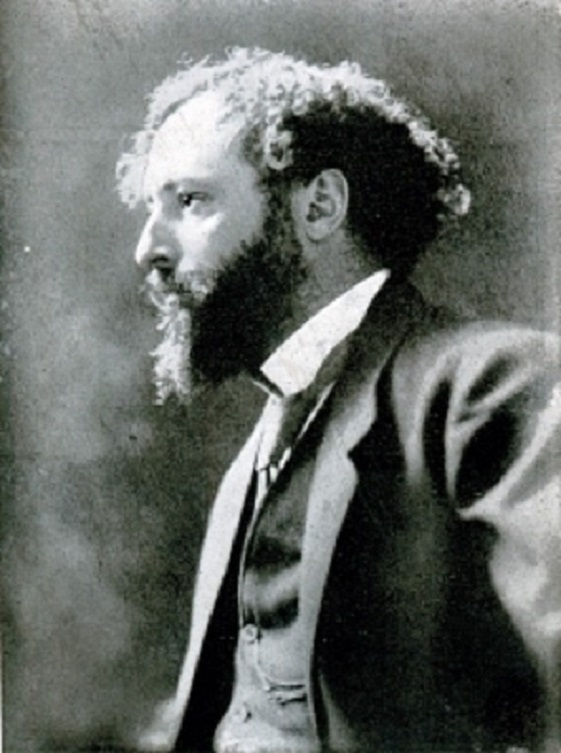
- Born: 21 October 1871; Sorel, Quebec
- Died: 16 October 1918 (aged 46)
- Education: Collège Sainte-Marie de Montréal, Collège de Nicolet and Collège Saint-Laurent,
- Known for: poet and painter
- Spouse(s): Georgine Bélanger (a.k.a. Gaëtane de Montreuil), (m. 12 May 1902)

Charles Ignace Adélard Gill (21 October 1871 – 16 October 1918) was a Canadian artist, specializing in poetry and painting. He also worked under the alternate names of Clairon and Léon Duval.

== Career ==
He was born at Sorel, Quebec to Charles-Ignace Gill and Marie-Rosalie Delphire Sénécal. He studied at Collège Sainte-Marie de Montréal, Collège de Nicolet and Collège Saint-Laurent, then George de Forest Brush, who was vacationing in Pierreville, undertook to develop Gill's talent for painting. As a result, he went to the Art Association of Montreal that 1888 to study with William Brymner. Encouraged by Brymner, he went to Paris and worked with Jean-Léon Gérôme at the École des Beaux-Arts. After returning to Montreal, he established his own studio in 1894.

He also published poetry in the anthology Les soirées du Château de Ramesay (1900). After his death a volume of his poetry was published under the title Le Cap Eternité, poème suivi des étoiles filantes (1919).

Gill had one son, Roger-Charles, with his wife Georgine Bélanger (a.k.a. Gaëtane de Montreuil, m. 12 May 1902). He died at Montreal from the 1918 flu pandemic just short of his 47th birthday.
