= Gaetano Morazzoni =

Italian politician (1932–2025)

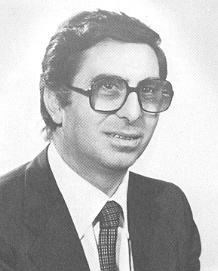
- Morazzoni in the 1970s

Member of the Chamber of Deputies of Italy for Milan
- In office 1 July 1976 – 11 July 1983

Personal details
- Born: 20 November 1932; Bovisio-Masciago, Italy
- Died: 24 June 2025 (aged 92); Milan, Italy
- Political party: DC
- Occupation: Lawyer

Gaetano Morazzoni (20 November 1932 – 24 June 2025) was an Italian politician. A member of Christian Democracy, he served in the Chamber of Deputies from 1976 to 1983.

Morazzoni died in Milan on 24 June 2025, at the age of 92.
