= Ampuero (surname) =

Ampuero is a surname. Notable people with the surname include:

- Álvaro Ampuero (born 1992), Peruvian footballer
- Branco Ampuero (born 1993), Chilean footballer
- Evelyn Ampuero (born 1987), Peruvian volleyball player
- Jorge Ampuero (born 1987), Chilean footballer
- José Joaquín Ampuero y del Río (1872–1932), Spanish politician and businessman
- José María Ampuero Jáuregui (1837–1917), Spanish politician
- Juan Carlos Sánchez Ampuero (born 1985), Bolivian footballer
- Ramón Miranda Ampuero (born 1926), Peruvian general and minister
- Roberto Ampuero (born 1953), Chilean author, columnist and minister
