= Lizarazo =

Lizarazo is a surname. Notable people with the surname include:

- Alfonso Lizarazo (born 1940), Colombian host and politician
- Carlos Lizarazo (born 1991), Colombian football player
- Jeinny Lizarazo (born 1988), Venezuelan actress, television hostess, and model
- Jose Antonio Osorio Lizarazo (1900–1964), Colombian writer
- Yuliana Lizarazo (born 1993), Colombian tennis player
