= Antonio Becerra Gaytán =

Mexican politician (1933–2026)

Member of the Chamber of Deputies of Mexico
- In office 1 September 1979 – 31 August 1982

Member of the Congress of Chihuahua
- In office 30 September 1989 – 29 September 1992

Personal details
- Born: 19 April 1933 Chihuahua City, Chihuahua, Mexico
- Died: 9 May 2026 (aged 93) Chihuahua City, Chihuahua, Mexico
- Party: PCM
- Occupation: Activist; Academic

Antonio Becerra Gaytán (Note: In this Mexican name, the surname is Becerra and the second or maternal family name is Gaytán.) (19 April 1933 – 9 May 2026) was a Mexican politician. Originally a member of the Mexican Communist Party (PCM), he was later among the founders of the Unified Socialist Party of Mexico (PSUM), the Mexican Socialist Party (PMS), the Party of the Democratic Revolution (PRD) and the National Regeneration Movement (Morena).

Between 1957 and 1975, he had a distinguished career teaching at various institutions in the state of Chihuahua, including the Autonomous University of Chihuahua.

In the 1979 legislative election, he was elected to a plurinominal seat in the Chamber of Deputies for the PCM, and he later served in the Congress of Chihuahua from 1989 to 1992.

Becerra died in Chihuahua City on 9 May 2026, at the age of 93.
