= José Joaquín Ampuero y del Río =

Spanish businessman and politician

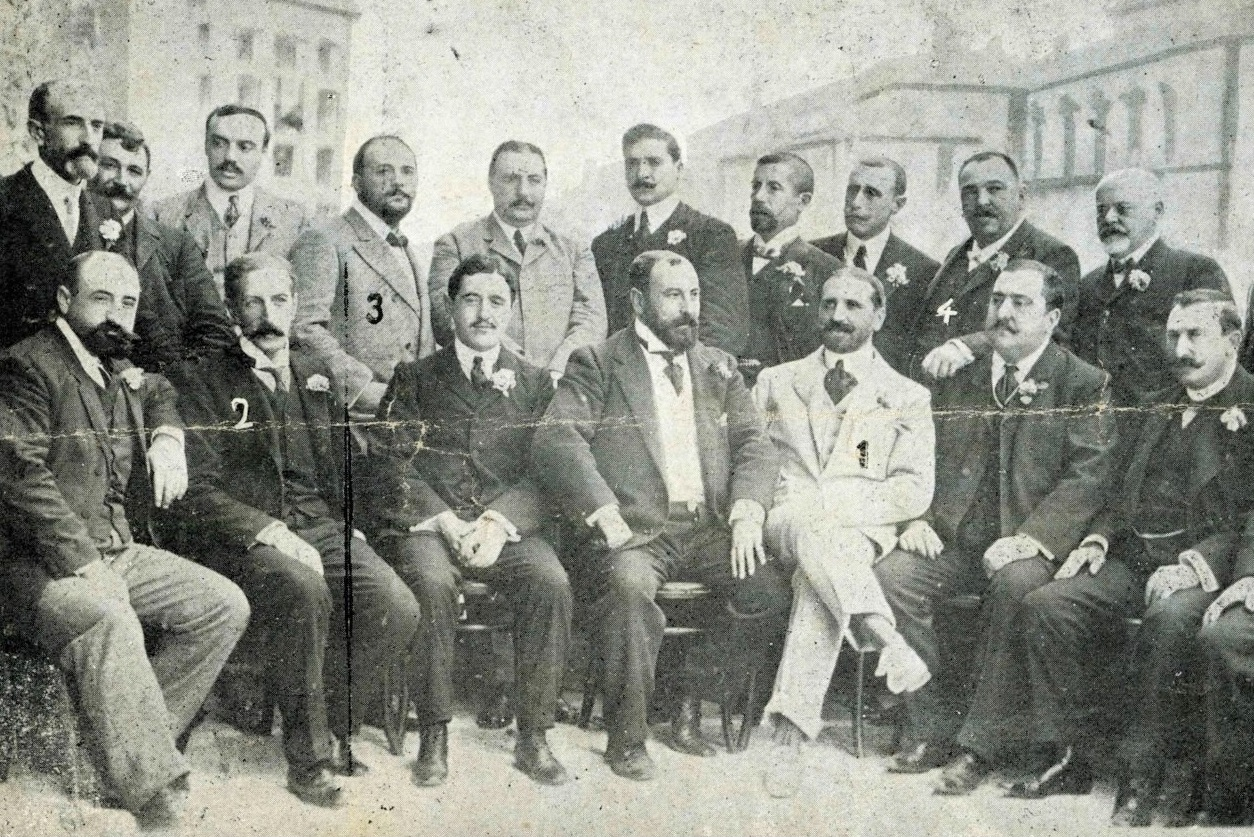
- Born: 1872; Durango, Biscay, Spain
- Died: 1932 (aged 59–60); Bilbao, Spain
- Occupation: businessman
- Known for: business, politics
- Political party: Carlism, Mellismo

José Joaquín Lucio Aurelio Ramón María de Ampuero y del Río (1872–1932) was a Spanish businessman and politician. As member of the Basque industrial and financial oligarchy he held seats in executive bodies of some 30 companies, especially Altos Hornos de Vizcaya and Banco de Bilbao. As politician he supported the Traditionalist cause, first as a Carlist and after 1919 as a breakaway Mellista. In 1901-1913 he served in the Biscay diputación, in 1916–1918 in Congreso de los Diputados, the lower house of the Cortes, and in 1919–1923 in the Senate.

== Family and youth ==
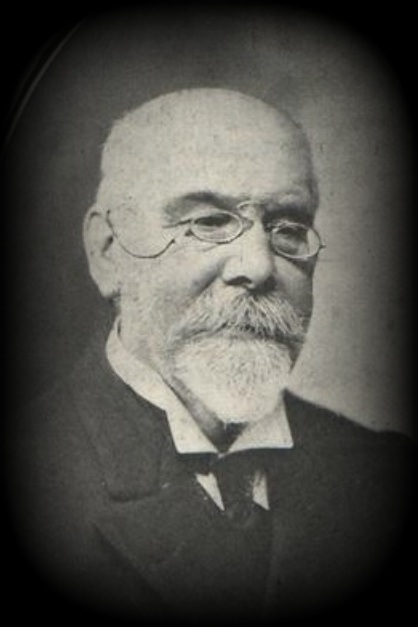
father

The first known representative of the family was Pedro Ampuero Ajo, who in 1704 integrated numerous possessions in Asturias into one mayorazgo. One branch of the Ampueros settled in Biscay, grew to major landholders in the province and inter-married with other prestigious families like the Urquijos. Paternal grandfather of José Joaquín, José Joaquín Ampuero Maguna, settled in Durango and as owner of numerous estates served in the Bilbao city council, holding also other county and provincial posts. His son and José Joaquín's father, José María Ampuero Jáuregui (1837-1917), inherited most of the wealth. Owner of at least 600 ha and devoted to agriculture and horticulture, he published in various periodicals, served as president of Sindicato Agrícola Vizcaíno and Junta Provincial de Agricultura; he was also active supporter of Basque culture, initiating Fiestas Eúskaras and similar festivals. Ampuero Jáuregui engaged in industry, co-founding Ferrocarril Central de Bizkaia and holding stakes in numerous enterprises from mining and metallurgy business. A zealous Carlist, he served as alcalde of Durango, provincial deputy, Cortes deputy (1881-1884), and senator (1907-1911).

Ampuero Jáuregui married María Milagro del Río Aguero and settled on the iconic family estate in Durango, known as the Eche Zuria palace. The couple had at least 5 children, 3 sons and 2 daughters; José Joaquín was born as the oldest one. Nothing is known on his early education; during the academic career he pursued two paths, one in law and another in philosophy and letters. According to one source he studied law in Deusto, but another one claims that he obtained his first grades in 1891 in Salamanca. He completed his career with doctorado, gained in 1896 in both derecho and filosofía y letras. In the mid-1890s he settled in Madrid and commenced co-operation with the Carlist daily, El Correo Español; it is not clear whether he practiced as a lawyer. At the turn of the centuries he returned to Biscay.

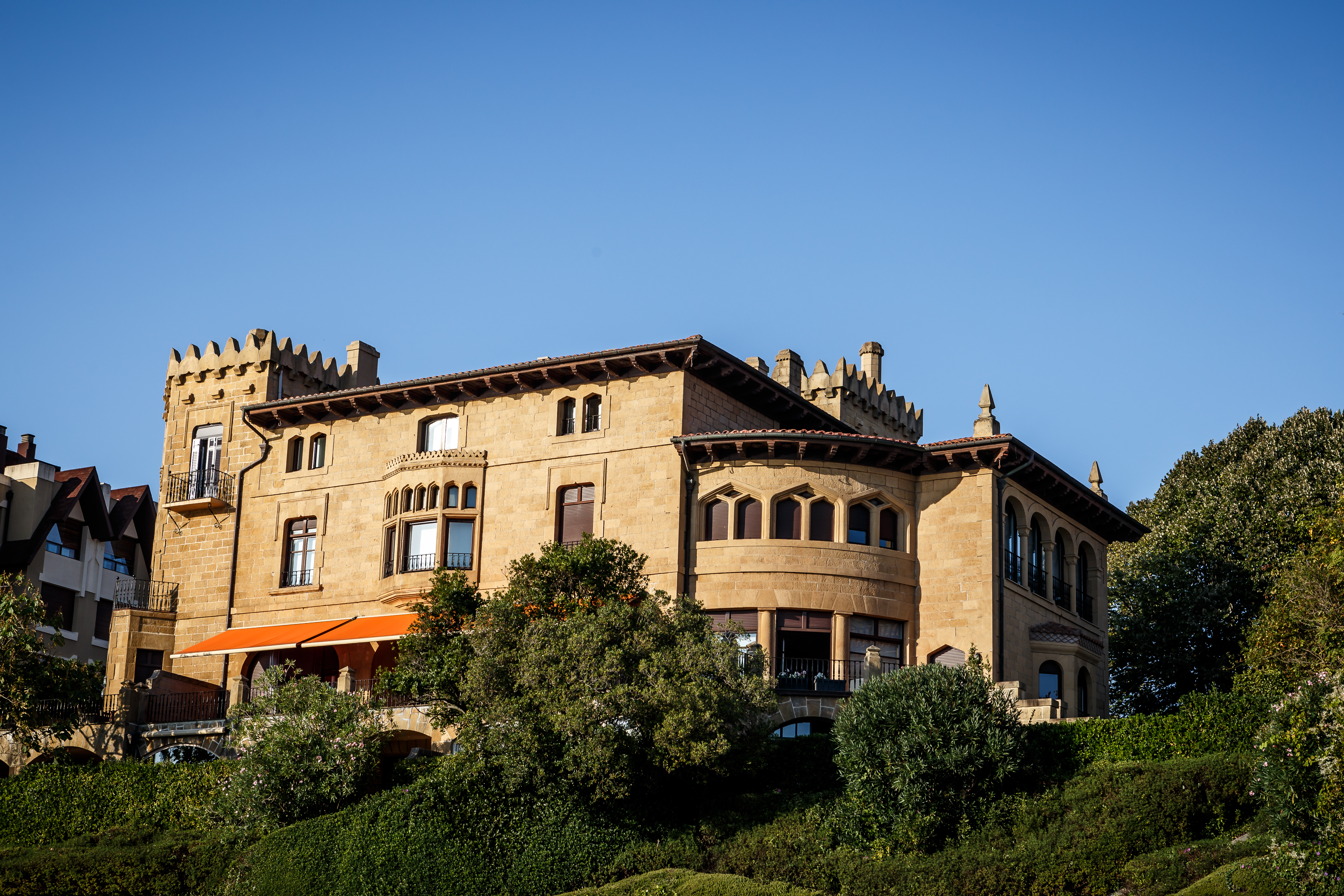
Palacio Ampuero, Getxo

In 1903 Ampuero married Casilda Gandarias Durañona (1872-1968), descendant to a powerful Basque industrialist family related to numerous mining and metallurgy enterprises. The couple first settled at the Durango Eche Zuria estate, but later they purchased and re-modeled a grandiose residential estate in Getxo, to be known as Palacio Ampuero. They had 3 children, born between 1906 and 1912; the best known was Casilda Ampuero Gandarias, the active Carlist herself who married general José Varela; José María and Pedro did not engage in politics and dedicated themselves to business, holding high executive posts in various companies. This was the case also of many Ampuero's grandchildren from the Varela Ampuero, Ampuero Urruela and Ampuero Osma families, though the best known one, Casilda Varela Ampuero, became sort of a media celebrity having married the world-famous guitar virtuoso, Paco de Lucia. Also great-grandchildren form part of the Ampuero business dynasty and as such are present in the gossip media; this is the case e.g. of Joaquín Güell Ampuero.

== Business oligarch ==
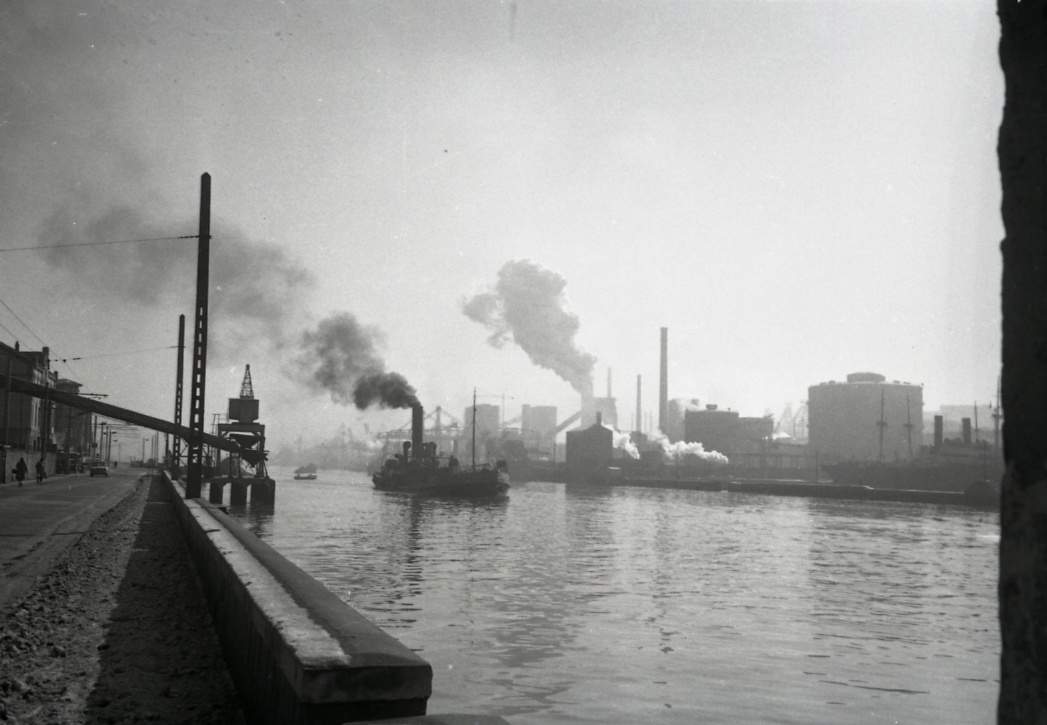
Altos Hornos de Vizcaya

Ampuero del Rio was born to a family of economic tycoons; though for decades its wealth was related to exploitation of the mountains with their chestnut and oak trees, agriculture, the leases of farmhouses, mills or ironworks, and interests produced by possessions, in the mid-19th century the Ampueros engaged in the Biscay mining revolution and re-oriented the fortune towards industry. José Joaquín started to replace his father in executive boards of various companies in the mid-1900s; at the same time he was setting up own enterprises, represented Biscay diputación in firms controlled by the provincial self-government, and got engaged in businesses of his in-laws, the Gandarias Durañona family. In the late 1910s and especially in the 1920s he emerged as one of key members of the Biscay industrial and financial strata, having been member of executive councils of at least 30 companies; by means of his family connections and business links he was positioned at intersection of various industries.

Ampuero's pivotal role was ensured by his membership in executive of Banco de Bilbao; he represented the bank in supervisory boards of numerous companies where BdB was one of major shareholders. He was also member of managing bodies of Banco del Comercio, Caja de Ahorros del Banco Asturiano and an insurance company La Polar. However, the key industry of the province was metallurgy; Ampuero held a seat in Consejo de Administración of Altos Hornos de Vizcaya, a giant soon to become the largest Spanish company. The related machinery business was represented by Basconia, Fundiciones Vera, Talleres de Gernica, Combustión Racional, Construcciones Electro-Mecánicas and Maquinaria Eléctrica; apart from sitting in their management boards, Ampuero co-founded some of these companies. He supervised and held shares of numerous mining companies, active in Biscay (Minera Morro), Asturias (Hulleras del Turón, Minas de Teverga) and Andalusia (Minas de Alcaracejos, Coto Teuler, Argentífera). The largest railway firm he was engaged in was Caminos de Hierro del Norte; others included La Robla, Ferrocarril Bilbao-Portugalete, Ferrocarril Amorebieta-Guernica-Pedernales, Compañía de los Ferrocarriles Vascongados, Compañía del Ferrocarril Central de Aragón and Ferrocarril de Triano. Construction companies were represented by Sdad. Española de Construcciones, Sociedad de Obras y Construcciónes de Bilbao, and Sociedad Española de Construcción Naval, glass industry by Vidrieras S.A. and other branches by Basauri S.A.

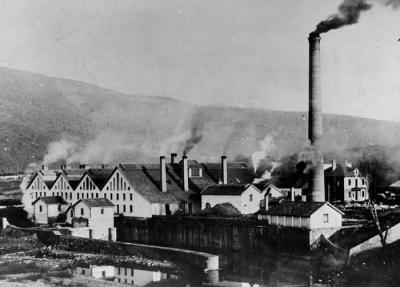
Basconia

In most companies Ampuero performed the supervisory role, representing institutional shareholders like Banco de Bilbao, private investors or his family; cases of himself assuming a managing role are rare and are either related to rotative presidency scheme or to smaller enterprises he co-founded. In rather few cases he is noted as having a role in key business decisions, though in the late 1920s he was among most prestigious Biscay entrepreneurs and there was a street named after him in the Zabala district of Bilbao. Ampuero held key posts – e.g. in Banco de Bilbao, Altos Hornos or Norte - until death and in historiography is considered one of key members of the Basque financial and industrial oligarchy of the early 20th century.

== Carlist ==
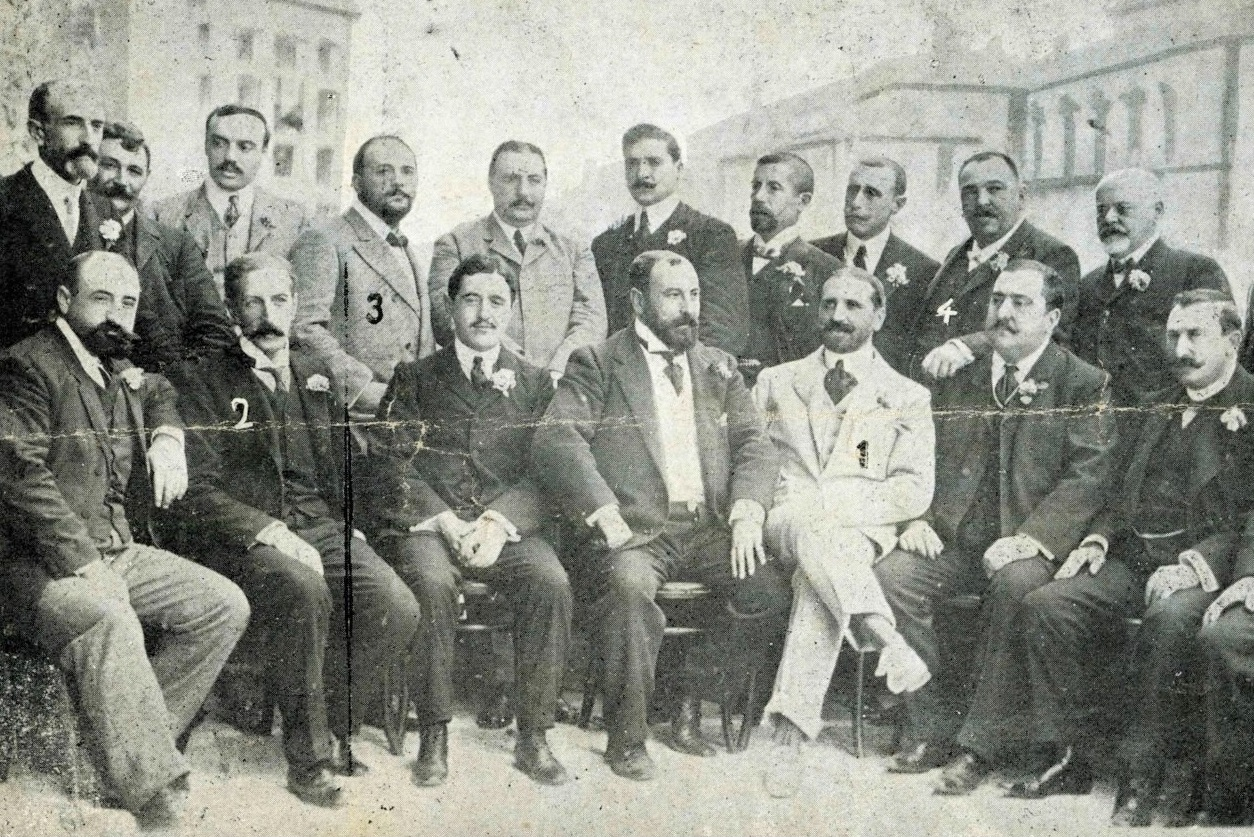
Ampuero among Basque negotiators of Concierto Economico, 1906

The father of José Joaquín was an ardent Carlist; as such he was served in the Cortes in 1881-1884 and at the turn of the centuries he remained one of key party politicians in the province. Ampuero del Rio from his youth followed in the footsteps of his parent, though initially it appeared that he would rather become a propagandist and publisher. During his academic period and during the Madrid spell of the 1890s he became a permanent collaborator of the unofficial Carlist press mouthpiece, El Correo Español. Under his own name he provided local correspondence, wrote brief biographies of Traditionalist pundits, spoke against secularization tide at the universities, defended Basque fueros or even published poems, like the one dedicated to the new wife of Carlist king Carlos VII, Berthe de Rohán. As a young lecturer he gave conferences or represented El Correo at meetings with distinguished personalities, like the papal nuncio. None of the sources consulted confirms engagement in party structures; however, in wake of Carlist conspiracy and few minor disturbances of late 1900, known as La Octubrada, he was briefly detained.

Before turning 30 Ampuero was catapulted to public power when in 1901 and thanks to the role and position enjoyed by his father, he was elected from the district of Durango to the Biscay diputación provincial, the local self-government; as a Carlist candidate he would be re-elected for two successive terms, commencing in 1905 and 1909. Though in diputación he was engaged in various fields like education, he was best known as negotiator of Concierto Económico, namely in 1906 and 1908; he was already known as vehement supporter of provincial foral establishments. At numerous occasions he merged his official and party duties, e.g. attending a Carlist feast of 1907, representing diputación at the funeral of Carlos VII in Trieste in 1909 or hosting the party theorist and rising political star Juan Vázquez de Mella in 1911.

Carlist standard

Following a brief break after he had ceased as diputación member in the mid-1910s, Ampuero decided to enter national politics. Far from zealous militancy, he was at decent terms with other parties; standing as Jaimista in the 1916 elections to the lower house of the Cortes, he defeated datista, Basque nationalist and independent candidates and was comfortably elected from his native Durango district. Member of the tiny, 9-member Carlist minority, Ampuero was moderately involved when speaking in defense of religious orders or engaged in economic lobbying. He was also busy supporting the regionalist cause, not only for Vascongadas but also for Catalonia, hailed by the Biscay party organisation as their representative in Madrid. Together with other Basque Carlist leaders like Estebán Bilbao, Julián Elorza or marqués de Valde-Espina in 1918 he supported Asamblea Tradicionalista Vasca, attempting to channel the rising Basque nationalism into Traditionalism. His term in the Cortes expired in 1918; initially he intended to run for re-election and was listed as a Jaimista candidate from Durango, but eventually he withdrew.

== Mellista ==
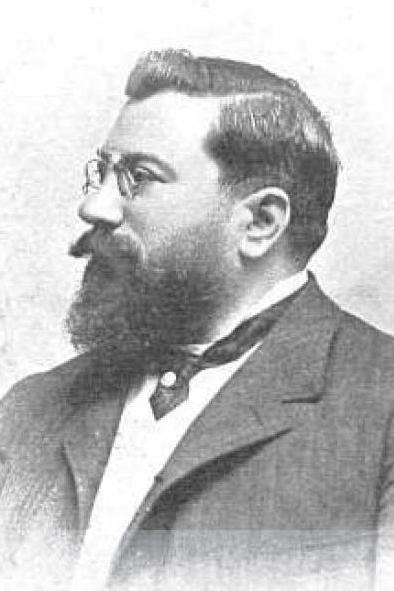
Vázquez de Mella

In the 1910s Carlism was plagued by a conflict between the claimant Don Jaime and the key party theorist, Vázquez de Mella; the points of contention was the role of dynastical objectives and the nature of would-be alliance with other parties. Ampuero, who following the 1917 death of his father emerged as the key party man in Biscay, tended to side with de Mella. In 1918 he was heavily inclined towards a broad right-wing coalition with the Alfonsists and nationalists; the faction, known as La Piña, was ridiculed by orthodox Jaimistas as “piñosos con boinas”. The conflict climaxed in early 1919, when the Mellistas broke away to build their own party. Ampuero decided to join the dissenters; he entered their local executive, Junta Señorial Tradicionalista de Vizcaya, and with Ignacio Gardeazábal was co-leading the Biscay Mellistas.

In mid-1919 Ampuero fielded his candidacy for the Senate, the chamber elected not in popular elections but during behind-the-scenes deals within various provincial institutions; like his father, he stood not in his native Biscay but in the neighboring Gipuzkoa. Banking on prestige of late Ampuero Jáuregui, own position as business tycoon, Traditionalist following in the province and conciliatory approach towards other parties, he was comfortably elected; his seat was confirmed for the following legislatures of 1921, 1922 and 1923. In the Senate he represented the tiny, 2-member Mellista minority. Though member of numerous committees, he was hardly active; his interventions were related mostly to economic issues. His term expired in late 1923, when Primo de Rivera coup produced dissolution of the legislative.

The year of 1923 marked also the last Traditionalist Ampuero's engagements. In the early 1920s supportive of “un gran partido nacional de derechas”, he was somewhat less strict than de Mella when seeking alliances and tended towards a broad right-wing monarchist accord; he neither shared de Mella's intransigence versus the restoration regime. Not particularly active during buildup of the Mellista party, he was missing during the grand Zaragoza assembly of 1922; his last engagement noted was speaking at a Mellista rally in Mondragón in 1923.

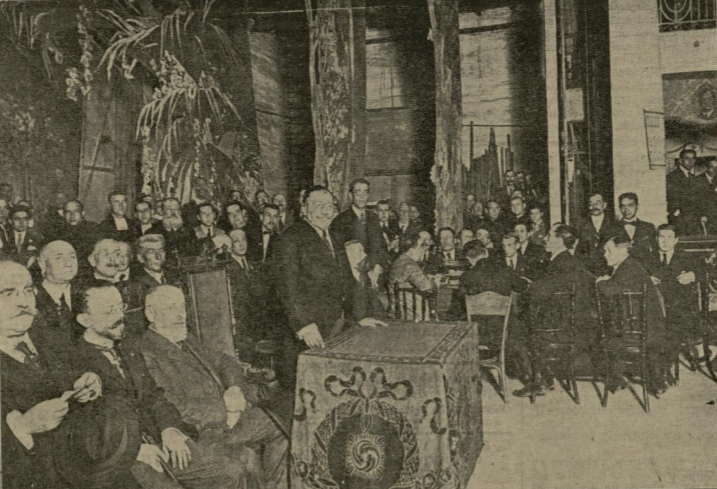
Mellista meeting, early 1920s

Following the Primo coup he withdrew into business, refrained from any political activity and is not known for taking part in primoderiverista institutions, though his corporate engagements at times brought him closer to the officialdom. Once the Republic has been declared, Ampuero did not resume his Traditionalist activities; he is not known as re-entering the united Carlist organization, Comunión Tradicionalista. His only initiative was co-signing a 1931 letter addressed to president Niceto Alcalá-Zamora, which protested secularization policy, asked that Catholic rights be respected and religious orders be left unmolested. Ampuero died due to intracerebral hemorrhage he suffered when returning from religious service for the souls of guardias civiles, killed during so-called Sucesos de Castilblanco.

== See also ==
- Traditionalism
- Carlism
- Mellismo
- Palacio Ampuero
- José María Ampuero Jáuregui
