= José Antonio Osorio Lizarazo =

Colombian writer

- Born: December 30, 1900; Bogotá, Colombia
- Died: October 12, 1964 (aged 63); Bogotá, Colombia

Jose Antonio Osorio Lizarazo (December 30, 1900 – October 12, 1964) was a Colombian writer.

== Life and work ==
He was born and raised in Bogotá. He graduated from the Colegio San Bartolomé Nacional in 1916. He then went into journalism; by the age of 23, he was already an experienced journalist, working for the daily Mundo al Día. He was known as a sharp observer of Bogotá society. Osorio wrote for almost all the newspapers in the capital, usually under his own name but sometimes under the pseudonym El Solitario.

He ran a number of newspapers during his career: Diario Nacional, El Heraldo and the Barranquilla newspaper La Prensa. He also worked at Sábado and Jornada, the latter a Gaitan-supporting newspaper. He fulfilled a number of public roles too: private secretary to the ministers of war and education, and director of publications at the Comptroller General’s office.

In 1946, after parting with Jorge Eliécer Gaitán, he left Colombia to begin his extensive travels across Latin America. When Gaitan was assassinated in April 1948, Osorio was living in Buenos Aires. The event drove him to write the novel El día del odio (1952), a detailed account of the days leading up to the Bogotazo. His decade-long stay in Argentina was also significant in other ways. He kept close ties with Juan Domingo Perón, until the fall of the latter from power in 1955.

Later on, Osorio lived in Chile and in the Dominican Republic. He was an intimate of the Dominican dictator Rafael Leonidas Trujillo, who ran the island nation directly from 1930 to 1952, and later on through his brother Héctor Bienvenido. Osorio worked at the house paper of the dictatorship, and also wrote a biography of Trujillo, titled Así es Trujillo (1958). He wrote several other politically compromised books around this time. He came back to Colombia in 1961, resettling in Bogotá.

In the last years of his life, he finished writing the novel El camino en la sombra which won the first Esso Prize (now extinct) in 1963. In all, Osorio published two dozen books, including 11 novels, starting with his well-regarded debut novel La casa de vecindad in 1930. Three of his "urban novels" were reissued at the 2013 Feria del Libro de Bogotá: La casa de vecindad (1930), Garabato (1939) and El camino en la sombra (1964).

Osorio married his secretary Eri in 1945. She was 26 years his junior. They had two daughters, María Cristina and Sandra Marcela. He died on October 12, 1964, at the Hospital San José. He was buried at the Cementerio Central in Bogotá but seven years later his ashes were re-interred in the basement of Our Lady of Lourdes Church in the district of Chapinero to the north of Bogotá.
