= José María Ampuero Jáuregui =

Spanish Carlist politician

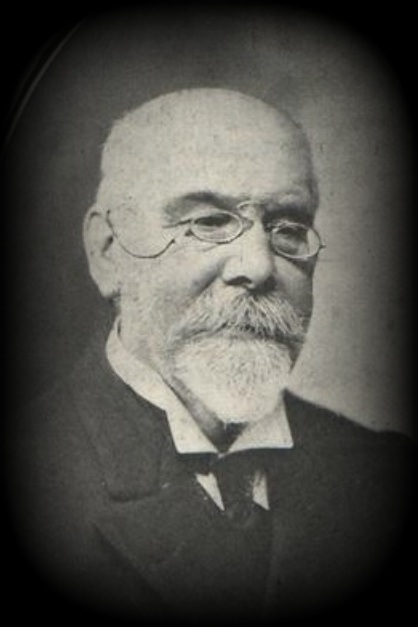
- Born: 1837; Durango, Biscay, Spain
- Died: 1917 (aged 79–80); Durango, Spain
- Occupations: landholder, businessman
- Known for: politics
- Political party: Carlism

José María Ampuero Jáuregui (1837-1917) was a Spanish Carlist politician. In 1881-1884 he served one term in the lower house of the Cortes, in 1907-1913 during two terms he held the Senate ticket, and during a few separate strings between the 1880s and the 1910s he was a member of the Biscay provincial self-government, diputación. At the turn of centuries acting as second-in-command of the Biscay party organization, in the mid-1910s he was briefly a member of the Carlist national executive. Currently he is known mostly as fervent advocate of Basque culture and separate Basque provincial establishments, which he promoted as publisher, organizer and politician.

== Family and youth ==
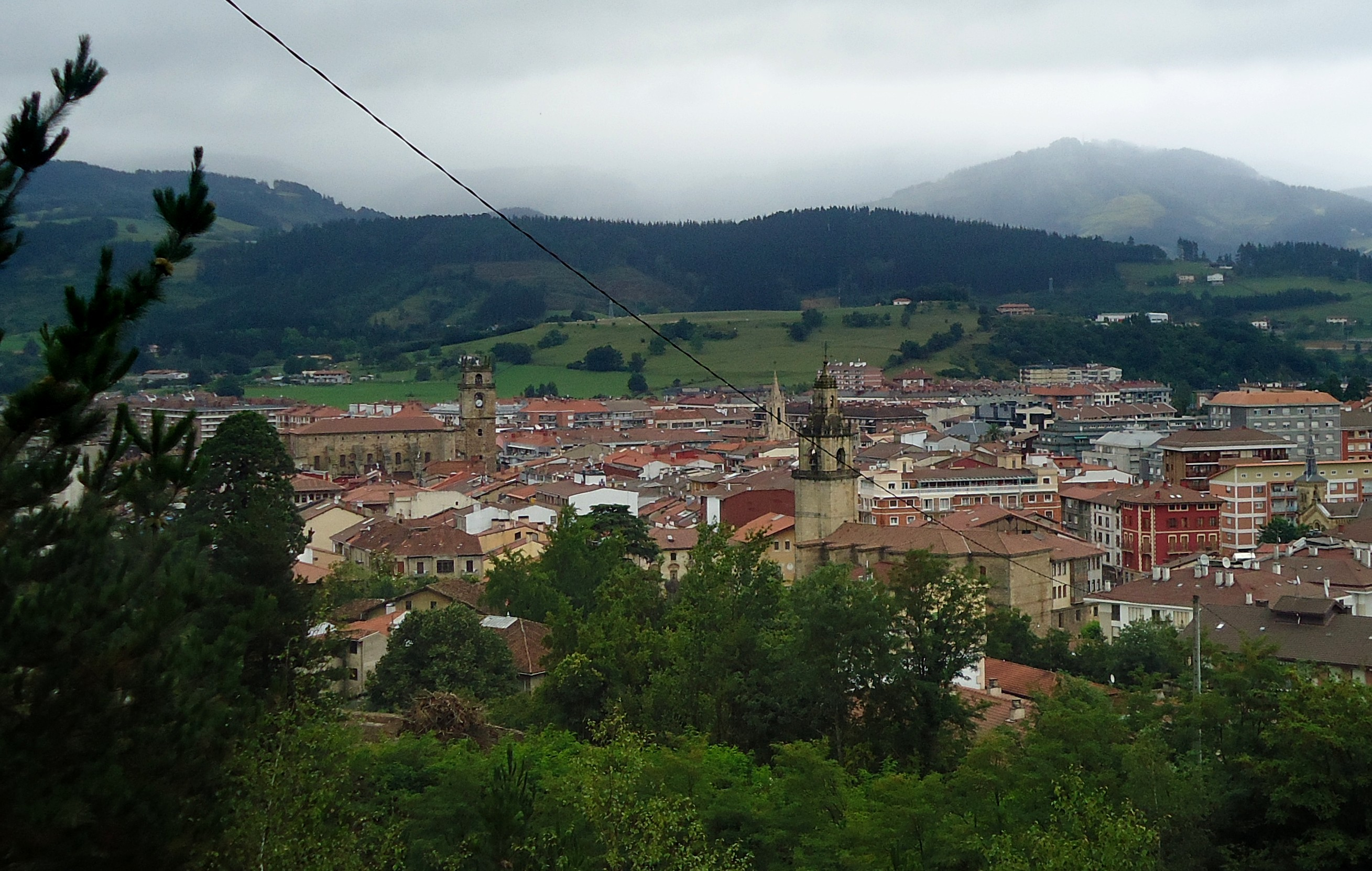
Durango (present view)

The first known ancestor of José María was Pedro Ampuero Ajo, who in 1704 integrated numerous possessions in Asturias into one mayorazgo. One branch of the Ampueros settled in Biscay, grew to major landholders, inter-married with other prestigious families, and were already known as “notoria familia vizcaína”. The paternal grandfather of José María, Pedro María Ampuero Musaurieta, in the 1810s served as the first constitutional alcalde of Bilbao. He married his cousin from the Durango-based Maguna family; its representatives commanded tercios in Flanders, one was the founder of Montevideo and another served as governor of Buenos Aires. Durango became the family nest of the branch, centred upon the mansion known as Eche Zuria Palace. Apart from rural landholdings, the principal source of family wealth, the father of José María, José Joaquín Ampuero Maguna, constructed and owned numerous buildings in Bilbao and surroundings. In the 1820s and the 1830s he held various municipal and provincial posts, e.g. serving in the Bilbao ayuntamiento or as the Biscay regidor.

Ampuero Maguna married Genara Jáuregui Elguezabal, descendant to a prestigious Bilbao family; the couple had 5 children, born between 1829 and 1840. José María was the second one in sequence and the only son who survived early childhood. Close to nothing is known of his early years, except that he was growing up in wealth and as the only male heir of the family; according to hagiographic obituary notes, living mostly at the Eche Zuria estate since youth he demonstrated vivid interest in the history of his family, Durango, Biscay and Vascongadas. None of the sources consulted provide any information on his education and it is not clear whether, and if yes where and when he pursued an academic career. Sporadically he was later referred in the press as “distinguido abogado”, which might suggest his law studies, probably in the late 1850s. In the early 1860s he resided in Durango, aspiring to public posts and taking over the family economy.

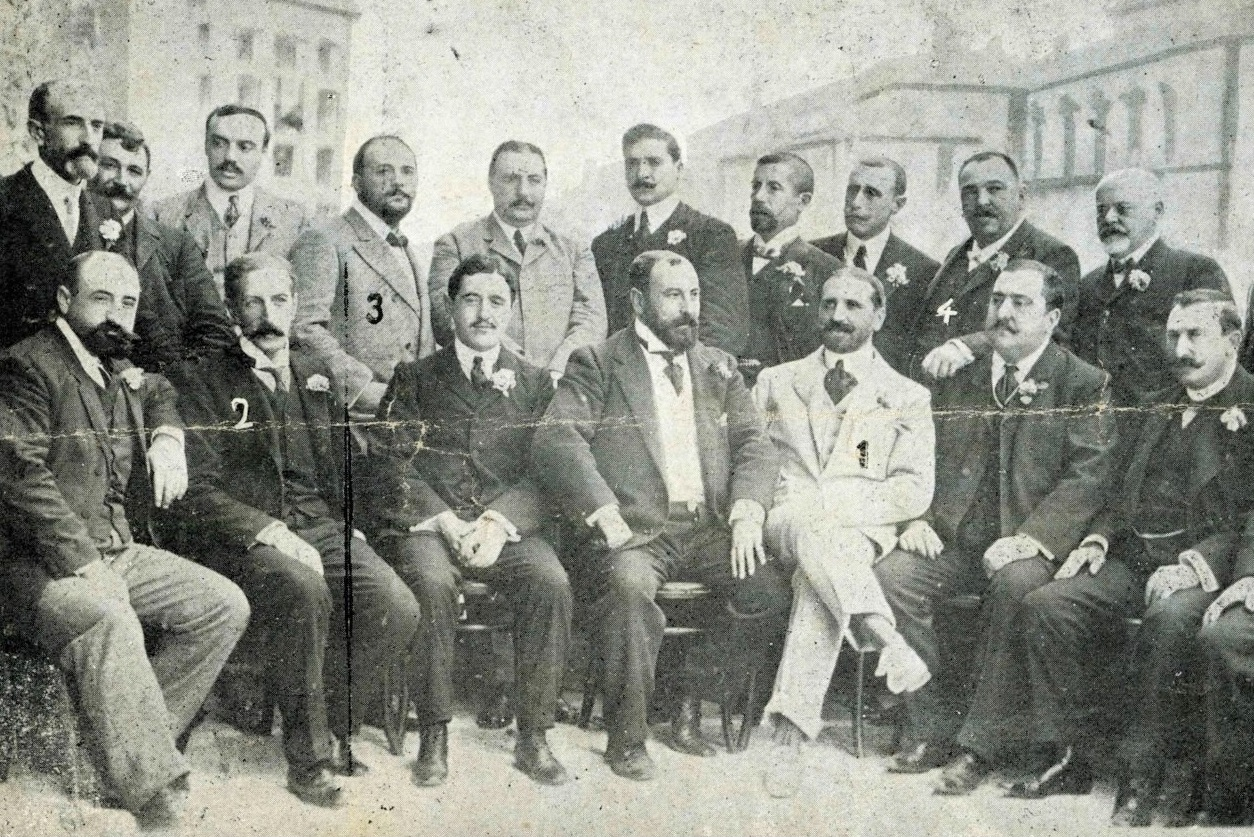
José Joaquín Ampuero y del Río

In 1870 Ampuero married María Milagro del Río y Aguero, the native of Madrid though related also to Burgos. The couple settled in the family residence in Durango; they had 7 children, born in the 1870s and 1880s. María del Carmen died in infancy and Antonio in his youth. José Joaquín succeeded his father in politics; as a Traditionalist in the 1910s and 1920s he served in the Biscay diputación, in the Congress and in the Senate, becoming also the local business tycoon. María de la Soledad married a Carlist politician, deputy mayor of Bilbao and senator Manuel Lezama Leguizamón. Most of Ampuero's grandchildren engaged in business and held executive posts in various companies, though the best known one, Casilda Ampuero Gandarias, married general José Enrique Varela and supposedly influenced him towards Carlism. Her daughter and the great-granddaughter to Ampuero Jáuregui, Casilda Varela Ampuero, married a guitar virtuoso, Paco de Lucía. Some of Ampuero's great-great-grandchildren are known as business moguls and at times attract media attention.

== Access to Carlism ==
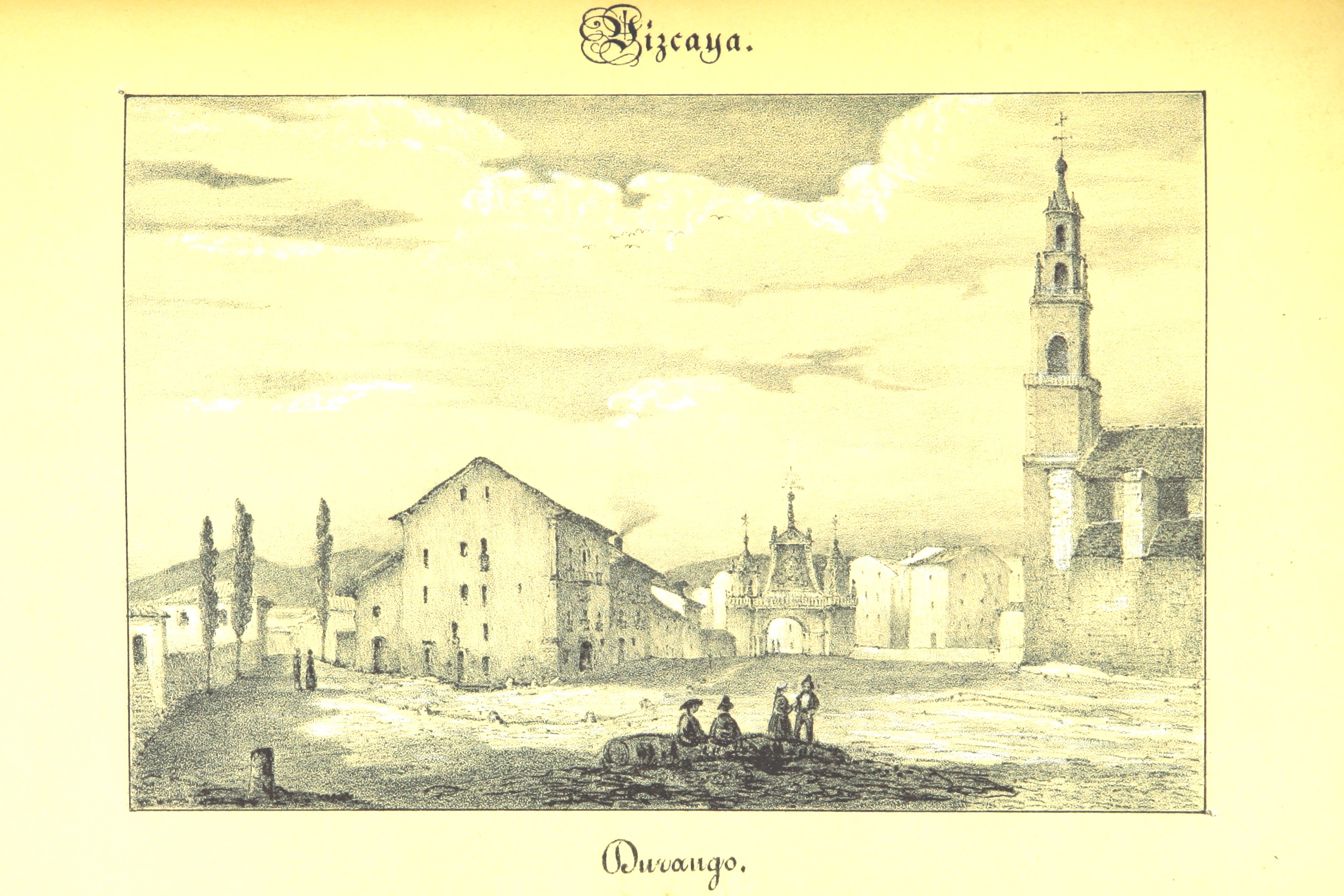
Durango (mid-19th century)

None of Ampuero's ancestors was known for traditionalist political preferences and most sided rather with the emergent Spanish liberalism. His paternal grandfather was alcalde of Bilbao as defined by the new, constitutional regime, and his father sided with the Cristinos during the First Carlist War, serving on various posts in the city besieged by the Carlists. However, later on the family moved towards more moderate, fuerista positions; disappointed by the curtailment of Biscay autonomous establishments in the 1840s, they were involved in conspiracy against centralizing policy of Espartero. It is known that José María was from his youth attached to provincial fueros. In his late 20s and taking advantage of the prestige of his father and other relatives, José María started to aspire to public posts. In 1864 he was appointed to the Biscay diputación foral as regidor electo from the so-called Bando Gamboino, a historical-geographical unit that the county of Durango formed part of; as such he entered Gobierno del señorio de Vizcaya, a provincial self-government. Ampuero's term expired in 1866 and it is not clear whether he was re-elected for the following one of 1866–1868. He received the same mandate for the years of 1868-1870 and was re-elected – still as representative of Durango - for the period of 1872–1874.

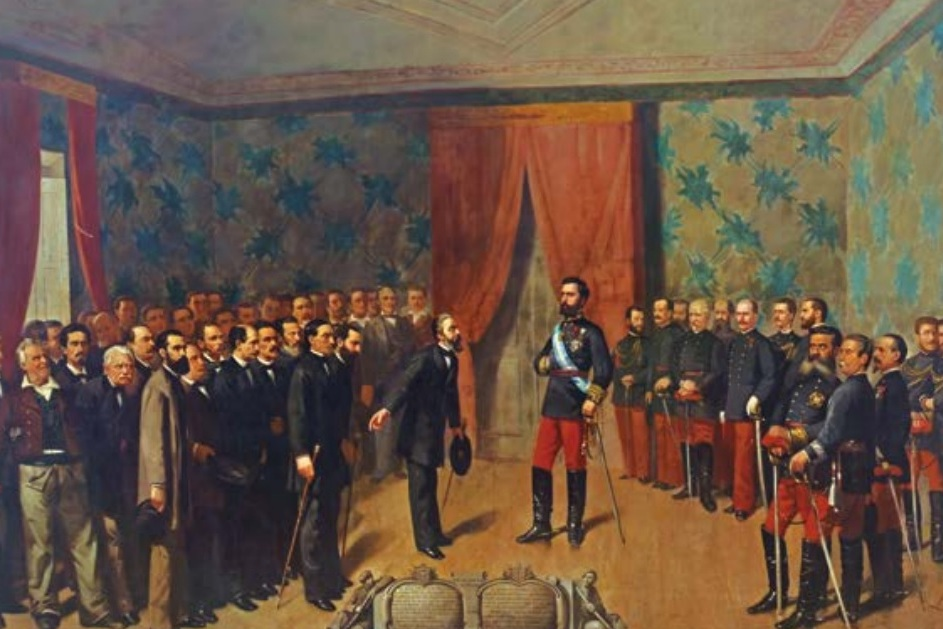
Junta de Merindades offering their support to Carlos VII, 1874

Following the outbreak of the Third Carlist War, in 1873-1874 most of Biscay was overrun by the legitmist troops and the Carlists set up their own administration. The provincial self-government, its powers limited mostly to the besieged Bilbao, remained loyal to the Madrid government. However, most Biscay counties constituted a so-called Junta de Merindades de Vizcaya, a body which posed as an assembly grouping traditional Biscay territorial units; it claimed power in the province and effectively rejected the authority of diputación. Ampuero entered the Junta as representative of the Durango county. In hope to get the traditional fueros, abolished during the Isabelline period, reinstated, in May 1874 the Junta adopted an openly rebellious stand and offered its support to the Carlist claimant, Carlos VII. Ampuero was nominated to a section named Junta de Agravios; its role was to inspect appeals against draft to the Carlist army. He also engaged personally and offered the claimant hospitality at the family estate; the proposal was accepted and Ampuero actually hosted the Carlist king in Durango during an unspecified period. However, at least theoretically, Ampuero was still forming part of the Biscay diputación foral; he was listed as its diputado by the Madrid Guía oficial de España for the years of 1875 and 1876.

== Early post-war engagements ==
Carlist standard

It is not clear whether Ampuero suffered any governmental repression following the ultimate Carlist defeat; none of the sources consulted confirms any. He did not abandon his earlier declaration and in the late 1870s allegedly he remained faithful to the claimant; however, as the movement was in total disarray and there was hardly any Carlist organization operational in Vascongadas, his loyalty to Carlos VII did not translate to any action. This changed in 1880, when Ampuero decided to stand as a candidate for the Biscay diputación from Durango; thanks to the position of his family, but also thanks to Traditionalist strength in the county, he was elected and unsuccessfully coveted the post of the president. His term came to an end the following year when he obtained the Cortes ticket. As the Carlists officially did not field party candidates, during the 1881 electoral campaign for the lower chamber of the parliament he competed as an individual in Durango and emerged victorious. His first act when confirmed was sending homage letters to the Pope and Carlos VII; the latter replied, declaring Ampuero and Ortiz de Zárate “unicos representantes en la Cámara de nuestra gran Comunión”. As a member of a minuscule, unofficial 2-member Carlist minority, Ampuero had little chance to influence the country politics; he was recorded when defending Catholic rights, speaking against attempts to curtail prerogatives of the Biscay self-government and advocating decentralisation of public administration before his term expired in 1884.

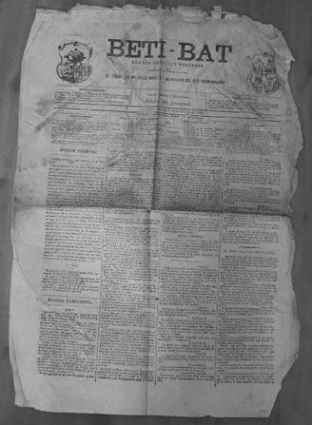
Beti-bat (1882)

An ardent supporter of separate Biscay foral establishments, Ampuero was also an enthusiast of Basque culture; himself he spoke and wrote Basque with pleasure and frequently preferred to use euskara rather than castellano. As part of his electoral campaign, though also as his private campaign to promote both Basque and foral rights, in 1881 and together with Gustavo Cobreros he co-founded a Bilbao-based periodical, Beti-bat (eng. "never changing"). From the onset it suffered financial problems and has never gone beyond 500 subscribers; highly flavored with traditionalist outlook, Beti-bat suffered also because of internal divisions within the movement and ceased to exist in the mid-1880s. At the time Ampuero launched another Basque initiative; 1885 marked the inauguration of Fiestas Euskaras, a Durango-based annual multi-cultural event which followed the pattern of juegos florales. Highly influenced by early vascologist initiatives of Antoine d'Abbadie and his own distant relative Vicente Araña, Ampuero officially appeared as president of “Comisión de las Fiestas Euskaras” and formatted the event as competition in categories such as literature, music and paintings, all related to Basque culture; in 1885 there were 28 different contributions presented. Fiestas were re-staged in 1886 and irregularly also later on. Ampuero was reportedly nominated himself for a prize related to his Cartilla del agricultor vascongado, which he reportedly declined out of modesty.

== Integrist crisis ==
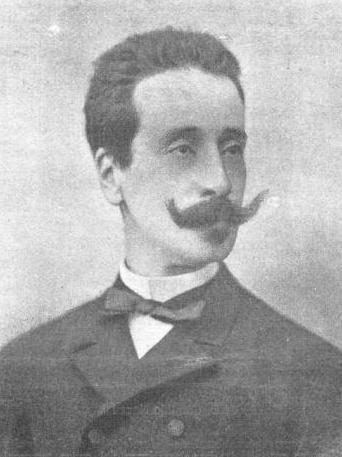
Ramon Nocedal

In the early 1880s Carlism was increasingly plagued by the conflict between the claimant Carlos VII and his political representative in Spain, Cándido Nocedal. Ampuero's position was somewhat ambiguous. When in 1881 the king's trustee and aspiring leader marqués de Cerralbo suggested that Nocedal's personal jefatura be replaced with a collegial leadership, Ampuero seemed supportive, declaring utter loyalty to his king and quoting “exclusivismo de D. Cándido”. However, in the unfolding press war between titles which represented competitive currents Beti-Bat sided with the Nocedalista daily, El Siglo Futuro, and in 1883 Ampuero personally voiced against its major opponent, La Fé. Following the 1885 death of Candido Nocedal he co-signed a homage letter to his son Ramón, who at the time was widely expected to take over the party leadership; however, the claimant opted for an interim solution.

The unquestioned Carlist leader in Biscay, Ramón Ortiz de Zarate, died in 1883, and there was no dominant party personality in the province in the mid-1880, with Juan E. Orúe, Pedro M. Piñeira, Estanislao Jaime de Labayru, José de Acillona, José María de Orbe y Gaytán and Ampuero considered potential leaders. Following a string of changes in 1886 Valde-Espina, the trustee of Carlos VII and the party leader for the entire Vascongadas, offered the Biscay post to Ampuero. He declined; the official reason quoted was related to formalities, but historians speculate that Ampuero was overwhelmed by scale of internal conflict within the party. The post eventually went to Acillona, though shortly afterwards Ampuero refused even to accept the position of the county leader in Durango. The same year he was supposed to stand in the Cortes elections and there were plans of alliances made; again, he eventually declined. “Por motivos de delicateza” Ampuero refused even to host a meeting of provincial party leaders at his estate.

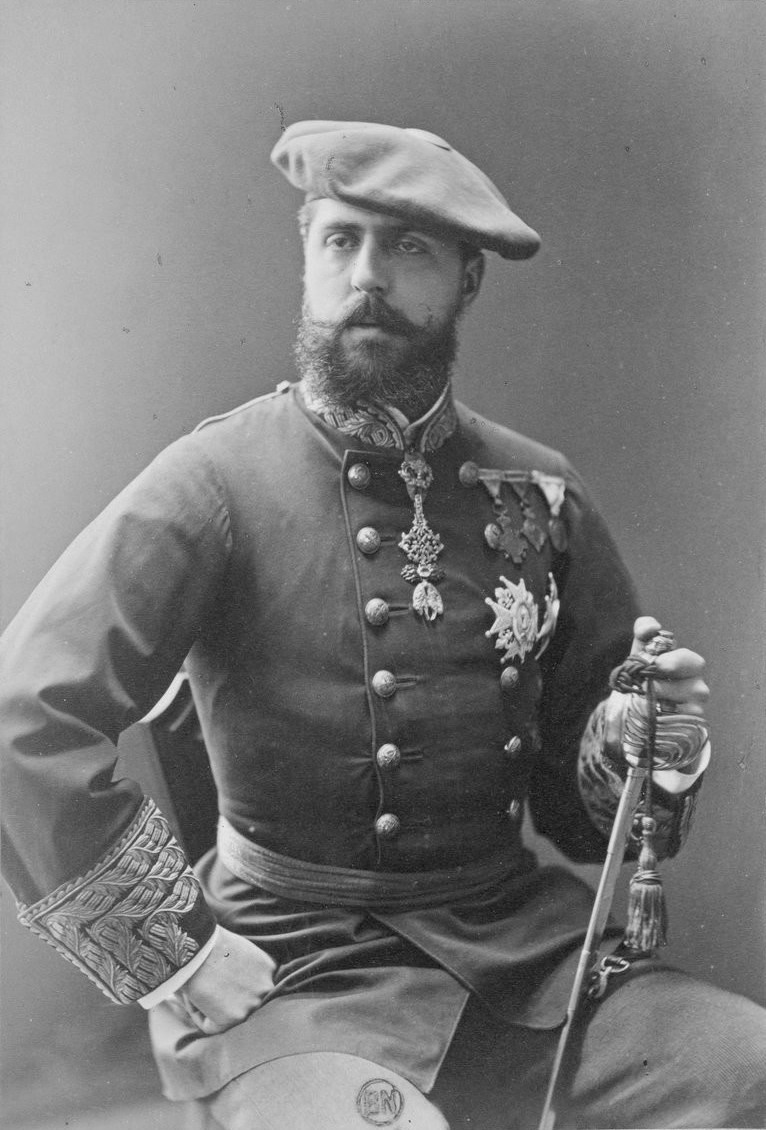
Carlos VII

The internal Carlist crisis erupted in 1888, when Nocedal was expulsed from the party and left to build his own organisation; the movement came to be known as Integrism. Though most rank-and-file militants remained loyal, in Vascongadas “almost all grand Carlist landholders in the province defected" and all periodicals joined the rebels. Ampuero, who few years earlier had been counted among “integros más destacados”, was widely expected to side with Nocedal. However, he opted for loyalty versus the claimant and together with José Niceto de Urquizu remained one of few recognizable figures who stood by Carlos VII. Following the breakup he emerged as a key Carlist personality in Biscay and as such featured on party rallies; e.g. in 1889 he appeared along with the new party leader de Cerralbo during a Guernica anniversary of Carlos VII taking the oath to defend Basque fueros. It is not clear whether he again refused the post of the party provincial jefe, which eventually went to Román de Zubiaga; at the turn of the decades Ampuero appeared merely as his deputy.

== 1890s: electoral and Basque campaigns ==
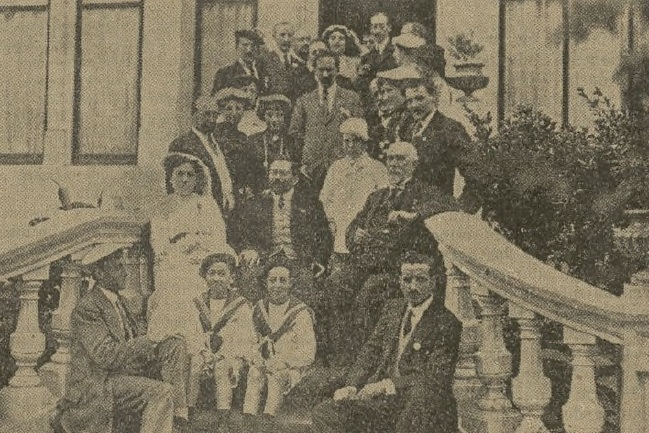
the Ampuero family and de Mella, Durango (later picture)

In 1889 Ampuero resumed his service in the Biscay diputación, elected from Durango. Little is known of his 2-year assignment, except that he engaged in legal dispute over internal composition of the body. Once his term expired and following some vacillation, in 1891 he tried his hand in general elections to the Cortes. He competed against a liberal candidate and lost marginally; according to present-day historians, he was “the only man of Biscay Carlism with sufficient economic capacity, prestige and personal influence which could have been elected in the only Biscay district where Carlist victory was imaginable”, but owed his defeat to internal divisions within Traditionalism. During the campaign of 1893 Ampuero again stood as the official Carlist candidate from Durango and lost again, this time decisively to a conservative rival. In 1896 the press reported that he was likely to run for the Senate from Bilbao, but there is no confirmation of him actually standing. In 1898 he lost his Senate bid, this time standing in Gipuzkoa. The last press speculation on Ampuero's Congress’ bid comes from 1905.

Ampuero did not take part in nationwide Carlist politics and is barely mentioned in historiographic works on the movement of the 1890s; occasionally the press noted his outbursts against the Integrists, who allegedly sinned against "Dios, Patria y Rey". However, he was barely missing during Traditionalism-flavored rallies in the province, e.g. in 1892 appearing along de Cerralbo in Guernica. The year 1895 marked his beginning of what was to become a longtime friendship with the rising star of Carlist politics, Juan Vázquez de Mella, whom Ampuero hosted in Biscay; similar news were repeated over time, e.g. in 1903; in a public letter of 1905 Ampuero hailed de Mella as his great friend. At the turn of the centuries he began to appear accompanied by his son José Joaquín, who started to aspire to public posts; in 1900 both were briefly detained as part of governmental precautionary measures related to suspected Carlist conspiracy and minor disturbances in Catalonia.

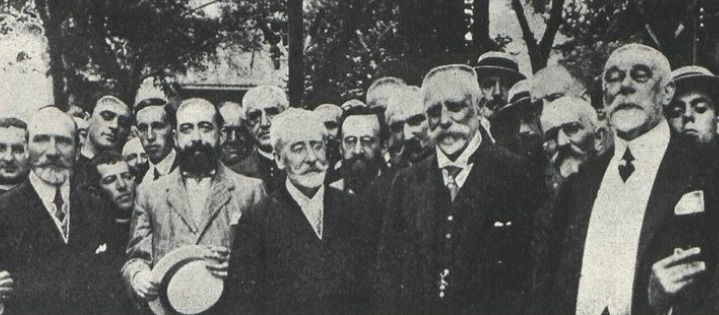
Ampuero, Feliu and other Carlist leaders during a rally to support Basque fueros, Guernica

Ampuero went on with his campaign to promote Basque culture. In 1888 in a periodical Euskal-Erria he published Aita Santu Leon XIII-garrenari, a homage address to the Pope; what made it exceptional was that the eulogy was written in euskara, at the time considered the language suitable for barns rather than for such highly aimed documents. In the early 1890s he co-organized new Basque festivals, like the one in Iurreta, and sponsored the existing ones; later on he was active in various commemorative committees, like the one to celebrate the anniversary of death of Pablo Astarloa. Some of these initiatives overlapped with his interest in agriculture and horticulture, considered part of the Basque identity. Apart from experimenting with various plants in his Piñondo gardens, in 1903 he published another manual designed for Basque farmers. In 1904 Ampuero entered Junta Consultiva de Agricultura de la Diputación de Bilbao and in 1906 as vice-president co-founded provincial Sindicato Agrícola.

== Senator ==
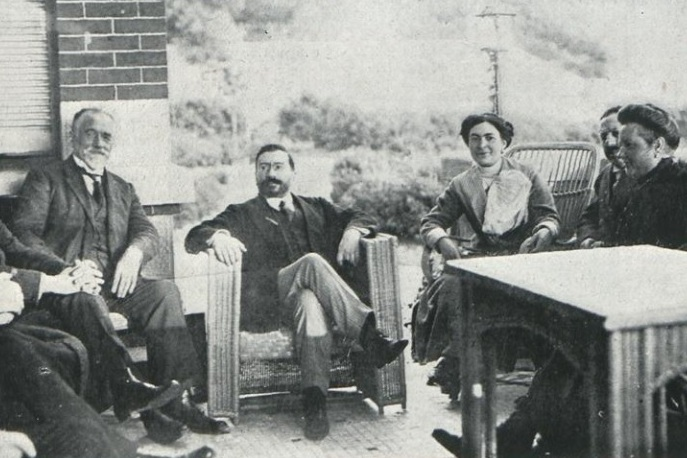
Ampuero with de Mella, 1911

In 1907 Ampuero re-launched his bid for the senate, though again not from Biscay but from the neighboring province of Gipuzkoa. As a Carlist representative he closed a deal with other right-wing candidates to form a so-called “candidatura católico-fuerista”, in the press dubbed as “candidatura carlo-integrista”. The alliance worked and Ampuero was comfortably elected, after 23-year-break resuming his service in the Spanish legislative. In 1910 and again as representative of Gipuzkoa he was re-elected for another term, which ensured his seat in the upper chamber of the Cortes until 1913; he formed a small, 4-member Traditionalist minority. In the senate he remained more active than 25 years earlier in the Congress and his official record documents numerous interpellations, interventions or questions; in the press he was noted mostly as promoter of rural syndicalism, e.g. when speaking in 1907, 1909 or 1911; when advocating interests of agrarian syndicates in the chamber he challenged mostly the Minister of Economy. Other threads visible in Ampuero's activity were championing Catholic rights against secular attempts of the government, mounting pro-fuerista initiatives with other Biscay deputies and senators, and promoting provincial railway network, the business he was personally interested in.

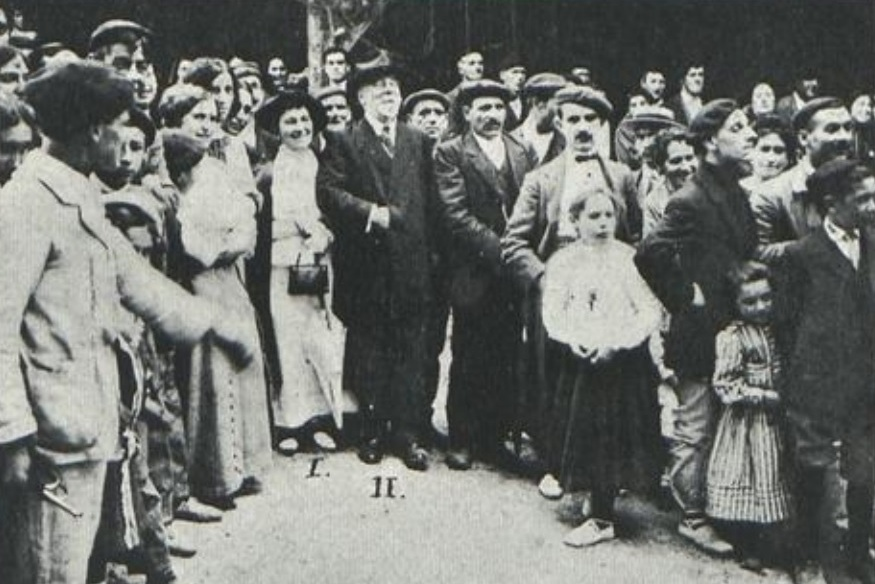
Ampuero (centre) and his daughter during a rally of Juventud Jaimista, Durango 1912

Apart from parliamentary activity Ampuero remained involved in Carlist propaganda, this time not limited to Biscay but focused also on Madrid. As a senator he used to take part in grand banquets grouping the party parliamentarians, visited headquarters of Carlist periodicals, attended central religious services formatted as homages to grand defunct Carlists, took part in rallies, e.g. the one in Bilbao aimed against secular schooling, hosted de Mella or participated in local religious ceremonies, e.g. in 1912 – by virtue of his Gipuzkoan representation - in Azpeitia. In 1909 together with his son he travelled to Italy to attend the funeral of Carlos VII. However, despite his status of a senator and the local Traditionalist personality, Ampuero did not hold leadership posts in the local organization; his taking part in the 1909 sitting of the provincial executive was exceptional. In the early 1910s he was noted as merely president of Circulo Jaimista de Durango, though during a public rally it was rather his daughter who took to the floor. His nomination to the national party executive came in 1912, when Ampuero took the seat in Junta Nacional not as a Biscay representative, but by virtue of his senate ticket. In 1913 he was appointed member of the Junta's section of Acción Social, but was not noted in the central party ruling board beyond this date. The same year Ampuero and his wife travelled to Pau, where they again met the new Carlist king, Jaime III.

== Last years: patriarch ==
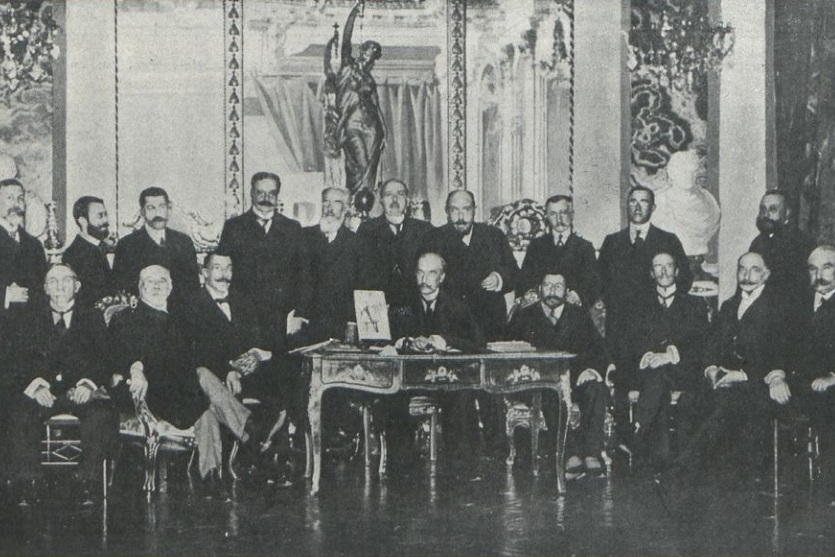
Ampuero and national Carlist leaders, 1910s

As nearly an octogenarian, in the mid-1910s Ampuero enjoyed the status of a Biscay Carlist patriarch and a provincial charismatic figure. Beyond the party ranks he was known as authority on agriculture and horticulture; his earlier manual was translated into Basque and while in his 70s he travelled as far as Valencia and Madrid to deliver lectures at agricultural conferences; proposed Gran Cruz del Mérito Agrícola, he reportedly refused it because of his modesty. Ampuero was also acknowledged as zealous supporter of the foral regime; as member of the so-called Casa de Juntas de Guernica, until shortly before death he used to take part in its sittings when advocating "reintegración foral". In recognition of his merits, in 1916 he was again elected from Durango to the Biscay diputación, though this time it took him a legal battle to prevail. The last news on his engagements comes from 1917, when he stood for Durango during a Biscay meeting of provincial county representatives.

During half a century Ampuero has partially re-oriented the family economy. When he took over it relied mostly on exploitation of the mountains with their chestnut and oak trees, agriculture, leases of farmhouses, mills or ironworks, and interests. When he handed over to his son, the family held stakes in Ferrocarril Central de Vizcaya de Bilbao a Durango, the company he co-founded in the 1880s and which he supervised as member of the board; he was also sitting in the executive of Banco de Bilbao, an insurance company La Polar and other firms. He turned one of his caserios into a small electric power plant. The official statement listing Ampuero's possessions contains 20 pages and lists numerous estates in Bilbao and surroundings; his descendants inherited at least 600 hectares of land.

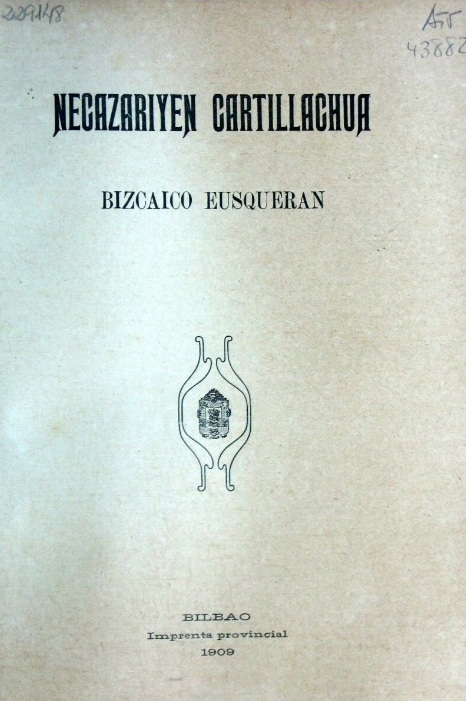
Ampuero's agricultural booklet in Basque

Ampuero's role in the history of Biscay, Vascongadas and Spain is not clear. Upon death a number of obituary notes hailed him as a great “regionalista”, who sacrificed his life for the cause of local fueros and declined a number of posts to pursue his ideas, though also as an expert on agriculture and a man who combined respect for tradition with implementation of new economic measures. Later his memory gradually went into oblivion, especially that it was eclipsed by activity of his son, José Joaquín Ampuero y del Río. A historiographic judgment from the 1980s was that though a genuine foralist, Ampuero remained “ante todo realista”, above all a politician attached to dynastic and monarchist values. He allegedly failed to re-define the Carlist political offer in Biscay, which in wake of emerging Basque nationalism and ongoing social change contributed to downturn of Traditionalism in the province. A spate of articles which appeared in 2017 on centenary of his death offered a different picture: his Carlism was downplayed, while Ampuero was presented as an “euskaltzale”, a lover of Basque culture who contributed to emergence of the Basque nation.

== See also ==
- Traditionalism
- Carlism
- José Joaquín Ampuero y del Río
