= Gaytán =

Gaytán or Gaytan is a variant of the more numerous Spanish surname Gaitán. Both are ultimately derived from, i.e. Hispanic versions of, the Italian masculine given name and surname Gaetano. Notable people with the surname include:

- Alberto Larios Gaytán, Mexican politician
- Ann Gaytan (born 1949), Belgian singer and poet
- Bibi Gaytán (born 1972), Mexican actress
- Carlos Gaytán (born 1970), Mexican chef
- Chacho Gaytán (born 1969), Mexican composer
- Daisy Hernández Gaytán (born 1983), Mexican politician
- Daniel Gaytán (born 1970), Mexican singer
- Eddy Gaytán (1929–1999), Argentinian-Cuban accordionist
- Hildebrando Gaytán Márquez (1945–2006), Mexican politician
- Itzel Gaytan (born 1992), Mexican volleyball player
- Jorge Cardiel Gaytán (1924–?), Mexican basketball player
- José María de Orbe y Gaytán (1848–1933), Spanish politician
- Pedro Gaytán (1518–1588), Spanish soldier and writer
- Porfirio Gaytán Gudiño (born 1966), Mexican politician
- Rocío García Gaytán (1959–2015), Mexican politician
- Sergio Gaytán Luján (born 1972), Mexican musician and political researcher

== See also ==
- Cajetan
- Gaetano
- Gaitán
