= Gaitán =

Gaitán also spelled "Gaytán" and "Gaitan" (From Latin: Caietanus, Arabic: جيتني Geaitani, Ancient Greek: Καίετανος Kaietanos, Modern Greek: Γαϊτάνος/Γαϊτάνης Gaitanos/Gaitanis meaning "who come from the cave/port" or who come from Gaeta, ancient Greek port of the Italian province of Lazio) is a common Spanish surname of Byzantine Greek-Latin Mediterranean origin. Notable people with the surname include:

- Alberto Gaitán (born 1974), Panamanian Musical Producer, Songwriter & Singer Gaitanes
- Fernando Gaitán (born 1960), Colombian TV series and telenovelas screenwriter and producer
- Jorge Eliécer Gaitán (1898–1948), Colombian politician
- Martín Gaitán (born 1978), Argentine rugby union footballer
- Nicolás Gaitán (born 1988), Argentine football player
- Ricardo Gaitán (born 1971), Panamanian Musical Producer, Songwriter & Singer Gaitanes
- Walter Gaitán (born 1977), Argentine football player
- Yanina Gaitán (born 1978), Argentine footballer
- Jef Gaitan (born 1986), Philippine Actress
- Nick Gaitan (born 1979)Mexican-American Musician, Bassist, Singer-Songwriter

== See also ==
- Gaytán
