= Evelyn Ampuero =

Peruvian volleyball player (born 1987)

Personal information
- Full name: Evelyn Andrea Ampuero
- Nationality: Peruvian
- Born: 27 December 1987 (age 38)
- Height: 171 cm (67 in)
- Weight: 65 kg (143 lb)

National team
2005	Peru

Evelyn Andrea Ampuero (born 27 December 1987) is a Peruvian female volleyball player. She was part of the Peru women's national volleyball team.

She won the gold medal at the 2005 Bolivarian Games. She participated in the 2006 FIVB Volleyball Women's World Championship.
