= José María de Orbe y Gaytán =

Spanish Carlist soldier & politician (1848-1933)

José M. de Orbe y Gaytán
- Born: José María de Orbe y Gaytán de Ayala; 1848; Vergara
- Died: 1933 (aged 84–85); Astigarraga
- Occupation: landowner
- Known for: politician
- Political party: Carlism

José María de Orbe y Gaytán de Ayala, 5th Marquess of Valde-Espina, 1st Viscount of Orbe (1848–1933) was a Spanish Carlist soldier and politician. His career climaxed during presidency of the provincial Gipuzkoan self-government in the 1910s, though he is known mostly as member of the iconic Basque Valde-Espina dynasty. In the party ranks he rose to provincial leader in Gipuzkoa and was briefly member of the national Carlist executive.

== Family and youth ==
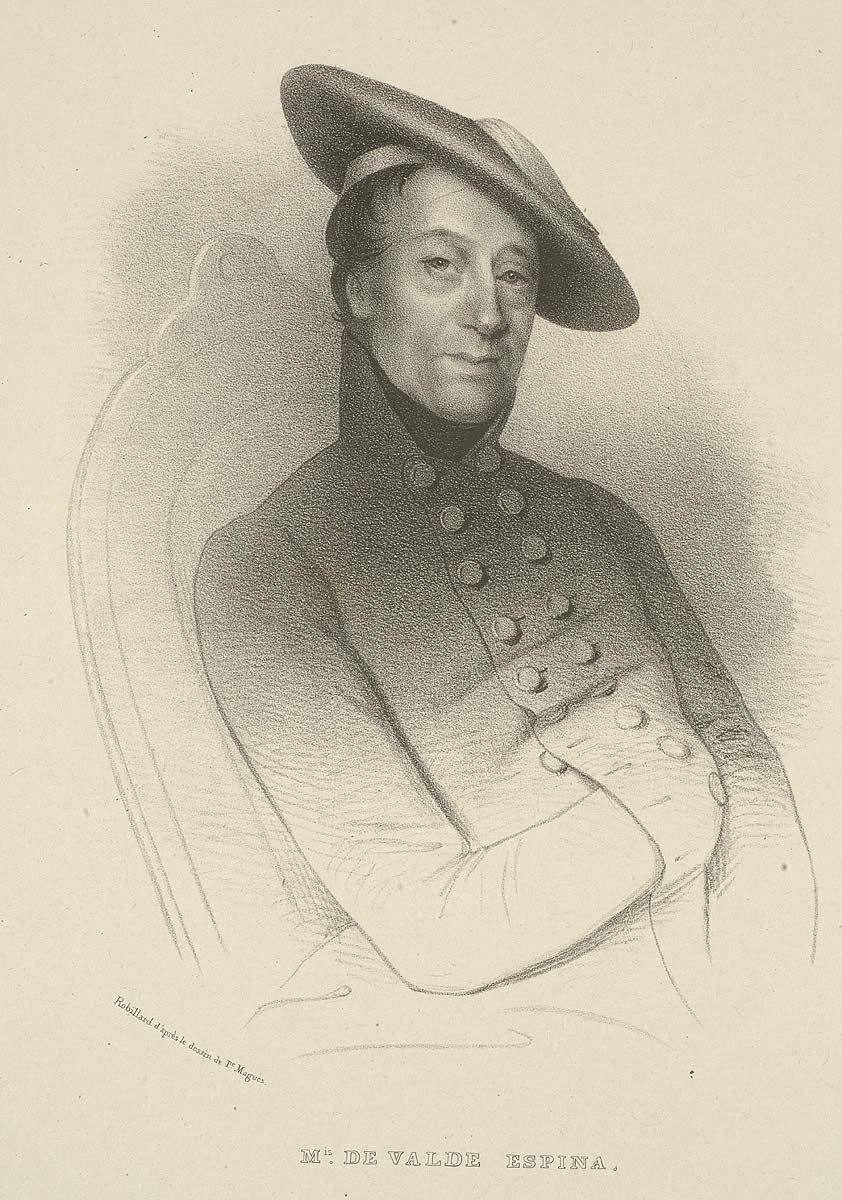
grandfather (note arm prosthesis)

José María was descendant to a Basque aristocratic lineage. The Orbes originated from a Gipuzkoan hamlet of Anguiozar; in the 17th century their centre shifted to the nearby Biscay Ermua. The family rose to prestige in the mid-18th century, following completion of a palace, awarding Andrés de Orbe y Zarauz with marquesado of Valde-Espina, and intermarriage with a Murguía y Arbelaiz dynasty; the latter multiplied family wealth by estates in eastern Gipuzkoa, centred around a mansion of Astigarraga. An heir to the fortune, which in the early 19th century comprised 30 estates in Biscay and an unspecified number in Gipuzkoa, was the 3rd marqués and the grandfather of José María, José María de Orbe y Elío (1776–1850). He lost his arm during the War of the Pyrenees and gained his name during the Peninsular War; opposition to the 1812 Cadiz constitution cost him imprisonment and nearly execution. A general brigadier, during the First Carlist War he joined the legitimists and served as minister of war; he died on exile in Bordeaux.

The son of Orbe y Elío and the 4th marqués, Juan Nepomuceno de Orbe y Mariaca (1819–1891), during the First Carlist War fought under command of his father and was twice wounded. In 1848 and 1860 he took part in subsequent conspiracy attempts, briefly serving as a senator. During the Third Carlist War he was Jefe de Estado Mayor del Ejército del Norte, held admin positions and commanded in line, including personally leading cavalry charges. Following brief exile in France he returned to Spain, among Vasconagadas Carlists already an iconic figure. He married Casilda Gaytan de Ayala y Areizaga (1824–1881), descendant to another Gipuzkoan aristocratic dynasty. The couple shared their time between family residences in Ermua and Astigarraga; they had a pair of children, José María born as the older of two sons.

daughter getting married

Following his early homeschooling, some time in the late 1850s José María entered the Jesuit Tivoli college in Bordeaux. He spend there at least few years; due to unspecified family reasons he moved to an unidentified school in Pamplona, where in the mid-1860s he obtained the baccalaureat. Some sources claim he attended also Real Seminario de Nobles de Vergara and an institution in Madrid. José María married a Valenciana, María Vives de Cañamas (1853-1910), daughter of 18. Conde de Almenara (1814–1883). The couple had 7 children, born between 1879 and 1894; none of them became a public figure. The heir and the 6th marqués, Ignacio de Orbe y Vives Cañamas, was moderately active in the Carlist realm and grew to member of the Vascongadas party executive in the 1960s. Perhaps the best known of José María's descendants is his great-grandson and the 7th marqués, José María de Orbe y Klingenberg, a filmmaker; most of his movies, usually set in the Catalan ambience, do not relate to ancestral records; the last one, however, is partially shot in the Astigarraga palace and contains veiled references to the family history.

== Conspiracy and war (1868–1876) ==
teniente de Orbe

Given the Carlist record of his paternal grandfather and (until the 1860s) of his father, José María seemed poised to follow suit and to adhere to the legitimist cause. Together with his parent and his younger brother in 1868 he moved to France to mount another insurgency. As part of the job he returned to Spain shortly afterwards; engaged in La Escodada, a failed attempt to stage a rising in Navarre, he fled back to France in 1870. In 1872 as cavalry lieutenant he joined insurgency in Gipuzkoa; his first engagement was on May 14, when Carlist units were already in retreat, during the skirmishes at Mañaria. During the clashes at Oñate two days later Orbe's horse was hit twice, but he finally made it to France later that month.

In early 1873 Orbe entered Spain for the third time, assigned to units commanded by his father which having conquered southern Gipuzkoa advanced towards Biscay. On March 3 he took part in engagements at Marquina-Echevarria and later advanced to Guernica. In April his cavalry unit was shuttled across Gipuzkoa and Álava to Navarre, recording sweeping operations at Oñate, Azcárate and San Vicente-Peñacerrada before fighting at Eraul on May 5. The following phase consisted of commanding a column controlling Valle Baztan; in July 1873 he welcomed Carlos VII back in Spain at Zugarramurdi. Made adjutant general of the claimant, during the summer Orbe took part in operations which ensured Carlist takeover of central Navarre, engaged at Ibero, Las Campanas, Estella, Allo, Dicastillo and the siege of Viana. Successfully repelling governmental counter-offensive in early November near Montejurra, in early 1874 he was transferred back to Biscay and took part in the siege of Bilbao. In March he was assigned a prestigious task of handling the iconic Carlist war standard, La Generalísima, before it was adopted by personal squadron of the claimant. Soon afterwards Orbe took part in rout of enemy troops at Somorrostro.

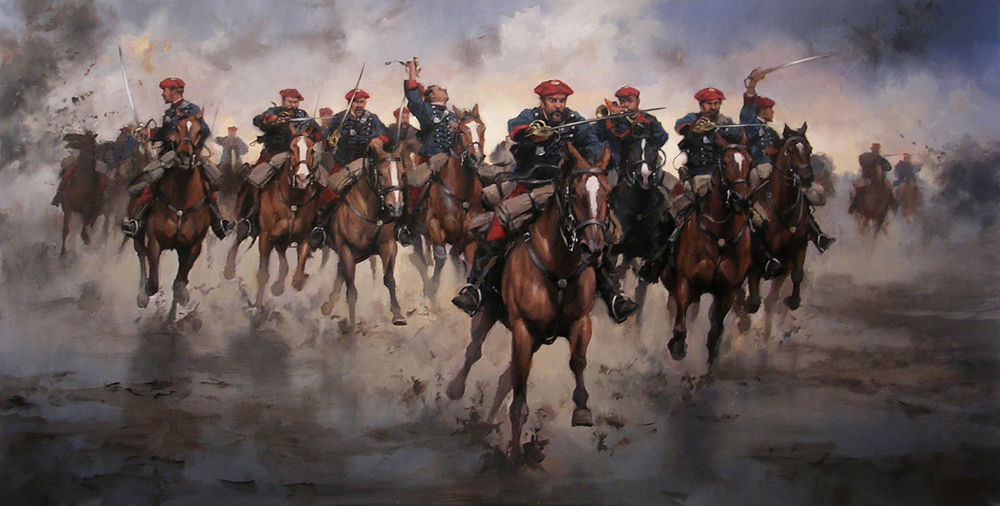
Carlist cavalry charging

Promoted to capitán and decorated, in the spring of 1874 Orbe was to organize the journey of his queen from Pau to the Carlist capital of Estella. He designed the plan which involved travelling by train, by coach and accompanying camouflage activities, intended to deceive the French; it all worked out and in the summer via Dancharinea Doña Margarita made it to Estella. During the fall of 1874 he was assigned to combat operations in Gipuzkoa, mostly boiling down to failed sieges of Irún and Guetaria. Back in Navarre in early 1875, he took part in the February battle of Lacár. Promoted to comandante and decorated again in the summer of 1875 he accompanied Carlos VII during Jura de Los Fueros in Guernica. From that moment Orbe stayed within his personal escort and is not noted as engaged in frontline combat. Accompanying the claimant to the French frontier, in February 1876 he was promoted to lieutenant colonel and awarded with vizcondado, In Valcarlos Orbe crossed the border bridge with the claimant and decided to join him into exile.

== In the shadow of own father (1876–1891) ==
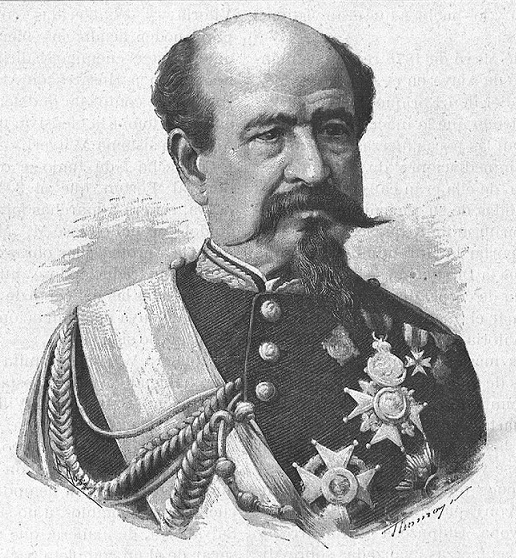
Juan N. Orbe Mariaca

Orbe accompanied his king to Bordeaux and then to London. Carlos VII apparently enjoyed his company and wanted Orbe to join him on the voyage to America, but the adjutant asked for the permission to excuse himself; he planned to get married. Granted authorization he indeed wed and settled in Saint-Jean-de-Luz, throughout 1877 his public activity reduced to sending letters of adhesion to various Traditionalist initiatives. It is not clear when he returned to Spain; his first child was born in 1879 already in Ermua. His father is reported as settling back in 1880, immediately assuming key position of Carlist "advanced sentry" in the Vascongadas. As Orbe was hardly known for anything else than his wartime deeds, prestigious parentage and newspaper-published letters, he was banking on popularity of his father when running in local elections to the Biscay diputación from Durango in 1883. Apparently successful at the polls, he got his ticket cancelled on legal grounds.

At the time Carlist structures in Vascongadas were in disarray; reconstruction proceeded with visible difficulty. Due to lack of recognized personalities and scarce interest of the others, in 1884 Orbe was considered a candidate to head the entire Biscay organization, but the plan was eventually abandoned. Similarly, in 1886 he was supposed to assume leadership of the Marquina district, again to no avail. At that time his father, who formally emerged as the Carlist leader for the entire Vascongadas, was still struggling to re-build appropriate organization; in wake of petty conflicts in its Biscay branch, controlled by José de Acillona, in 1886 Orbe was again asked to become emergency candidate to diputación, this time from Guernica. Following apparently successful campaign, he was again ruled out. The year of 1887 was dedicated mostly to accompanying Carlos VII during his another voyage to America; exact details are not clear and it is not known whether Orbe was with his king in Haiti, Barbados, Jamaica, Panama, Chile, Uruguay and Brazil; he was recorded at least in Buenos Aires.

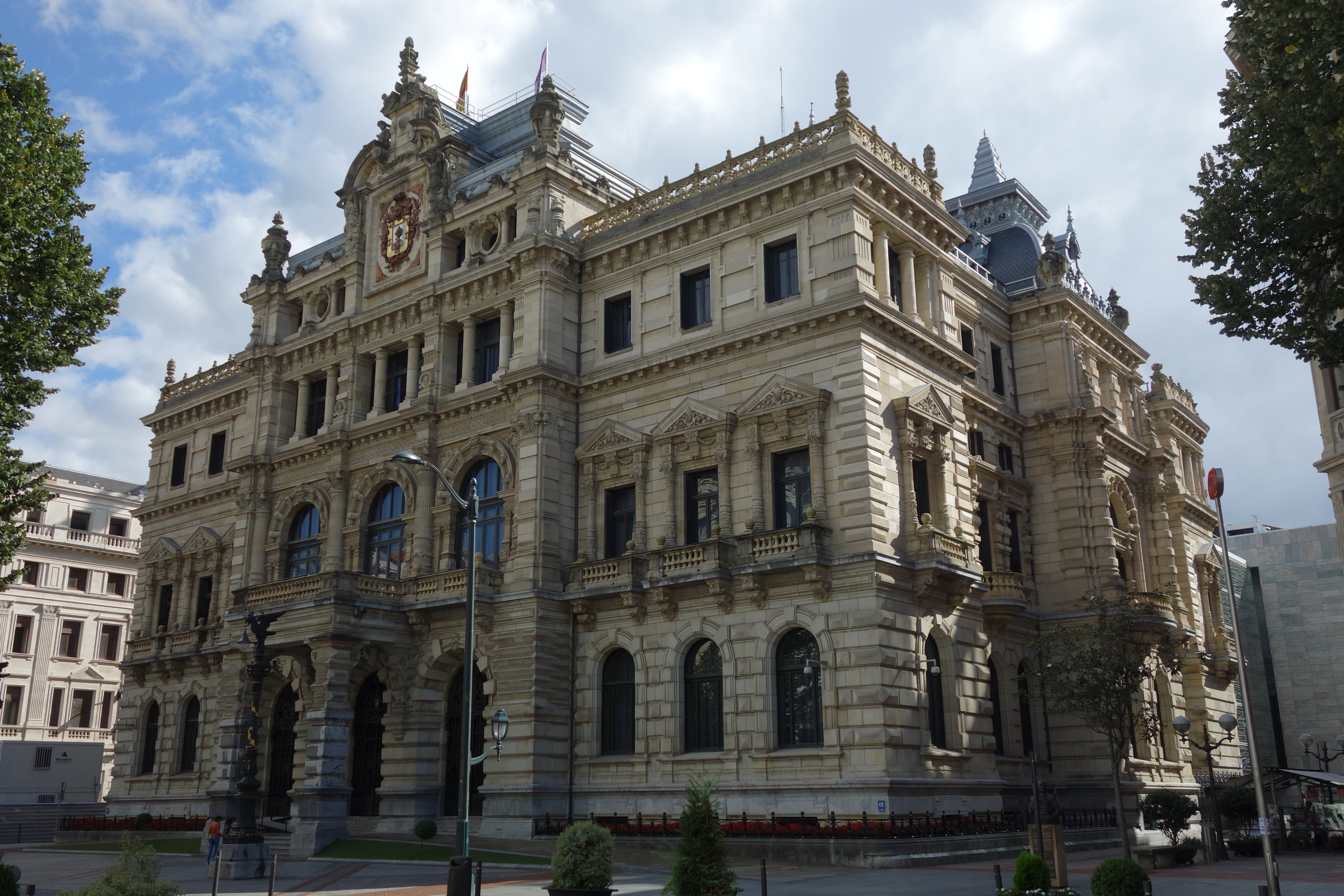
Biscay Diputacion HQ, Bilbao

In the 1880s Carlism was increasingly divided between supporters of the Nocedals and supporters of the claimant. The Orbe family clearly sided with the latter; when Circulo Católico Vascongado, a network serving as Biscay Carlist front organization, was increasingly taken over by the Nocedalistas, their opponents launched a competitive Sociedad Tradicionalista. In 1887 Orbe entered its Biscay Junta Directiva and following the 1888 Integrist breakup continued to work towards recovery of loyalist structures; within its ranks he rose to jefe of the Marquina district, though its organization remained largely on paper. His third attempt to run for the provincial self-government proved successful; elected from Guernica, in 1889-1890 he served as member of Diputación Provincial de Vizcaya, finally acquiring a recognized political standing. His emergence from the shadow of own father was confirmed when in 1891 he succeeded him as alcalde of Ermua; finally, following death of already iconic parent, José María was confirmed as the 5th marqués de Valde-Espina in 1892.

== Back row (1891–1904) ==
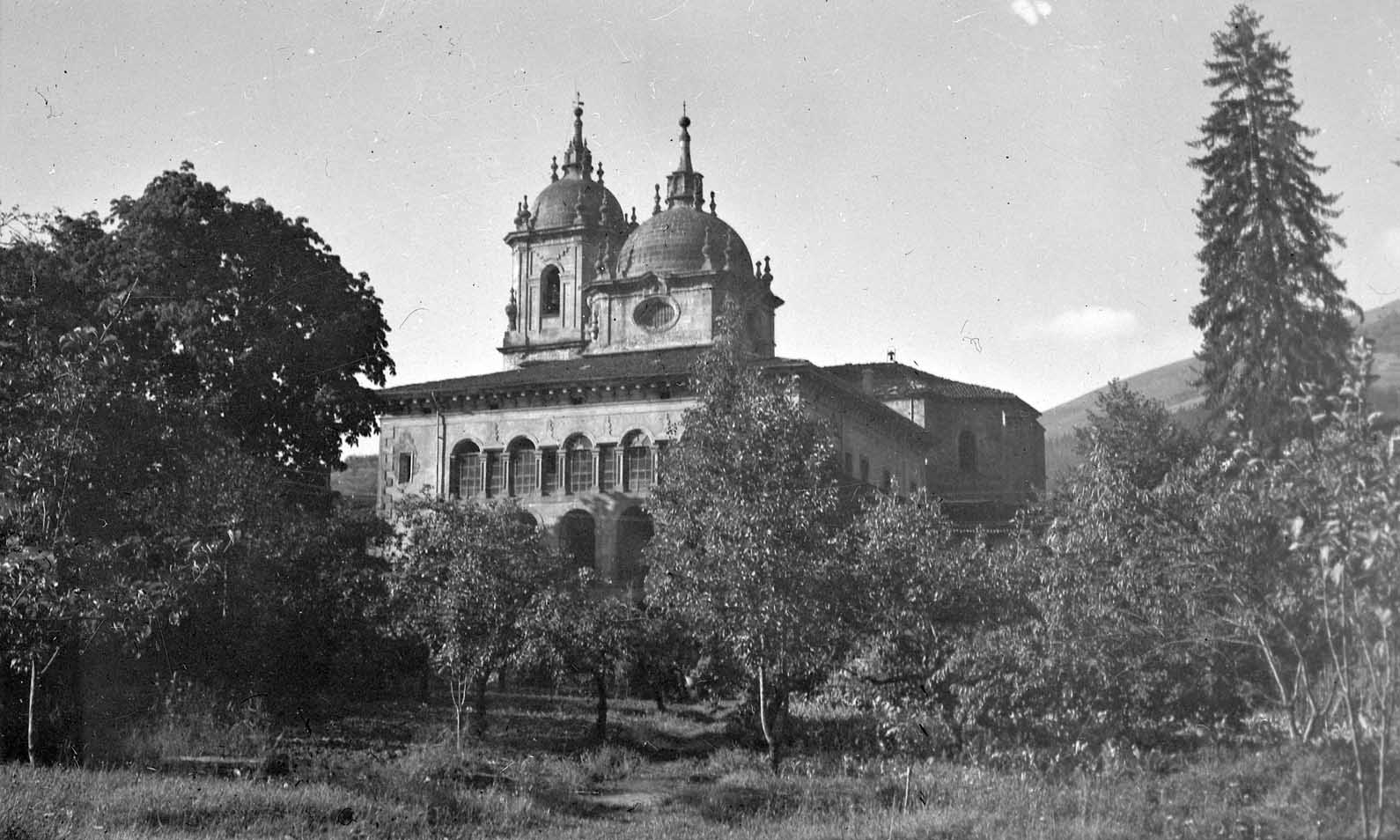
Palacio Valdespina, Ermua

When assisting his father in the 1880s Orbe remained in touch with issues of Carlist politics be it on the regional Vascongadas level or even nationwide; this changed since 1891. With Tirso Olazábal appointed provincial Gipuzkoan leader, Pedro M. Piñera y Orue the Biscay one and Salvadór Elio y Ezpeleta made regional Vascongadas leader, the new marqués de Valde-Espina became somewhat detached from great party politics. As his Biscay Diputación Provincial term expired he did not hold public assignments either, though it is not clear when he ceased as alcalde of Ermua. In the 1892-1895 period his political activities were reduced to attending party meetings, signing public letters, fathering official statements, occasionally speaking at local gatherings and presiding over formal banquets; though not standing in elections, he contributed to Carlist electoral efforts organisationwise. At that time he seemed involved in both Biscay and Gipuzkoan issues, though possibly tilted towards the former; in the mid-1890s he was reported as mounting various alliances to provincial disputation, especially in the Marquina district.

By the end of the decade it might have seemed that his younger brother, Candido de Orbe y Gaytán, assumed a more energetic role in politics; also active during Carlist feasts, he was recorded as giving official press statements explaining the party stand, grew to jefé of the San Sebastián branch and was heavily involved in mounting a provincial electoral alliance with the Integrists, the one which ended a decade of virulent hostility and commenced rapprochement between two branches of Traditionalism nationwide. Valde-Espina himself remained somewhat in the back row; in 1898 he was rumored to run for Cortes, but the news proved false. Nothing is known about his stance on Carlist preparations to another insurgency during 1898-1900, except that his house in Astigarraga was raided by the police and briefly occupied; following La Octubrada he supervised forced closing of Carlist circulos in Gipuzkoa.

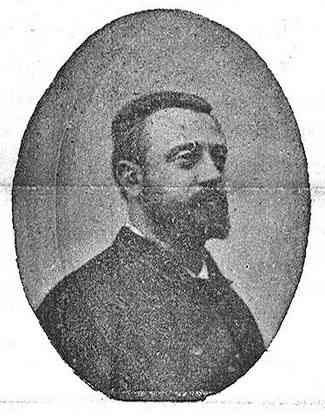
Valde-Espina in his 50s

In the early 1900s Valde-Espina kept limiting his activity to the Vascongadas and is not reported as engaged in great party politics nationwide. Unlike his father never particularly close to the deposed former Carlist leader marquis of Cerralbo, he was neither in political entourage of his successor, Matías Barrio y Míer; on the other hand, invariably he remained on excellent terms with the claimant and on good ones with the Gipuzkoan provincial leader Olazábal. Actually it seems that at that time his focus shifted away from Biscay to Gipuzkoa, as he lived mostly in Astigarraga (becoming its alcalde) and the Ermua palace stayed empty. Also historians suggest that his role, typical for many Carlist aristocratic leaders in the Vascongadas and consisting of mobilizing rural masses for the cause, territorially was applicable mostly to Gipuzkoa and only to a far lesser extent to Biscay, where Carlist influence was already shrinking dramatically.

== Towards the party executive (1904–1911) ==
Candido de Orbe

In 1904 a number of provincial politicians from centre-right parties set up Liga Foral Autonomista, an alliance focused on re-introduction of separate legal Gipuzkoan establishments. Candido de Orbe became vice-president and later also president of the body. Valde-Espina adhered to the initiative as an official Carlist representative; he co-signed its manifesto, entered its Managing Council and engaged in engineering a common electoral campaign. However, the Carlist executive grew suspicious of apparent Integrist domination in the alliance and Valde-Espina was made to resign from the executive; he remained in Liga as its rank and file activist representing himself only and declared that "every good vascongado" should keep supporting it. The issue gave rise to speculations about "decomposición del carlismo oficial" in Gipuzkoa, but they proved exaggerated. Valde-Espina remained active in the Liga until 1906, when it disintegrated.

Despite a controversial issue of his Liga membership, Valde-Espina's career in the party picked up the pace; in 1907 he succeeded own brother as leader of the Carlist structures in San Sebastián, in 1908 he replaced Tirso Olazábal as jefé in Gipuzkoa and in 1909 as provincial leader by default he entered the national executive, Junta Central. His public presence became more visible, as he featured prominently during grand Carlist assemblies in Somorrostro and Zumarraga. Though he had always been inclined towards conciliatory stand versus the Integrists, the new party leader Bartolomé Feliú made him apply harsh measures against those who went off limits in terms of electoral alliances, resulting in expulsion of Víctor Pradera from the party. Still in 1910 he participated financially in Sociedad Española de Edificaciones y Publicidad and entered its Consejo de Administración. The freshly set up publishing house was to support Carlist and allied periodicals and publications; he remained in the council for years to come.

Carlist standard

Around 1910 the Catholic public opinion was greatly agitated about the so-called Ley del Candado, Liberal regulations promoted by the Canalejas government and advancing tough policy versus the Church. Valde-Espina represented the Carlists in a number of organizations set up to block the legislation, like Junta del País Vasconavarro, Junta de Defensa Católica de Vizcaya and others. Due to more aggressive stand in the public realm he had to suffer admin measures against himself too; following his press statement, deemed incompatible with the rules of public order, in 1910 he was suspended as alcalde of Astigarraga, the job he held since the early 1900. The same year his activity got attention of the Cortes, which demanded explanation about propaganda initiatives featuring the new Carlist king, Don Jaime. In line with the family tradition, at that time he was also introducing a new Orbe generation into Carlist politics, as his oldest son Ignacio started to appear on various meetings.

== Gipuzkoan patricio (1911–1922) ==
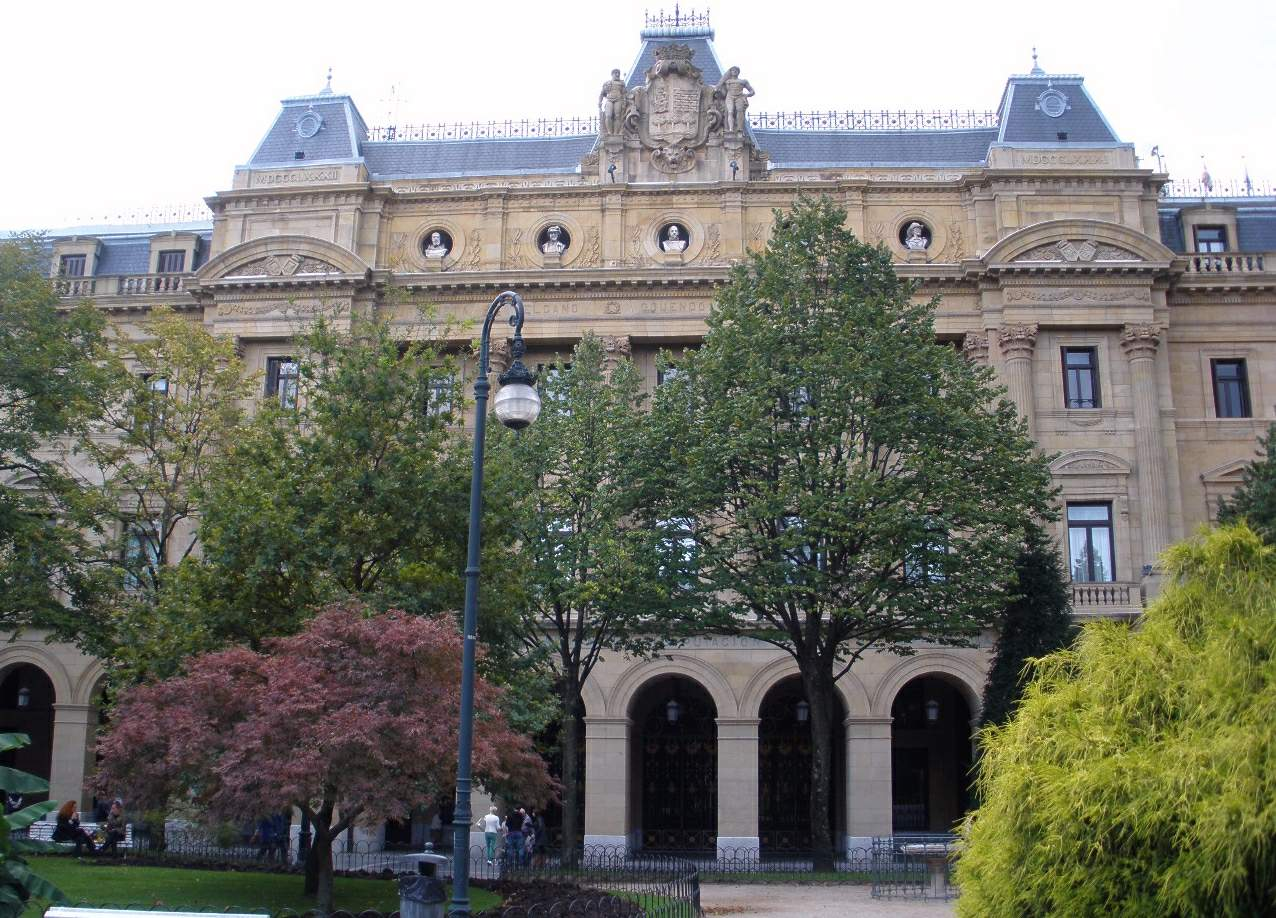
Gipuzkoan diputacion HQ, San Sebastián

In 1911 Valde-Espina renewed his bid for the provincial self-government, though this time for Diputación Provincial de Guipúscoa. Running from the district of Irun he was successful and later the same year he assumed presidency of the entire body. Progressist and democratic press agonized that "caudillo de la guerra civil, el marqués de Valdespina, es presidente de la diputación de Guipuzcoa", the Carlist one enjoyed days of triumph, though the latter were probably less happy about Valde-Espina entertaining the usurper king Alfonso XIII either when in the province or in Madrid. He remained head of the provincial government in 1911, 1912 and 1915, when he failed to get re-elected from Tolosa. His term was not marked by particular controversy, perhaps except a conflict related to a newly constructed railway line, deemed pursuant to Navarrese and Álavese interests at the expense of the Gipuzkoan ones; he is recorded as engaged mostly in standard admin duties, though also aiming at possible independence of provincial education faculties.

Though hardly engaged in nationwide party politics in the 1910s Valde-Espina was already a widely recognized personality within the Carlist realm, nominated honorary president of various bodies, also as far away as in Murcia, referred to as "veterano marqués" or "illustrious patrician", honored with occasional homages and pictured as profoundly moved when recollecting wartime service to Don Carlos 40 years before. His Astigarraga mansion turned into an iconic Carlist site, hosting gatherings and distinguished guests. As internal controversy between the key party theorist Juan Vázquez de Mella and the new king Don Jaime was getting increasingly visible he was trusted by the claimant, who demanded in vain that de Mella cedes ownership of the party mouthpiece, El Correo Español, to Valde-Espina.

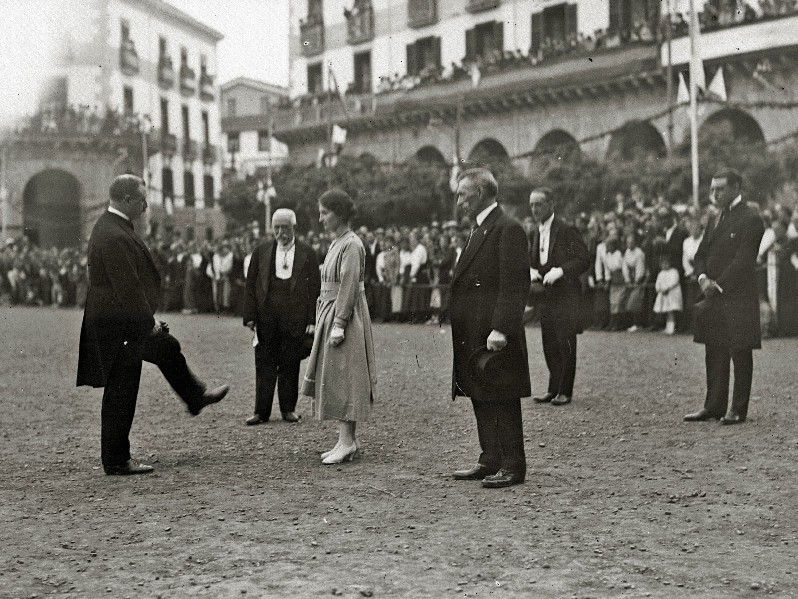
Sociedad de Estudios Vascos being founded, Oñati 1918

In 1917 Valde-Espina again presented himself for the Gipuzkoan diputación and narrowly he emerged successful from Irun. Re-elected two years later, he remained in the self-government until 1922, periodically – e.g. in 1918, or 1919 holding the presidency. His second term is marked mostly by the Basque question and the problem of legal standing of the Vascongadas. Already in 1917 he took part in a so-called Asamblea de Victoria, a gathering of provincial deputies from the region which voiced demands for "a broad autonomy". With colleagues from other Vasco-Navarrese deputations he probably voiced to the same end when in 1918 meeting Alfonso XIII or sending telegrams to Madrid. Some of his statements seem confusing; also in 1918 he abandoned the regional platform and declared that Gipuzkoa expected the same level of self-government as that considered for Catalonia. Officially sponsoring the launch of Sociedad de Estudios Vascos and contributing to its works, he firmly opposed nationalist Basque political ambitions. Also within the Carlist realm as Gipuzkoan jefé he contributed to initiatives advancing regionalist claims, though the term "autonomy" was cautiously accepted only in quotation marks.

== Breakup, retirement and reconciliation (1920s and 1930s) ==
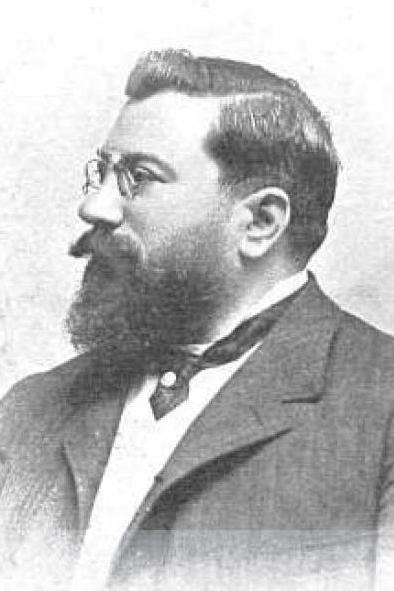
Juan Vazquez de Mella

Valde-Espina knew Vázquez de Mella at least since the early 1900s and used to meet him during various official party meetings, but was not known for particular sympathy towards the key party theorist. However, proclivity for conservative alliances might have made him closer to the Mellista strategy of forming a grand ultra-Right coalition; moreover, during the Great War Valde-Espina espoused a neutralist – and in effect anti-Entente – stand, very much advocated also by de Mella. When the conflict between the party pundit and the claimant exploded in early 1919 the Gipuzkoan jefé initially adopted an ambiguous position, but in the spring he was already widely suspected of defecting to the breakaway Mellsta camp. Indeed, after 85 years of loyalty of 3 generations of Valde-Espinas to legitimist claimants, José María left the orthodox Jaimista ranks and joined the rebels.

Due to own position and prestige of his family Valde-Espina was among the most notable personalities among the Mellistas, though probably due to his age he was not particularly active in buildup of the new party. Times when the family name mobilized popular support were long gone; historians consider some moderate backing, enjoyed by the breakaways among the rural Gipzukoan population, hardly resulting from his personal influence. Assigned a largely theoretical post of provincial jefe in the emerging party ranks he engaged in preparations to the grand assembly, supposed to launch a new organization nationwide. It materialized in 1922 in Zaragoza, though hardly in format originally envisioned by de Mella; the gathering launched Partido Católico Tradicionalista with Valde-Espina nominated president of its national executive committee. Indeed, in late 1922 he used to sign documents issued by the party and was noted as active in its ranks in early 1923. The Primo de Rivera coup brought political life to a standstill by banning all parties; the year marks final political retirement of Valde-Espina, who after that date was hardly recorded as politically active.

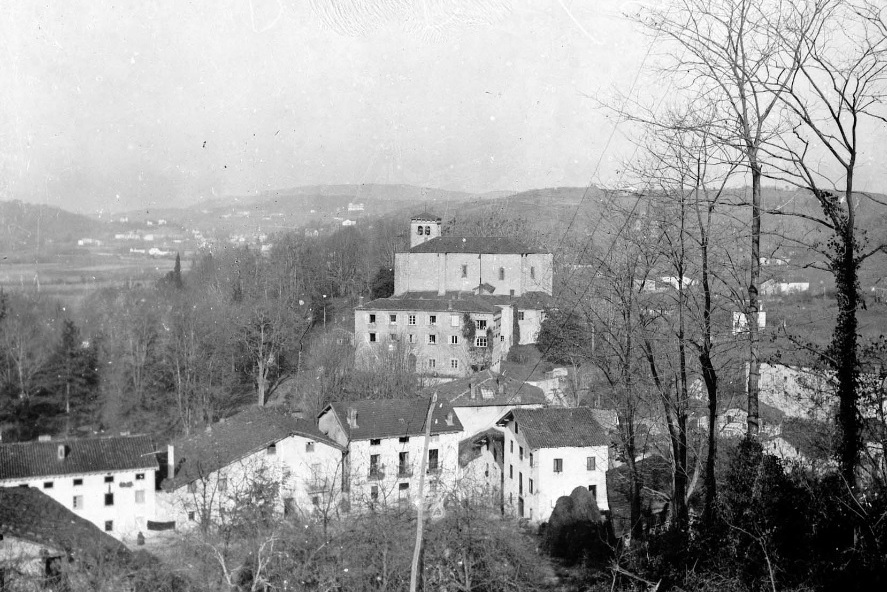
Valde-Espina mansion, Astigarraga

During the dictatorship in public Valde-Espina hardly embarked on anything else than charity. His last recorded political engagements are noted in the early 1930s. During dictablanda he signed the Euskaltzaindia appeal for launching consultations on Basque autonomy; the same year he sort of reconciled with the Carlists, recorded in August as present at opening of Círculo Jaimista in San Sebastián. In 1931-1932 he fully reintegrated within the united Carlist organization, Comunión Tradicionalista; despite his 84 years of age still suspected of anti-Republican conspiracy, in 1932 he got his Astigarraga estate raided by the police again. He was last noted as taking part in Carlist gathering in July 1932 in Villafranca. Having caught a cold during funeral of his younger son in February 1933, he spent the last 4 months of his life in bed. At the moment of his death Astigarraga mansion again enjoyed a status of an iconic Traditionalist site; also Ermua was one of few municipios in Biscay which kept resisting the Basque nationalist sway.

== See also ==
- Traditionalism (Spain)
- Mellismo
