= 1916 Spanish general election =

- 9 April 1916 (Congress) (Note: Candidates elected automatically under Article 29 of the Electoral Law were proclaimed on 2 April 1916.); 23 April 1916 (Senate)

All 409 seats in the Congress of Deputies and 180 (of 360) seats in the Senate 205 seats needed for a majority in the Congress of Deputies
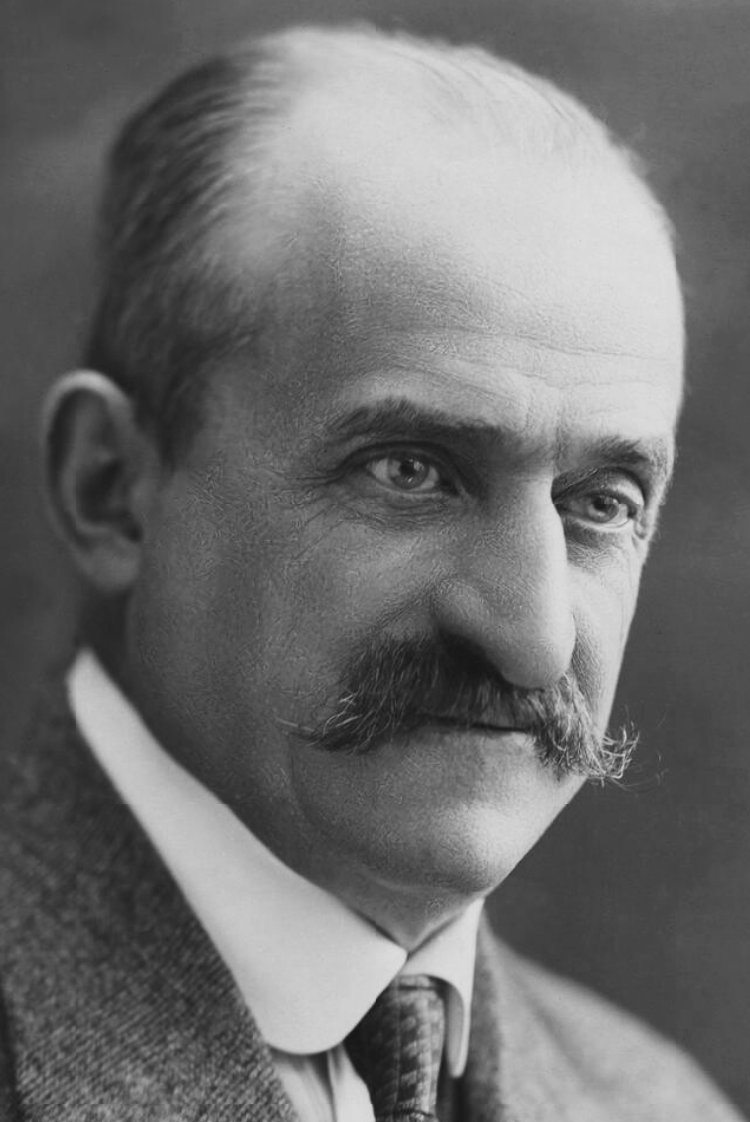

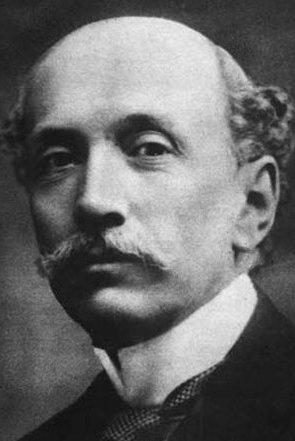

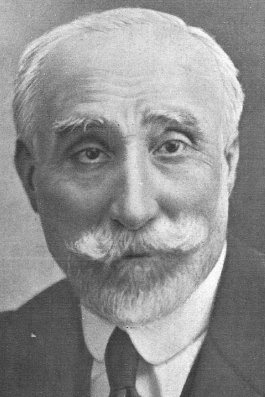

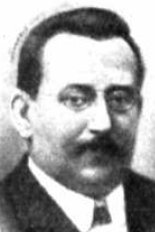

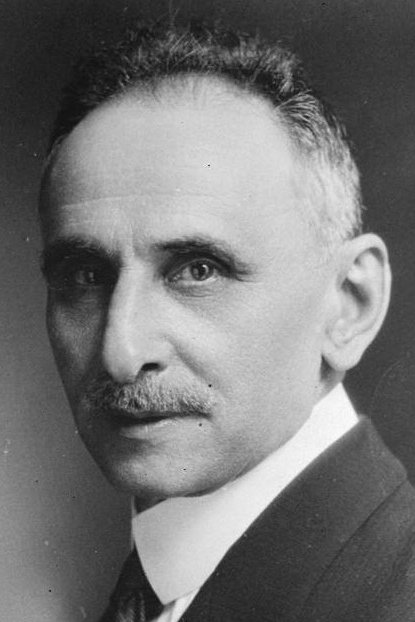

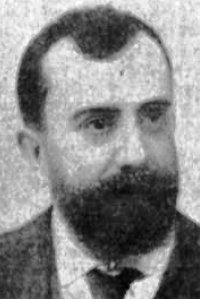
	First party	Second party	Third party
Leader	Count of Romanones	Eduardo Dato	Antonio Maura
Party	Liberal–Democratic	Conservative	Maurist
Leader since	1912	1913	1913
Leader's seat	Guadalajara	Vitoria	Palma
Last election	117 D · 53 S (Note: Results for PL (84 deputies and 41 senators) and PLD (33 deputies and 12 senators) in the 1914 election.)	191 D · 79 S	25 D · 14 S
Seats won	228 D · 112 S	89 D · 35 S	18 D · 6 S
Seat change	▲111 D · ▲59 S	▼102 D · ▼44 S	▼7 D · ▼8 S
	Fourth party	Fifth party	Sixth party
Leader	Enric Prat de la Riba	Melquíades Álvarez	Roberto Castrovido
Party	Regionalist	Reformist	Republican–Socialist
Leader since	1902	1912	1914
Leader's seat	Did not run	Castropol	Madrid
Last election	13 D · 6 S	12 D · 3 S	13 D · 2 S (Note: Results for CRS (12 deputies and 2 senators) and PURA (1 deputy and 0 senators) in the 1910 election.)
Seats won	13 D · 7 S	14 D · 2 S	13 D · 1 S
Seat change	0 D · ▲1 S	▲2 D · ▼1 S	0 D · ▼1 S
Prime Minister before election
Count of Romanones
Liberal
Prime Minister after election
Count of Romanones
Liberal

A general election was held in Spain on 9 April 1916 (for the Congress of Deputies), and on 23 April 1916 (for the Senate), to elect the members of the 16th Cortes under the Spanish Constitution of 1876, during the Restoration period. All 409 seats in the Congress of Deputies were up for election, as well as 180 of 360 seats in the Senate.

The turno system—under which Conservatives and Liberals had alternated in power by determining in advance the outcome of elections through caciquism and electoral fraud—had entered a phase of decline derived from the internal crises of the two dynastic parties, which had turned into a set of factions that made political rotation difficult. The Conservatives had fragmented between those supporting the continuity of the turno (the idóneos or "suitable ones", led by Prime Minister Eduardo Dato) and those following the political doctrine of Antonio Maura (the Maurist faction or mauristas), who had grown disaffected with it. In the Liberal camp, divisions were a result of personal rivalries between the Count of Romanones and the Marquis of Alhucemas.

Dato and Romanones initially agreed to support each other in maintaining the turno and fighting their respective dissidents, helped by a lessening of partisanship in 1914 due to the outbreak of World War I. The conflict saw an expansion of industrial activity as demand for Spanish goods rose among the warring powers—a result of the Dato government proclaiming the country's neutrality in the war—but the inflow of capital caused inflation and a drop in imports, exacerbating poverty in some areas of the country as the shortage of basic commodities led to food riots. Dato's attempt to avoid parliament (which was only in session for seven out of his 25-month tenure) alienated the Maurists, whereas his refusal to establish a free-trade zone in the port of Barcelona enraged Catalan regionalists. With Romanones and Alhucemas agreeing to a united front against the Conservative cabinet in the summer of 1915, Dato found himself isolated, resigning in December that year after being unable to pass a proposed military reform.

Re-appointed as prime minister by King Alfonso XIII, Romanones formed a cabinet with representation from all liberal factions, subsequently calling a general election that saw his government securing an overall majority. This would the last election until 1923 in which a single party or alliance would secure a majority of parliamentary support.

== Background ==
Following the Bourbon Restoration in 1874, the Spanish Constitution of 1876 enshrined Spain as a semi-constitutional monarchy, awarding the monarch—under the royal prerogative—the right of legislative initiative together with the bicameral Cortes; the capacity to veto laws passed by the legislative body; the power to appoint government members (including the prime minister); the ability to grant or deny parliamentary dissolution, the adjournment of legislative sessions and the signature of royal decrees; as well as the title of commander-in-chief of the armed forces. The monarch would play a key role in the turno system by appointing and dismissing governments, which would then organize elections to provide themselves with a parliamentary majority. This informal system allowed the two major "dynastic" political parties at the time, the Conservatives and the Liberals—characterized as oligarchic, elite parties with loose structures dominated by internal factions, each led by powerful individuals—to alternate in power by means of electoral fraud (pucherazo). This was achieved by assigning candidates to districts before the elections were held (encasillado), then arrange their victory through the links between the Ministry of Governance and the territorial clientelistic networks of provincial governors and local bosses (the caciques), excluding minor parties from the power sharing.

== Overview ==
Under the 1876 Constitution, the Spanish Cortes were conceived as "co-legislative bodies", forming a nearly perfect bicameral system. Both the Congress of Deputies and the Senate exercised legislative, oversight and budgetary functions, sharing almost equal powers, except in budget laws (taxation and public credit)—whose first reading corresponded to Congress—and in impeachment processes against government ministers, where Congress handled indictment and the Senate the trial.

=== Date ===
The term of each chamber of the Cortes—the Congress and one-half of the elective part of the Senate—expired five years from the date of their previous election, unless they were dissolved earlier. The previous elections were held on 8 March 1914 for the Congress and on 22 March 1914 for the Senate, which meant that the chambers' terms would have expired on 8 and 22 March 1919, respectively.

The monarch had the prerogative to dissolve both chambers at any given time—either jointly or separately—and call a snap election. There was no constitutional requirement for concurrent elections to the Congress and the Senate, nor for the elective part of the Senate to be renewed in its entirety except in the case that a full dissolution was agreed by the monarch. Still, there was only one case of a separate election (for the Senate in 1877) and no half-Senate elections taking place under the 1876 Constitution.

The Cortes were officially dissolved on 16 March 1916, with the corresponding decree setting election day for 9 April (Congress) and 23 April 1916 (Senate) and scheduling for both chambers to reconvene on 10 May.

=== Electoral system ===
Voting for the Congress of Deputies was based on universal manhood suffrage, comprising all Spanish national males over 25 years of age with full civil rights, provided they had two years of residence in a Spanish municipality and were not enlisted ranks in active duty. It was compulsory, excepting those over 70, the clergy and—within their territories—trial judges and public notaries. Additional restrictions excluded those deprived of political rights or barred from public office by a final sentence, criminally imprisoned or convicted, legally incapacitated, bankrupt, public debtors, and homeless.

The Congress of Deputies had one seat per 50,000 inhabitants. Of these, those corresponding to larger urban areas were elected in multi-member constituencies using partial block voting: voters in constituencies electing ten seats or more could choose up to four candidates less than the number of seats at stake; in those with between eight and ten seats, up to three less; in those with between four and eight seats, up to two less; and in those with between one and four seats, up to one less. The remaining seats were elected in single-member districts by plurality voting and distributed among the provinces of Spain according to population. Candidates in uncontested seats were automatically elected. (Note: Uncontested districts were those where the number of candidates was equal to or fewer than the available seats. Whenever vacancies remained, a by-election was held to fill the remaining seats.)

As a result of the aforementioned allocation, 311 single-member districts were established, and each Congress multi-member constituency (a total of 28, electing 98 seats) was entitled the following seats:

Seats	Constituencies
8	Madrid
7	Barcelona
5	Palma, Seville
4	Cartagena
3	Alicante, Almería, Badajoz, Burgos, Cádiz, Córdoba, Gran Canaria, Granada, Huelva, Jaén, Jerez de la Frontera, La Coruña, Lugo, Málaga, Murcia, Oviedo, Pamplona, Santander, Tarragona, Tenerife, Valencia, Valladolid, Zaragoza

Voting for the elective part of the Senate was based on censitary suffrage, comprising Spanish male householders of voting age, residing in a Spanish municipality, with full political and civil rights, who met either of the following:

- Being qualified electors (such as archbishops, bishops and cathedral chapter members, in the archdioceses; full academics, in the royal academies; university authorities and professors, in the universities; or provincial deputies);
- Being elected as delegates (either by members with three years of seniority (in the economic societies of Friends of the Country; or by major taxpayers for direct taxes and local authorities, in the local councils).

180 Senate seats were elected using indirect, two-round majority voting. Delegates chosen by local councils—each of which was assigned an initial minimum of one delegate, with one additional delegate for every six councillors—voted for senators together with provincial deputies. The provinces of Barcelona, Madrid and Valencia were allocated four seats each, and the rest three each, for a total of 150. The remaining 30 seats were allocated to special institutional districts (one each), including major archdioceses, royal academies, universities, and economic societies, (Note: The following were considered as the major districts in each category: Archdioceses: Burgos, Granada, Santiago de Compostela, Seville, Tarragona, Toledo, Valencia, Valladolid, and Zaragoza.; Royal academies: Spanish; History; Fine Arts of San Fernando; Exact, Physical and Natural Sciences; Moral and Political Sciences; and Medicine.; Universities: Madrid, Barcelona, Granada, Oviedo, Salamanca, Santiago, Seville, Valencia, Valladolid, and Zaragoza.; Economic societies of Friends of the Country: Madrid, Barcelona, León, Seville, and Valencia.) each elected by their own qualified electors or delegates. Another 180 seats consisted of senators in their own right (such as the monarch's offspring and the heir apparent once coming of age (16), grandees of Spain with an income of Pts 60,000, certain general officers—captain generals and admirals—the Patriarch of the Indies and archbishops, and the heads of higher courts and state institutions (Note: These comprised the Council of State, the Supreme Court, the Court of Auditors and the Supreme Council of War and Navy.) after two years of service), as well as senators for life directly appointed by the monarch.

The law provided for by-elections to fill vacant seats during the legislative term.

== Candidates ==
=== Nomination rules ===
For the Congress, secular Spanish males of voting age, with full civil rights, could run for election. Causes of ineligibility applied to those excluded from voting or meeting any of the incompatibility rules for deputies, as well as to:

- Public contractors, within their relevant territories;
- Holders of a number of territorial posts (such as government-appointed positions, not including government ministers and Central Administration employees; local and provincial employees; and provincial deputation members), within their areas of jurisdiction, during their term of office and up to one year afterwards.
- Servants in the judiciary or the prosecution ministry.

Additionally, candidates were required to either have previously served as deputies or be nominated by two current or former senators (or same-province deputies); three current or former provincial deputies (from the same province); or at least one twentieth of the electorate in the constituencies for which they sought election, disallowing electors from nominating more than one candidate (except in multi-member constituencies, which used the same partial block voting system for nominations as for elections).

For the Senate, eligibility was limited to Spanish males over 35 years of age not under criminal prosecution, disfranchisement nor asset seizure, and who either qualified as senators in their own right or belonged (or had belonged) to certain categories:

- Provided an income of Pts 7,500: the presidents of the Senate and the Congress; deputies serving in three different congresses or eight terms; government ministers; bishops; grandees of Spain not eligible as senators in their own right; and various senior officials after two years of service (such as certain general officers—lieutenant generals and vice admirals—and members of higher courts and state institutions); heads of diplomatic missions abroad (ambassadors after two years, and plenipotentiaries after four); heads and full academics in the royal academies; chief engineers; and full professors with four years of service;
- Provided an income of Pts 20,000 or being taxpayers with a minimum quota of Pts 4,000 in direct taxes (paid two years in advance): Spanish nobility; and former deputies, provincial deputies or mayors in provincial capitals or towns over 20,000;
- Having served as senators before the promulgation of the 1876 Constitution.

Other ineligibility provisions for the Senate also applied to a number of territorial officials within their areas of jurisdiction, during their term of office and up to three months afterwards; public contractors; tax collectors; and public debtors.

Incompatibility rules barred combining:

- The role of senator with other legislative roles (deputy, senator and local councillor, except those in Madrid; and provincial deputies within their respective provinces); or with any public post not explicitly permitted under Senate eligibility requirements;
- The role of deputy with any other civil, military or judicial post, with exceptions—and as many as 40 deputies allowed to simultaneously benefit from these—including a number of specific posts based in Madrid, such as any of the aforementioned ones (provided a public salary of Pts 12,500); senior court officials; university authorities and professors; chief engineers; and general officers.

== Results ==
=== Congress of Deputies ===
← Summary of the 9 April 1916 Congress of Deputies election results →
Parties and alliances	Popular vote		Seats		
Parties and alliances	Votes	%	A.29	Cont.	Total
Liberal Party–Liberal Democrats (PL–LD)			90	138	228
Conservative Party (PC)			37	52	89
Maurist Party (PM)			5	13	18
Reformist Party (PRef)			4	10	14
Republican–Socialist Conjunction (CRS)			1	12	13
Regionalist League (LR)			1	12	13
Traditionalist Communion (Jaimist) (CT)			2	7	9
Republican Coalition (PRR–UFNR)			2	5	7
Ciervist Conservatives (CC)			1	6	7
Integrist Party (PI)			0	2	2
Autonomist Republican Bloc (BRA)			0	1	1
Burgalese Regionalist Party (PRB)			0	1	1
Independents (INDEP)			2	5	7
Total			145	264	409
Votes cast / turnout					
Abstentions					
Registered voters					

Seats
PL–LD	55.75%
PC	21.76%
PM	4.40%
PRef	3.42%
CRS	3.18%
LR	3.18%
CT	2.20%
PRR–UFNR	1.71%
CC	1.71%
PI	0.49%
BRA	0.24%
PRB	0.24%
INDEP	1.71%

=== Senate ===
← Summary of the 23 April 1916 Senate of Spain election results →
Parties and alliances	Seats
Liberal Party–Liberal Democrats (PL–LD)	112
Conservative Party (PC)	35
Regionalist League (LR)	7
Maurist Party (PM)	6
Reformist Party (PRef)	2
Ciervist Conservatives (CC)	2
Republican–Socialist Conjunction (CRS)	1
Traditionalist Communion (Jaimist) (CT)	1
Integrist Party (PI)	1
Independents (INDEP)	4
Archbishops (ARCH)	9
Total elective seats	180

Seats
PL–LD	62.22%
PC	19.44%
LR	3.89%
PM	3.33%
PRef	1.11%
CC	1.11%
CRS	0.56%
CT	0.56%
PI	0.56%
INDEP	2.22%
ARCH	5.00%

=== Distribution by group ===
Summary of political group distribution in the 16th Restoration Cortes (1916–1918)
Group	Parties and alliances	C	S	Total
PL–LD	Liberal Party–Liberal Democrats (PL–LD)	225	112	340
PL–LD	Monarchist Coalition (MON)	3	0	340
PC	Conservative Party (PC)	88	35	125
PC	Monarchist Coalition (MON)	2	0	125
PM	Maurist Party (PM)	17	6	23
LR	Regionalist League (LR)	13	7	20
PRef	Reformist Party (PRef)	14	2	16
CRS	Republican Party (PRep)	10	1	14
CRS	Spanish Socialist Workers' Party (PSOE)	1	0	14
CRS	Autonomist Republican Union Party (PURA)	1	0	14
CRS	Independent Republicans (R.IND)	1	0	14
CT	Traditionalist Communion (Jaimist) (CT)	9	1	10
CC	Ciervist Conservatives (CC)	7	2	9
PRR– UFNR	Radical Republican Party (PRR)	5	0	7
PRR– UFNR	Republican Nationalist Federal Union (UFNR)	2	0	7
PI	Integrist Party (PI)	2	1	3
BRA	Autonomist Republican Bloc (BRA)	1	0	1
PRB	Burgalese Regionalist Party (PRB)	1	0	1
INDEP	Independents (INDEP)	3	2	11
INDEP	Basque Dynastics (Urquijist) (DV)	1	2	11
INDEP	Independent Catholics (CAT)	2	0	11
INDEP	Independent Liberals (L.IND)	1	0	11
ARCH	Archbishops (ARCH)	0	9	9
Total		409	180	589

== Bibliography ==
Legislation

- Ley mandando que los distritos para las elecciones de Diputados a Cortes sean los que se expresan en la división adjunta (PDF) (Law). Madrid Gazette (in Spanish). 1 January 1871.
- Constitución de la Monarquía Española (PDF) (Constitution). Madrid Gazette (in Spanish). 30 June 1876.
- Ley electoral de Senadores (PDF) (Law). Madrid Gazette (in Spanish). 8 February 1877.
- Ley electoral de los Diputados a Cortes (PDF) (Law). Madrid Gazette (in Spanish). 28 December 1878.
- Ley enumerando los empleos con los cuales es compatible el cargo de Diputado a Cortes (PDF) (Law). Madrid Gazette (in Spanish). 7 March 1880.
- Ley dividiendo la provincia de Guipúzcoa en distritos para la elección de Diputados a Cortes (PDF) (Law). Madrid Gazette (in Spanish). 23 June 1885.
- Ley dividiendo el distrito electoral de Tarrasa en dos, que se denominarán de Tarrasa y de Sabadell (PDF) (Law). Madrid Gazette (in Spanish). 18 January 1887.
- Ley reformando el art. 4º. de la ley de Incompatibilidades (PDF) (Law). Madrid Gazette (in Spanish). 31 July 1887.
- Ley fijando la división de la provincia de Álava en distritos electorales para Diputados a Cortes (PDF) (Law). Madrid Gazette (in Spanish). 10 July 1888.
- Ley electoral para Diputados a Cortes (PDF) (Law). Madrid Gazette (in Spanish). 26 June 1890.
- Ley disponiendo que las primeras y sucesivas elecciones que se verifiquen en la provincia de Zamora se dividirá en siete distritos en la forma que se expresa (PDF) (Law). Madrid Gazette (in Spanish). 18 June 1895.
- Leyes aprobando la división electoral de las provincias de León y Vizcaya (PDF) (Law). Madrid Gazette (in Spanish). 2 August 1895.
- Leyes aprobando la división electoral en las provincias de Sevilla y de Barcelona (PDF) (Law). Madrid Gazette (in Spanish). 5 July 1898.
- Real decreto disponiendo el número de Senadores que han de elegir las provincias que se citan (PDF) (Royal Decree). Madrid Gazette (in Spanish). 16 March 1899.
- Ley mandando que en lo sucesivo sean cuatro los Diputados a Cortes que elegirá la circunscripción electoral de Cartagena (PDF) (Law). Madrid Gazette (in Spanish). 7 August 1899.
- Ley estableciendo una circunscripción para elegir tres Diputados a Cortes, que la constituirán los cuatro partidos judiciales de Ayamonte, Hueva, Moguer y la Palma, con todas las poblaciones que de ellos forman parte (PDF) (Law). Madrid Gazette (in Spanish). 24 March 1902.
- Ley reformando la Electoral vigente (PDF) (Law). Madrid Gazette (in Spanish). 8 August 1907.
- Ley disponiendo que el territorio de la Nación española que constituye el Archipiélago canario, cuya capitalidad reside en Santa Cruz de Tenerife, conserve su unidad, ateniéndose los servicios públicos en el modo y forma que se determina en esta ley (PDF) (Law). Madrid Gazette (in Spanish). 11 July 1912.
- Real decreto declarando disuelto el Congreso de los Diputados y la parte electiva del Senado; que las elecciones de Diputados se verifiquen el 9 de Abril próximo y las de Senadores el 23 de igual mes, y que las Cortes se reúnan en Madrid el 10 de Mayo siguiente (PDF) (Royal Decree). Madrid Gazette (in Spanish). 16 March 1916.
- Real decreto disponiendo que la isla de La Palma (Canarias) se divida, a los efectos de las elecciones para Diputados a Cortes, en dos distritos, que se denominarán de Santa Cruz de la Palma y de Los Llanos (PDF) (Royal Decree). Madrid Gazette (in Spanish). 20 March 1916.

Other

- Calero, Antonio María (1987). "La prerrogativa regia en la Restauración: teoría y práctica (1875-1902)" (PDF). Revista de Estudios Políticos (in Spanish) (55). Madrid: Centre for Political and Constitutional Studies: 273–315. ISSN 0048-7694.
- Ortega Álvarez, Luis; Santaolaya Machetti, Pablo (1996). "Evolución histórica del sistema electoral español". Revista de las Cortes Generales (in Spanish). 37. Cortes Generales: 65–107. doi:10.33426/rcg/1996/37/784. ISSN 0213-0130.
- Martorell Linares, Miguel Ángel (1997). "La crisis parlamentaria de 1913-1917. La quiebra del sistema de relaciones parlamentarias de la Restauración" (PDF). Revista de Estudios Políticos (in Spanish) (96). Madrid: Centre for Political and Constitutional Studies: 137–161. ISSN 0048-7694.
- Martínez Ruiz, Enrique; Maqueda Abreu, Consuelo; De Diego, Emilio (1999). Atlas histórico de España. El Reinado de Alfonso XIII (1902-1931) (in Spanish). Vol. 2. Bilbao: Ediciones KAL. pp. 121–132. ISBN 9788470903502.
- Armengol i Segú, Josep; Varela Ortega, José (2001). El poder de la influencia: geografía del caciquismo en España (1875-1923) (in Spanish). Madrid: Marcial Pons. pp. 655–776. ISBN 9788425911521.
- García Muñoz, Montserrat (2002). "La documentación electoral y el fichero histórico de diputados". Revista General de Información y Documentación (in Spanish). 12 (1): 93–137. ISSN 1132-1873.
- Carreras de Odriozola, Albert; Tafunell Sambola, Xavier (2005) [1989]. Estadísticas históricas de España, siglos XIX-XX (PDF) (in Spanish). Vol. 1 (II ed.). Bilbao: Fundación BBVA. pp. 1072–1097. ISBN 84-96515-00-1. Archived from the original (PDF) on 24 September 2015.
- Martínez Relanzón, Alejandro (2017). "Political Modernization in Spain Between 1876 and 1923". Annales Universitatis Mariae Curie-Skłodowska, Sectio K. 24 (1). Madrid: Maria Curie-Skłodowska University: 145–154. doi:10.17951/k.2017.24.1.145. S2CID 159328027.
- Martorell Linares, Miguel (2022). "Personajes: Santiago Alba y Bonifaz" (in Spanish). Royal Academy of History.
- Álvarez Tardío, Manuel (2022). "Personajes: Melquíades Álvarez y González Posada" (in Spanish). Royal Academy of History.
- Seco Serrano, Carlos (2022). "Personajes: Eduardo Dato Iradier" (in Spanish). Royal Academy of History.
- Moreno Luzón, Javier (2022). "Personajes: Álvaro de Figueroa y Torres" (in Spanish). Royal Academy of History.
- Sainz de Vicuña y García-Prieto, Manuel (2022). "Personajes: Manuel García Prieto" (in Spanish). Royal Academy of History.
- Cuenca Toribio, José Manuel (2022). "Personajes: Antonio Maura y Montaner" (in Spanish). Royal Academy of History.
- Ruiz Franco, Rosario (2024a). "Historia Contemporánea de España. Reinado de Alfonso XIII (1902-1923). España y la I Guerra Mundial" (PDF) (in Spanish). Charles III University of Madrid.
- Ruiz Franco, Rosario (2024b). "Historia Contemporánea de España. Reinado de Alfonso XIII (1902-1923). Consecuencias de la I Guerra Mundial en España" (PDF) (in Spanish). Charles III University of Madrid.
