= Cacique democracy =

Term coined for the feudal political system of the Philippines

Cacique democracy is a term that has been used to describe what has been observed as the feudal political system of the Philippines, where in many parts of the country local leaders remain very strong, with warlord-like powers. The term was originally coined by Irish-American political scientist Benedict Anderson.

== History ==
The Philippines was the main component of the Spanish East Indies colony from the late sixteenth century until the Philippine Revolution of 1898. The United States, despite promising independence as in the case of Cuba, bought the country and wrestled control, succeeding by 1902. The U.S. administration subsequently introduced many commercial, political and administrative changes, trade limits, agricultural and immigration sanctions, and machine importation restrictions. They were sometimes quite progressive and directed towards the "modernization" of government and commerce in the Philippines. However, local traditional Filipino elites, being better educated and better connected than much of the local population, were often able to take advantage of the changes to bolster their positions.

== Etymology ==
The Spanish word cacique comes from the Taíno word kassiquan, meaning "to keep house." In Spanish America, Brazil, Spain, and Portugal, the term also has come to mean a political boss or leader who exercises significant power in the political system known as caciquismo, and is sometimes translated as "Bossism." In various Austronesian languages, datu, along with its cognates, is a title roughly similar to cacique, and had historically been conferred upon the ruler of a maṇḍala or precolonial fiefdom.

== See also ==
- Kedatuan
- Maṇḍala
