= Pucherazo =

Term in Spain for an electoral fraud

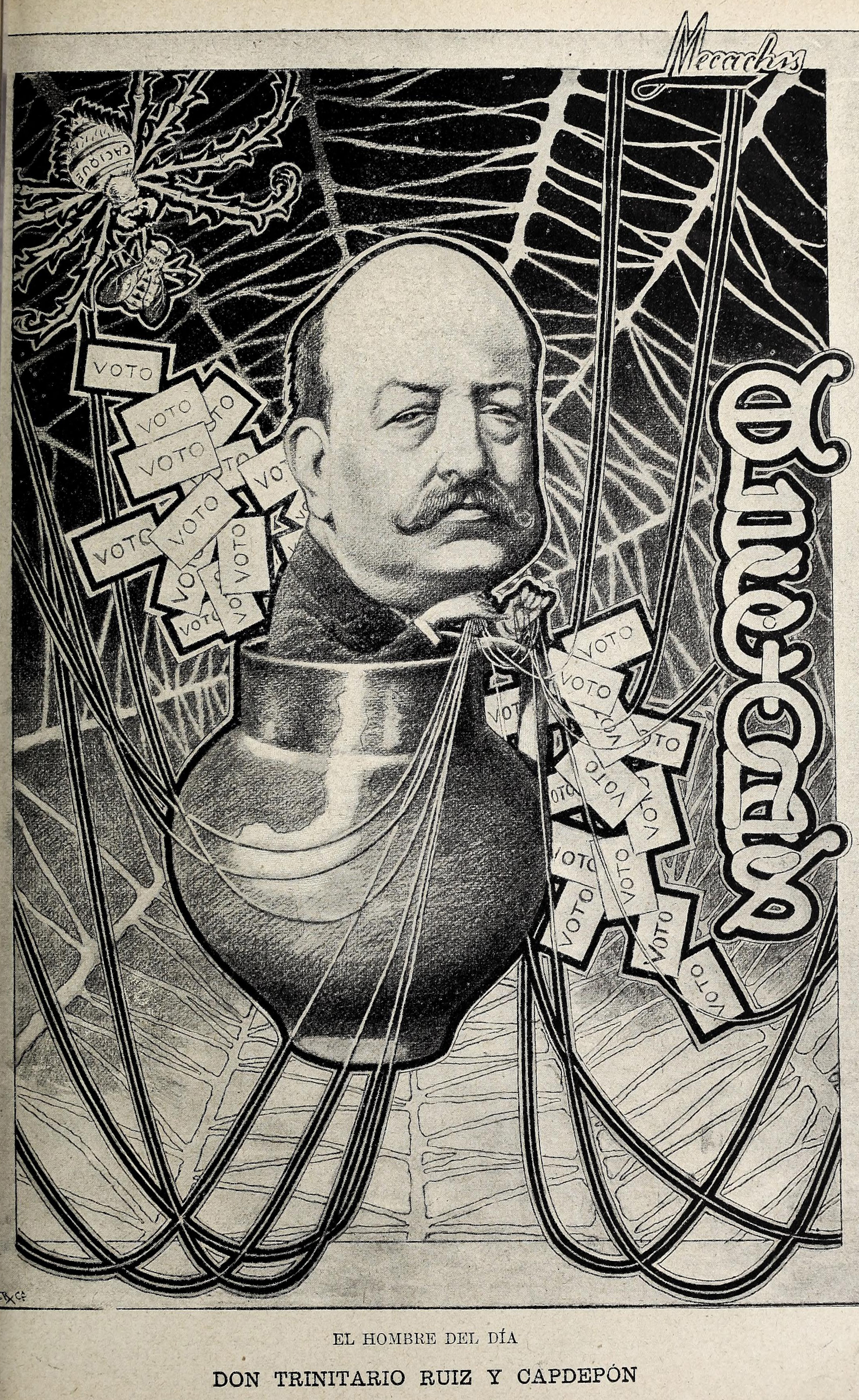
Caricature from the magazine Blanco y Negro (1898) showing the congressman Trinitario Ruiz y Capdepón coming out of the pot with the votes provided by the cacique network (above left, the cacique is depicted in the form of a spider).

The term pucherazo is used in Spain to refer to an electoral fraud in terms of illegally manipulating the results of an election.

== Origin ==
The term "pucherazo" originated during the period of the Bourbon Restoration in Spain, as part of the electoral fraud methods used to maintain the agreed alternation between the Liberal Party and the Conservative Party, known as turnismo. This system of local political domination, especially rooted in rural areas and small towns, is known as caciquism.

The pucherazo consisted of electoral manipulation through the withholding of ballots, which were kept in containers as pucheros (hence the popularized name). These ballots were added to or subtracted from the ballot box according to convenience, with the objective of altering the desired result. Other methods used included the location of ballot boxes in places of difficult access and the manipulation of votes through the use of "lázaros" (votes of deceased people who, at least in theory, were resurrected like the Lazarus of the Gospels) and "cuneros" (candidates who were registered in a constituency where they had no personal or political ties).

Throughout Spanish electoral history, the term "pucherazo" has endured as a synonym for electoral fraud.

== History ==
=== Reign of Amadeo I ===
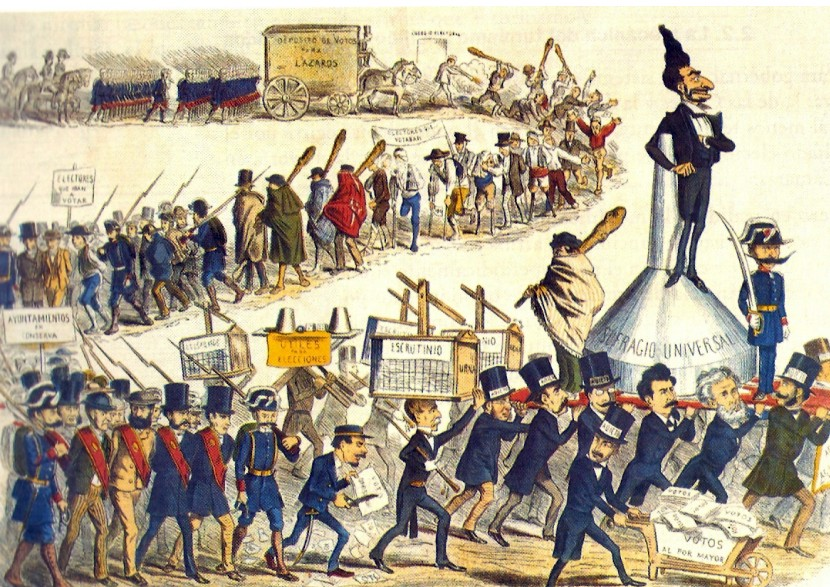
Satirical cartoon of La Carcajada (new masthead of the magazine La Flaca to avoid the administrative suspension) published on April 18, 1872, with the title "Triunfo electoral" (electoral triumph). It ironizes about the fraudulent methods used by the president of the government and Minister of the Interior Práxedes Mateo Sagasta to win the elections of April 1872. Sagasta leads the procession carried on the back of a funnel with the sign "SUFRAGIO UNIVERSAL" (universal suffrage). He is followed by all those who have made the "electoral triumph" possible: forces of public order, partidas de la porra, lázaros (so called because they are deceased electors who have "resurrected" incarnated by other people), hired assassins, trileros, local authorities, imprisoned peasants and workers taken to vote, etc.

In the Spanish general elections of April 1872 the governmental candidacies won a landslide victory thanks to what was then euphemistically called "the moral influence of the government". The president of the executive, who also held the Interior portfolio, was Práxedes Mateo Sagasta, who, in order to ensure the triumph of his party, the Constitutional, gave a series of instructions to the civil governors of each province in which, among other things, they were ordered to do the following:

Taking advantage of second order republicans, but influential in the masses and with the corresponding secrecy, the governor must buy at two reales or peseta the largest possible number of ballots belonging to federal electors. On the day of the election, half an hour before the opening of the polling stations, a considerable number of royalist electors should crowd at the door of each one, a sufficient number to completely occupy the hall of the polling station... which will not facilitate the access only to those who are convenient. It would seem excused to warn that at the door of each college the authority must have public order agents of heart and energy, who at the slightest pretext will do well to distribute some sticks and to take immediately to the jails those who give reason to do so. At the opening of the polling place, which must be held half an hour before nine o'clock in the morning, for which purpose the president and secretary will keep their watches half an hour ahead, there must be in the ballot boxes as many ballots in favor of the ministerial candidacy as there are purchased ballots in the possession of the governor.

=== Restoration ===
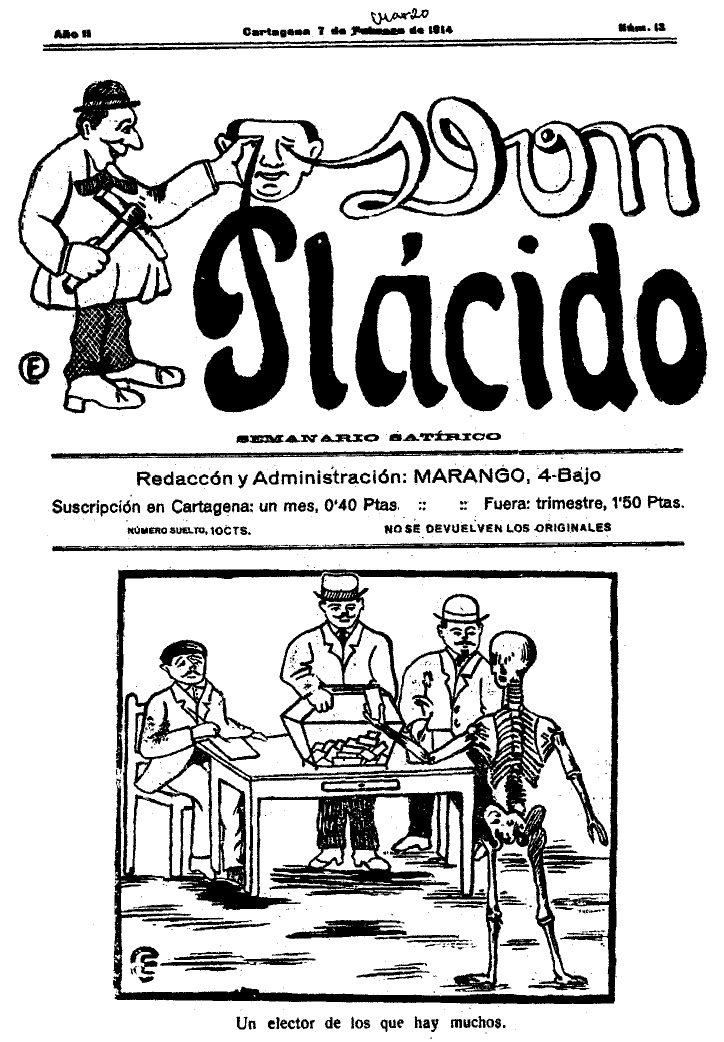
Cover of the satirical weekly Don Placido, of Cartagena, in 1914. It shows a skeleton voting with the subtitle "Un elector de los que hay muchos" (One of many voters), as a denunciation of electoral fraud. It represents the case of the so-called false voters lázaros who took the name of a deceased person who was thus resurrected.

All the elections during the Bourbon Restoration in Spain were fraudulent since the result was determined in advance ("encasillado") because of the cacique network spread throughout the territory. In all of them the government that called the elections won them, since in the political regime of the Restoration the governments changed before the elections and not after as happened in parliamentary regimes (not fraudulent). As Feliciano Montero has pointed out, "the king [or in his case the regent] was the one who, in fact, by means of the decree of dissolution of the Cortes, granted to the person designated to form the government, made possible the rise or fall of power to the different political leaders and formations.... This form of access [to power] subverted the logic of parliamentary practice. It was not the Cortes that provoked political crises and caused governments to change, since each ruling party fabricated a sufficient parliamentary majority for itself through fraudulent elections. The partial or total ministerial crises, the alternatives in the exercise of power (the turn), were decided among the high political spheres (the elite) outside Parliament, on the basis of the monarchical initiative...".

A similar assessment to that of Feliciano Montero is made by Carmelo Romero Salvador when he states that "what to a greater extent distinguishes the Spanish case... [is] the fact that government action determined that the party that called the elections always won them, and that this was normalized and institutionalized as a result of the pact between the two majority parties that, since 1881 and for more than forty years, decided to alternate in power". "It was the government that made the Cortes, not the other way around; and whoever made the elections never lost them", concluded José Varela Ortega.

The management of the whole fraud procedure depended on the Ministry of the Interior, which through the civil governors gave the pertinent instructions to the mayors responsible for the electoral census and for organizing the polling stations so that the encasillados candidates would be elected.

In 1907 a new electoral law was passed with the theoretical objective of eliminating the pucherazo, but it contained procedures that in practice encouraged it. The main one, established in article 29, consisted in the fact that in the constituency where only one candidate was presented, he/she was automatically elected, without the need to hold a vote. There came to be electoral calls, such as that of 1923, in which up to 146 deputies obtained their seats without the need to go to the polls and thus 30% of the electoral roll could not exercise their theoretical right to vote. This law was in force until the municipal elections of 1931, where many councilors were elected by this procedure (14 018 monarchists and 1832 republicans)..

=== Second Republic ===
The Second Republic took measures to make the elections clean and transparent, such as the figure of the interventor of the party, the provision whereby voters' fingers were marked with indelible ink, etc. The electoral law of the Second Spanish Republic was criticized by some sectors for the difference in seats granted to the "majorities" over the "minorities" (for example, in the constituency of the city of Barcelona, with a total of 20 deputies, the most voted party or coalition obtained 16, and the next 4; even the 20 seats could be obtained by the majority if a series of requirements were met). Another aspect criticized was that the validation of the minutes did not correspond to the courts or to another independent body, but to a commission formed by the elected parliamentarians themselves. Its performance provoked criticism especially after the elections of February 1936.

The result of the referendum on the 1936 Draft Statute of Autonomy of Galicia was also criticized. The Republican Constitution demanded a two-thirds majority of yes in the referendums on the Statute of Autonomy, not on voters, but on registered people, and such a high yes was disputed. The referendum was held on June 28, one month before the beginning of the Civil War, and it was qualified as a holy pucherazo by its own supporters.

=== Francoism (from 1967) ===
During the Franco dictatorship there were no elections, as the members of the Cortes were appointed directly or indirectly by the Head of State Francisco Franco. An elective procedure was only introduced for a reduced part of them (100 procuradores) at the end of Franco's regime when in 1967 the Organic Law of the State was approved, which modified the Constitutive Law of the Cortes of July 17, 1942, establishing that there would be "two representatives of the Family for each province, elected by those who appear in the electoral census of heads of families and by married women, in the manner established by law". In the Family Representation Law of 1967, it was determined that the candidates would run individually, since political parties were prohibited, except for FET y de las JONS, the only party of the Dictatorship. There were two elections for the so-called "family third", the first one held in the same year of 1967 and the next one in 1971.

== Irregularities during the Transition and Democracy ==
The recovery of democratic elections in 1977 was done by means of a proportional electoral system, instead of the majority system (which had been the traditional one in Spain). The D'Hondt system was applied for the distribution of seats. The main criticism it receives is that the provincial constituency, added to the existence of provinces of small population, benefits the majority parties, both at the state level (currently PP and PSOE) and at the regional level, to the detriment of the minority parties at the state level (currently UP or Ciudadanos). The guarantee of the electoral system depends on the judicial authority, through the provincial electoral boards and the Central Electoral Commission.

=== Electoral count ===
At the end of the elections, the members of each polling station count the votes in the presence of intervenors from the different political parties. The results of the voting are recorded in official minutes and placed in an envelope called "envelope number 1". This envelope is sent to the Electoral Commission for verification and filing. In parallel, a representative of the administration receives the voting data and transmits it to a data center for immediate dissemination. This representative is not usually a civil servant, but an external worker, usually from the company Indra, who has been hired for the task.

According to the Electoral Law, the judges who sit on the Electoral Boards are obliged to verify the veracity of the data that has been entered into the computer system, contrasting it with the data in the voting record in "envelope number 1". In theory, this provides an additional layer of verification and security to ensure that the data being disseminated matches the actual votes cast at the polls. However, in practice, this verification step is not performed systematically. The data entered into the computer system is not routinely compared with the data in the voting record in "envelope number 1". The Seville Electoral Board acknowledged the existence of this irregularity, arguing that it had no effect on the validity of the election results and that this lack of verification was standard practice throughout the country. However, this lack of verification could open the door to possible errors or manipulations in the vote count, and may be considered a violation of the procedures established by law.

The elections with the most controversial recount were the 1989 general elections, where 4 seats were disputed. In the end the PSOE won all but the one in Melilla, as the courts decided to repeat the elections in Murcia, Pontevedra and Melilla. In Barcelona the courts did not take this measure, and in the end the Constitutional Court decided that there would only be a repetition in Melilla.

=== Buying of postal voting ===
On some occasions irregularities have been denounced in postal voting and votes from immigration, which are judicially investigated as electoral crimes. Two forms of fraud in the postal vote stand out: the lack of requirement of the DNI in the last phase of the process and the purchase of votes.

In the last phase of the vote by mail, which consists of sending the vote by registered mail, the presentation of the identification document at the post office is not required. This lack of identification requirement opens up an opportunity for fraud, as anyone can send a vote on behalf of another without their consent or knowledge. This situation calls into question the reliability and security of the postal voting system. The electoral law prohibits this practice, as the vote must be free and secret, without being influenced by gifts or promises.

In the case of voters who agree to sell their vote, they may also face legal consequences. Although the primary responsibility lies with those who buy votes, people who sell their vote may be considered accomplices or necessary cooperators to the crime. In addition, depending on the circumstances, they may incur other related offenses, such as belonging to a criminal organization or engaging in money laundering activities.

In legal terms, both the sale and the purchase of votes are considered crimes. The electoral law establishes prison sentences of six months to three years or fines of twelve to twenty-four months for those who directly or indirectly solicit votes by means of rewards, gifts, remuneration or promises. These penalties apply to those who buy votes and actively participate in electoral fraud.

=== Inflation of the Electoral Roll ===
Inflation of the electoral roll refers to the act of artificially increasing the number of persons registered in the census with the right to vote, particularly in periods close to elections. This phenomenon can be observed when the number of people registered in a locality experiences an anomalous or significant increase just before the closing of the list of people entitled to vote. This increase may be the result of illegitimate practices, such as the registration of persons who do not normally reside in that locality, with the aim of influencing the election results. Sometimes, this situation may be motivated by the desire to retain power in a given place, to win more mayorships, or to influence the composition of supra-municipal bodies. Institutions responsible for overseeing the census, such as the National Institute of Statistics and the Electoral Census Office, may detect these unusual increases and ask municipalities to justify this growth. If a satisfactory explanation cannot be given, the case may be brought before the Central Electoral Commission for investigation. The inflation of the electoral roll can be considered an electoral fraud, since it alters the number of voters in a municipality, thus being able to manipulate the election results.

== See also ==
- Encasillado
