= Burgalese Regionalist Party =

Burgalese Regionalist Party Partido Regionalista Burgalés
- Leader: Antonio Zumárraga Díez
- Founded: 1916
- Dissolved: 1921
- Ideology: Burgalese regionalism

The Burgalese Regionalist Party (Spanish: Partido Regionalista Burgalés, PRB) was a regionalist political group in the province of Burgos during the Spanish Restoration period, founded by Antonio Zumárraga Díez.
