= Encasillado =

Electoral fraud system used during the Spanish Restoration

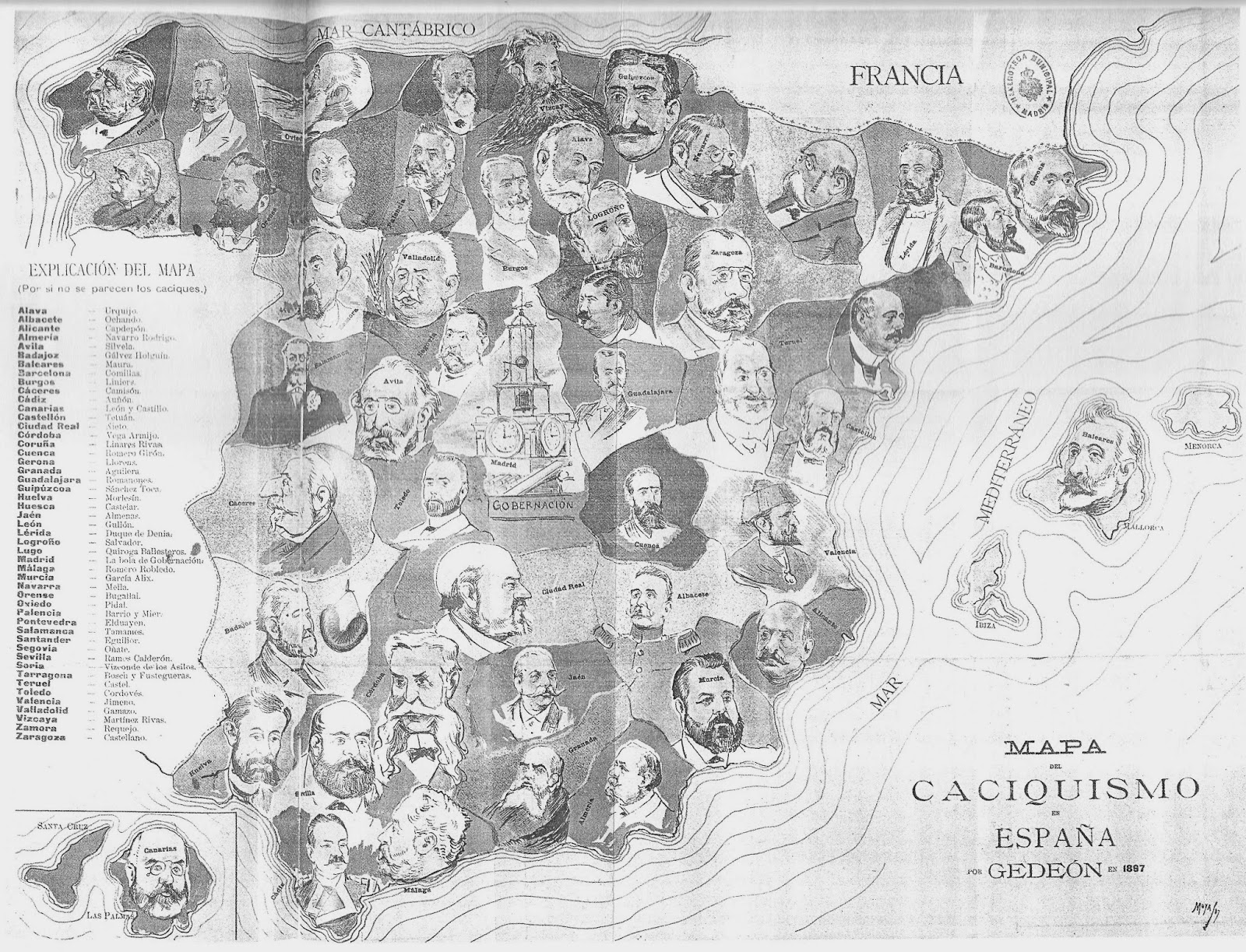
"Mapa del caciquismo en España", by Moya (1897). It shows the main deputies by province, whose seats were not negotiated in the encasillado, and who were the great caciques of the political regime of the Restoration.

The "encasillado" was the system used to assign the seats in the general elections of the Bourbon Restoration period in Spain before they were held. This ensured through electoral fraud that the seats would be as selected by the government and the wide cacique network spread throughout the territory. It was named as such because it was a matter of "fitting" (in Spanish: encajar, encasillar) the candidates of the two "parties of the day" (Conservative and Liberal) in the "grid of casillas" constituted by the more than 300 uninominal districts and the approximately one hundred seats of the 26 plurinominal constituencies. The person in charge of carrying out the "encasillado" was the Minister of the Interior of the incoming government, who thus ensured a comfortable majority in Parliament, since in the political regime of the Restoration the governments changed before the elections, and not after as in the parliamentary regimes (not fraudulent).

== Development ==
The encasillado was the first (and fundamental) step in the mechanism of electoral fraud that characterized the elections during the Bourbon Restoration in Spain ―and that the electoral system by uninominal districts greatly facilitated―. The objective was the peaceful distribution of seats between the "party of the day" that had just been given the task of forming a government by the Crown and the party that had governed until then and was now in opposition. The former obtained a comfortable majority of ministerial deputies in the Cortes and the latter a much smaller number of seats but enough to play its role of "loyal opposition" ―generally half a hundred―. Historian José Varela Ortega has defined encasillado as follows: "Literally, it is and meant the process by which "the Minister of the Interior manufactures the elections" by placing in casillas corresponding to each district the names of the candidates ―whether ministerial or opposition― that the government had decided to sponsor or tolerate".

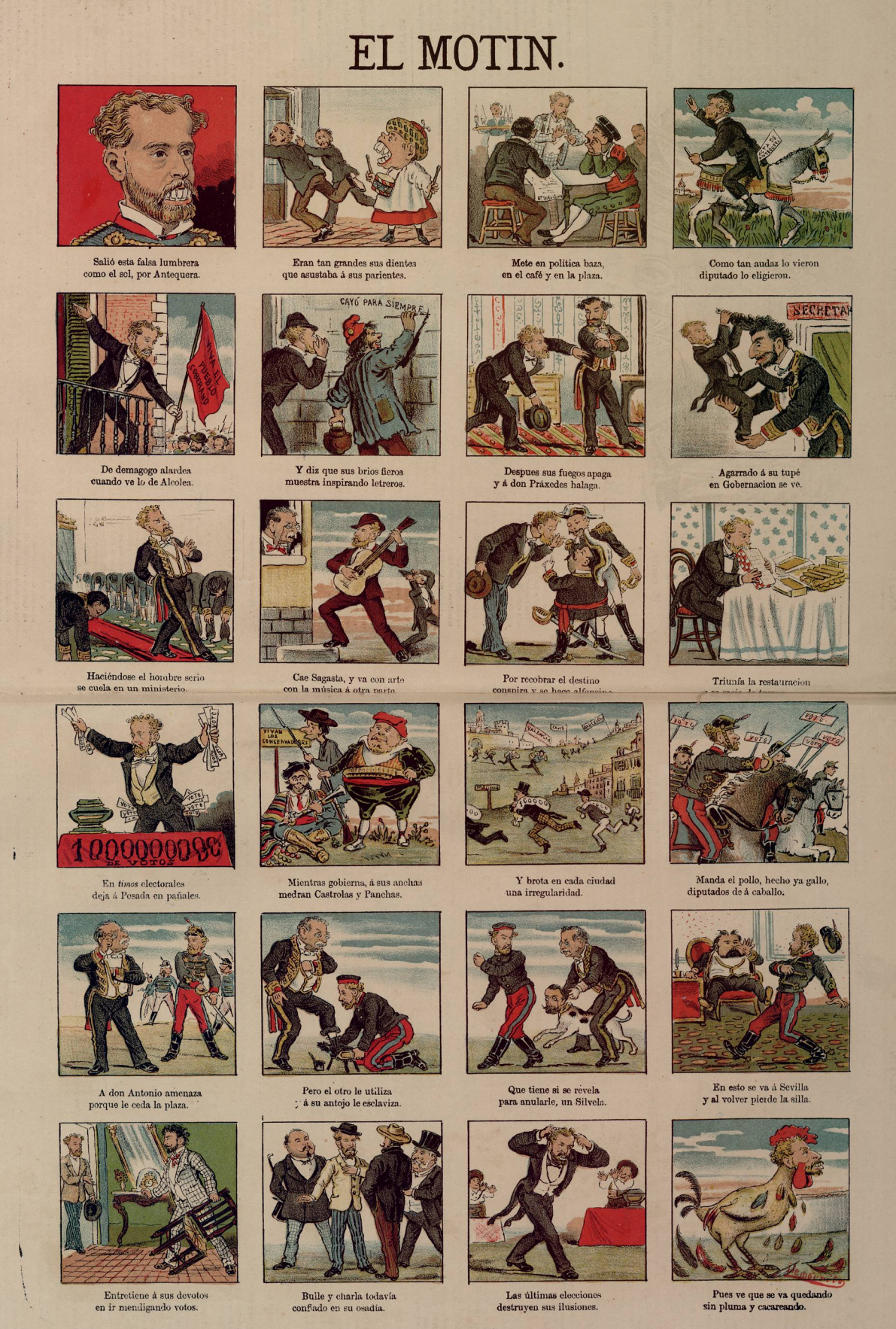
Caricature in the form of an auca about the political career of Francisco Romero Robledo, known as El Gran Elector, published on August 28, 1881, a few months after the fall of the Cánovas government of which he was the "skillful" Minister of the Interior. One of the couplets reads: "In electoral frauds / leave Posada in diapers".

The meeting to carry out the "encasillado" took place at the headquarters of the Ministry of Home Affairs, hence, as Varela Ortega has pointed out, "for the candidate, the election was decided in the corridors of the Ministry of Home Affairs". There the minister, who had become "the Great Elector" ―whose greatest exponent was Francisco Romero Robledo, who inherited the epithet of José Posada Herrera from the Elizabethan period, because like him he possessed an "extraordinary capacity to maneuver from the ministry and few scruples to do so, so that the results would be in accordance with the wishes of the Government and his own"―, agreed with the representative of the outgoing government party on the distribution of the districts, which also usually included those to be granted to non-dynastic parties ―for example, the governments always respected the seat of Gumersindo de Azcárate for León or that of the Carlist Matías Barrio y Mier for Cervera de Pisuerga―.

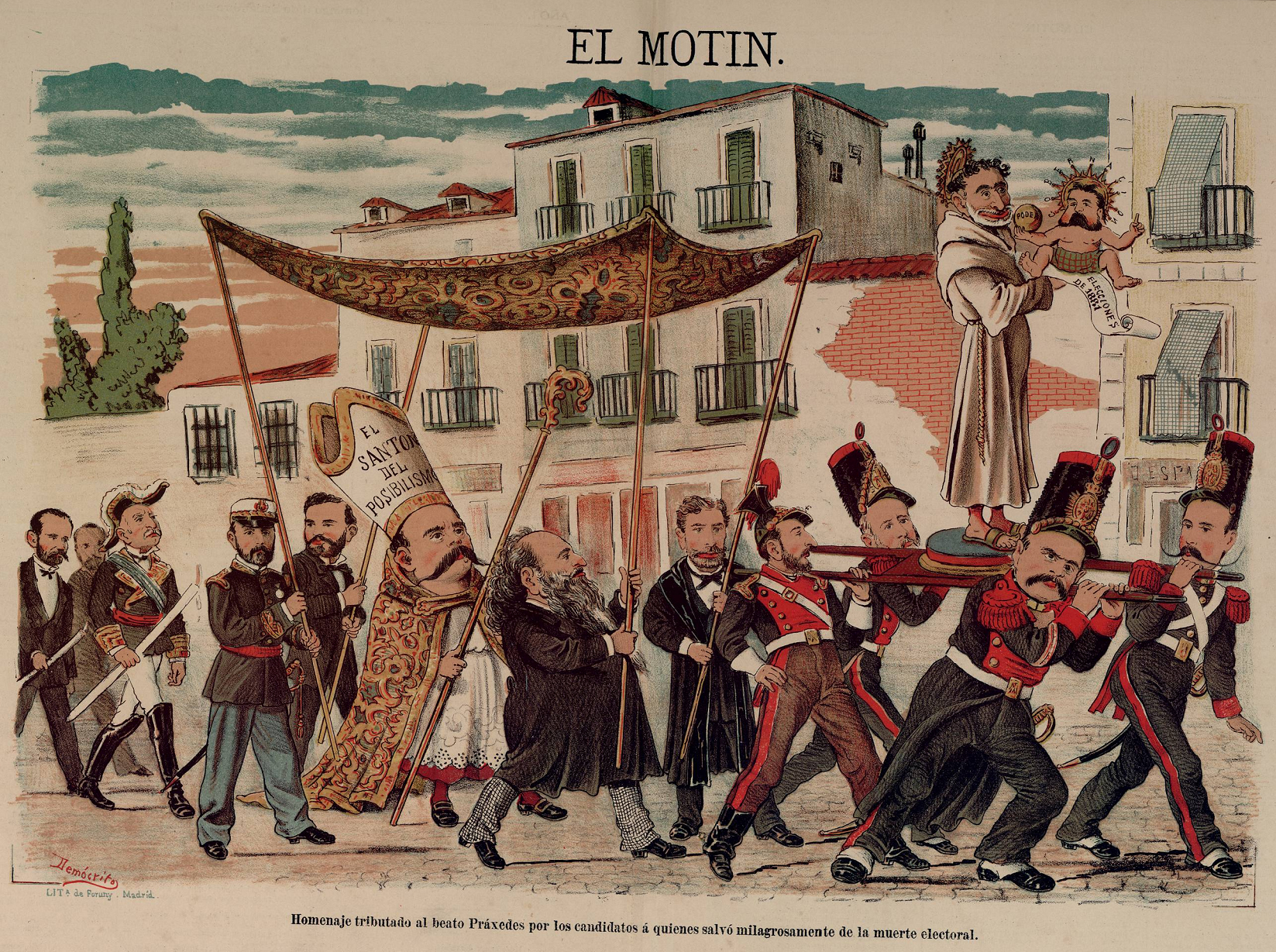
Caricature from El Motín entitled "Tribute to Blessed Praxedes by the candidates whom he miraculously saved from electoral death" (1881) and showing several elected deputies in procession (under a canopy and with the bishop's mitre the republican Emilio Castelar) behind the President of the Government Sagasta carried on a platform, who in turn carries in his arms the Minister of the Interior Venancio González, who is the one who actually worked the miracle.

The Minister of the Interior and the representative of the outgoing government decided ―although in the negotiations also intervened the caciques and the leaders of the factions of the parties― on the available districts ("docile", "dead" or "mostrencos"), whose candidates received the name of "cuneros" or "transhumantes" (the historian Carmelo Romero Salvador calls them "birds of passage") because they lacked roots in the same, while in principle the districts were left out of the distribution, in which a certain deputy, conservative or liberal, was guaranteed the election thanks to the clientelistic networks that he had carved out there ―thus becoming the local oligarch or great cacique―, so it was useless to present an alternative candidate because he would be defeated, although they did not stop trying if the one who occupied it was of the opposite party to that of the government. José Varela Ortega has called the deputies of these last districts "natural candidates, with roots or in their own right", and Carmelo Romero Salvador "hermit crabs" since, "just as those small crustaceans get into an empty shell from which it is very difficult to dislodge them, so they also took over the representation of a district becoming irremovable in it", thus constituting "lasting cacicatos, with the same deputy throughout several legislatures".

Romero Salvador pointed out that throughout the Restoration, the districts occupied by "hermit crabs" ―who repeated the same seat regardless of which party was in government― were increasing, with the consequent decrease of the "free" districts, which narrowed the governments' margin of maneuver to place the deputies in the "encasillado". "The proof of this lies in the fact that by always winning the elections the party that called them, the difference in seats with the other party became smaller and smaller throughout the first two decades of the 20th century".

This same historian has compiled a list of the deputies for the same district for ten or more times during the Restoration period, which totals 68: 32 conservatives and 32 liberals, plus three republicans (one of them Gumersindo de Azcárate for the district of León) and one independent Catholic (for the district of Zumaya). Among the conservatives Antonio Maura (nineteen times deputy uninterruptedly between 1891 and 1923 for the district of Palma de Mallorca), Francisco Romero Robledo (deputy during 21 legislatures for different districts) and Eduardo Dato (17 legislatures, twelve of them for the district of Murias de Paredes) stand out; and among the liberals José Canalejas (thirteen legislatures for different districts) and the Count of Romanones (seventeen uninterrupted legislatures for the district of Guadalajara). In addition, he has verified the existence of family dynasties of deputies such as those headed by Cánovas ―three brothers, four nephews, a brother-in-law and other brother-in-law were deputies―, by Sagasta ―a son, a son-in-law, a grandson and several uncles and cousins―, by Francisco Silvela ―two brothers, his father-in-law, his brothers-in-law and a nephew―, or by Antonio Maura ―three sons―. There were also deputies who "inherited" their parents' districts. The parliamentary chronicler of the conservative newspaper ABC Wenceslao Fernández Flórez wrote in 1916:

When we write these lines, that precept that the nation cannot be the patrimony of any family or person has not yet been violated. It is not yet, in fact, of a single family, but of four or five, who have sons, sons-in-law, uncles, cousins, nephews, grandchildren and brothers-in-law in all the positions and in all the Chambers.

Article 29 of the Electoral Law of 1907, promoted by the conservative Antonio Maura, simplified the "encasillado" by establishing that in those districts where only one candidate was presented, he would be elected without the need to vote (Carmelo Romero Salvador has highlighted the paradox of depriving some voters of the vote when the law for the first time in Spain established it as a duty and fined those who did not vote). Article 29 was in effect during the following seven elections and in these 734 seats, a quarter of the total, were covered by this system ―in 1916, called and won by the government of the liberal Count of Romanones, and in 1923, called and won by the government of the liberal Manuel García Prieto, a third of the deputies obtained their seats without going through the ballot box; "In both elections there were almost as many voters deprived of being able to exercise their vote (one million seven hundred thousand) as there were voters (two million) in those districts and constituencies in which there was an election"―. Carmelo Romero Salvador explained the widespread application of article 29 as follows: "Given that going to the polls always meant for parties and candidates, even when the election was assured, inconveniences, expenses and a greater dependence on the personal and collective requests of the voters, reaching agreements to avoid competition between them became a highly desirable objective".

== Bibliography ==
- Montero, Feliciano (1997). "La Restauración (1875-1885)". In Feliciano Montero; Javier Tusell (eds.). La Restauración. De la Regencia a Alfonso XIII (in Spanish). Volumen XI. Historia de España-Espasa. Madrid: Espasa-Calpe. pp. 1–188. ISBN 84-239-8959-3.
- Romero Salvador, Carmelo (2021). Caciques y caciquismo en España (1834-2020) (in Spanish). Prologue by Ramón Villares. Madrid: Los Libros de la Catarata. ISBN 978-84-1352-212-8.
- Varela Ortega, José (2001) [1977]. Los amigos políticos. Partidos, elecciones y caciquismo en la Restauración (1875-1900) (in Spanish). Prologue by Raymond Carr. Madrid: Marcial Pons. ISBN 84-7846-993-1.
