= Autonomist Republican Bloc =

Autonomist Republican Bloc Bloc Republicà Autonomista
- Founded: 1915
- Dissolved: 1917
- Split from: Republican Nationalist Federal Union
- Merged into: Catalan Republican Party
- Ideology: Republicanism; Catalanism

The Autonomist Republican Bloc (Catalan: Bloc Republicà Autonomista, BRA) was a Catalanist political party during the Spanish Restoration period, that existed between 1915 and 1917. It merged, together with the Republican Nationalist Federal Union (UFNR), into the Catalan Republican Party.

== Bibliography ==
- Noguer i Comet, Ramon (2000). "1913-1916: El Bloc Republicà Autonomista". In Publicacions de l'Abadia de Montserrat (ed.). Al llarg de la meva vida (in Catalan). Barcelona. ISBN 84-8415-203-0.
- Solé i Sabaté, Josep Maria; Villarroya, Joan (2003). "Lluís Companys i Jover". In Enciclopèdia Catalana (ed.). Història de la Generalitat de Catalunya i els seus President (in Catalan). Barcelona. ISBN 84-412-0885-9.
- Serrano Lahoz, Manuel (2020). Los partidos republicanos durante la Restauración (1874-1931) (PDF) (BA thesis) (in Spanish). University of Zaragoza.
