= Leguizamón =

Leguizamón is a surname. Notable people with the surname include:

- Aníbal Leguizamón (born 1992), Argentine footballer
- Baltazar Leguizamón (born 2000), Argentine racing driver
- Iván Leguizamón (born 2002), Paraguayan footballer
- Jimena Leguizamón (born 2005), Colombian swimmer
- José Leguizamón (born 1991), Paraguayan footballer
- Juan Manuel Leguizamón (born 1983), Argentine rugby player
- Leandro Leguizamón (born 1988), Argentine footballer
- Luciano Leguizamón (born 1982), Argentine footballer
- Luis Lezama Leguizamón Sagarminaga (1865–1933), Spanish industrialist and politician
- Manuel Lezama Leguizamón Sagarminaga (1862–1924), Spanish industrialist and politician
- María Leguizamón (born 1965), Argentine politician
- Mario Leguizamón (born 1982), Uruguayan footballer
- Martiniano Leguizamón (1858–1935), Argentine lawyer and writer
- Nicolás Leguizamón (born 1995), Argentine footballer
- Oscar Leguizamón (born 1966), Argentine footballer
- Pablo Leguizamón Arce (born 1982), Paraguayan footballer
- Sonia Álvarez Leguizamón (born 1954), Argentine sociologist and anthropologist
- Victoriano Leguizamón (1922–2007), Paraguayan footballer
