= Pedro Murúa =

Spanish field hockey player (1930–2019)

Olympic medal record

Men's field hockey

Representing Spain
Bronze medal – third place	1960 Rome	Team competition

Pedro Murúa Leguizamon (25 December 1930 – 4 November 2019) was a Spanish field hockey player who competed in the 1960 Summer Olympics. He was born in San Sebastián and died in the same city, and was the grandson of Basque industrialist and politician Luis Lezama Leguizamón.
