= Manuel Lezama Leguizamón Sagarminaga =

Spanish entrepreneur and politician (1862–1924)

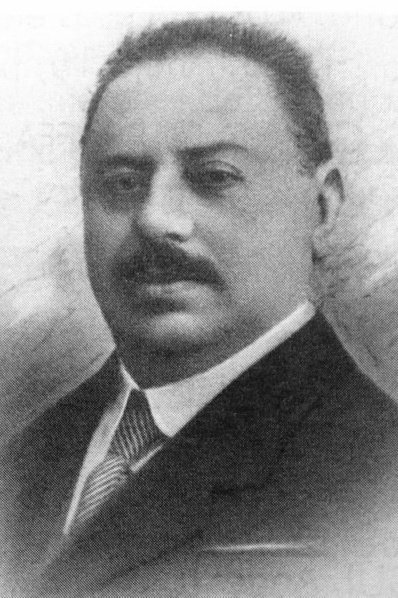
- Born: 1862; Bilbao, Spain
- Died: 1924 (aged 61–62); Bilbao, Spain
- Occupation: businessman
- Known for: business, politics
- Political party: Carlism

Marcos Sergio Bautista Manuel de Lezama Leguizamón Sagarminaga (1862–1924) was a Spanish entrepreneur and politician who developed the family-owned mining conglomerate that controlled iron ore, carbon, fluorite, anhydrite and plaster mines in Vascongadas and Asturias, and politically supported the Traditionalist cause. In the 1910s he led the Carlist provincial organisation in Biscay but in 1919 he joined the breakaway Mellistas. His political career climaxed in 1921–1923, when he served two terms in the Senate. In 1907–1911 he held a seat in the Biscay self-government Diputación Provincial, and in 1893–1897 he was a member of Bilbao town hall.

== Family and youth ==
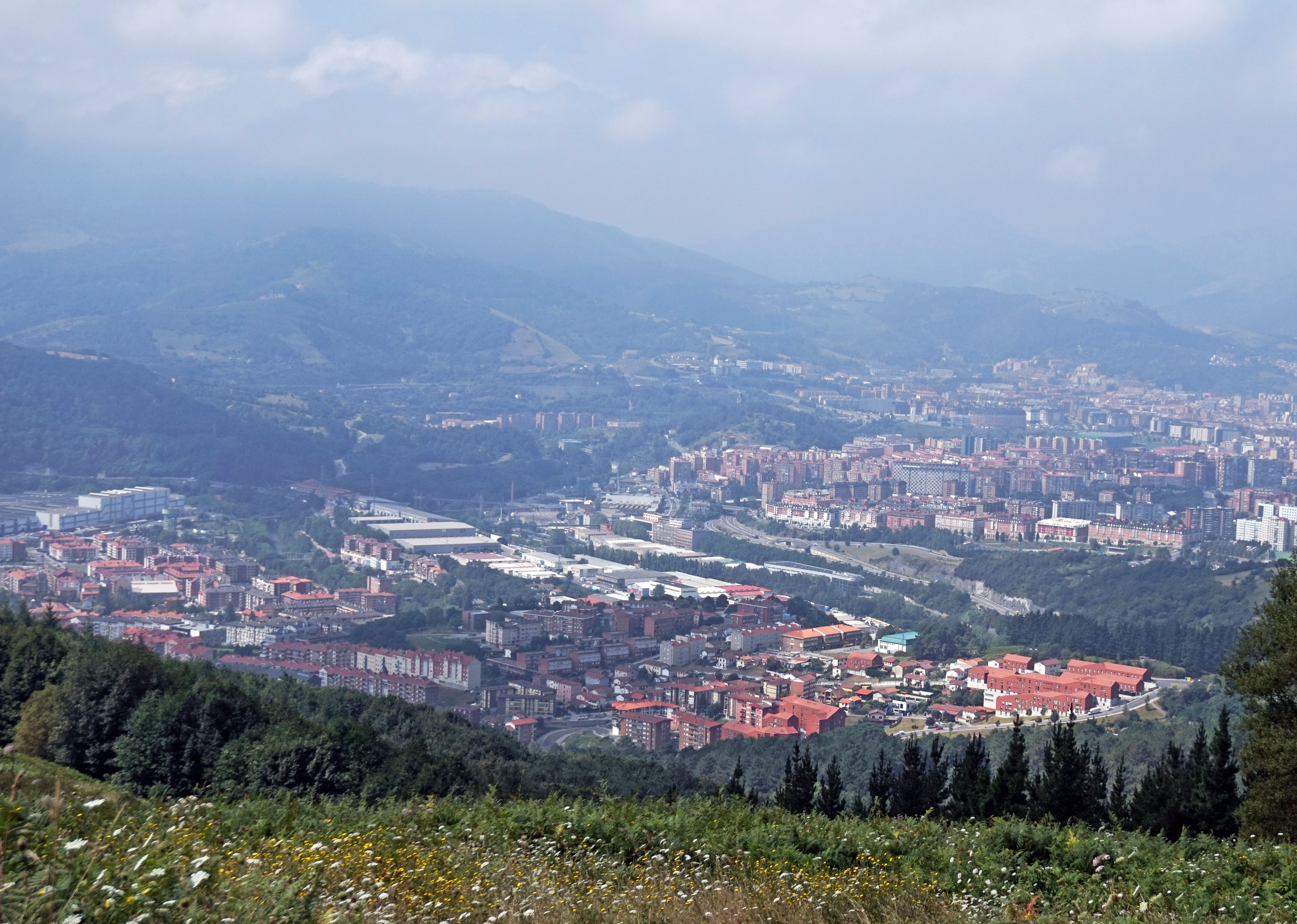
Etxebarri, the Leguizamon ancestral home (present view)

The Lezama family is among the oldest in Vascongadas, traced back to the 12th century; one branch settled in Biscay. Some of its representatives rose to high posts in Madrid; The Biscay branch, apart from having been among the largest landholders in the region, specialized as merchants and were army suppliers. The great-grandfather of Manuel, Juan Antonio de Lezama Jugo, was the first one to call himself Lezama Leguizamón; the surname incorporated the name of a related distinguished branch, which was about to extinguish. The grandfather of Manuel, Gregorio Lezama Leguizamón Eguia (1781–1857), was the one who transformed the family into business tycoons. Though one of the largest terratenientes in Biscay, he turned major protagonist of the industrial revolution in the province. Initially owner of an ironworks mill, he engaged in industrial-scale iron mining, made possible thanks to the introduction of Bessemer converters and the richest vein of iron ore in Europe, located in Biscay. In the mid-19th century he obtained a number of mining concessions and in the 1850s formed an emergent new social class of industrial moguls.

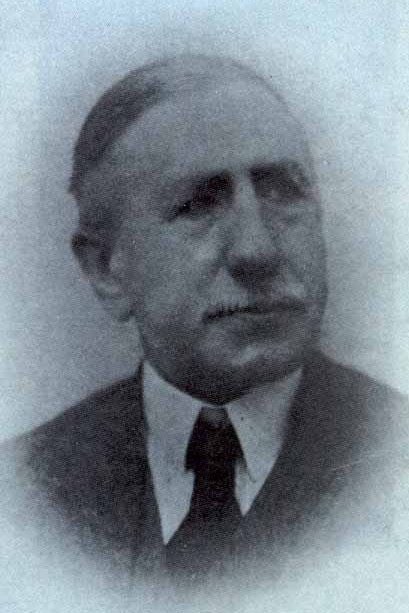
brother Luis Lezama Leguizamón Sagarminaga

The youngest son of Gregorio, Manuel Lezama Leguizamón Aldama (1817–1884), inherited part of the family business and developed it further on. He kept obtaining new mining concessions, (Note: The first note on Lezama Leguizamón Aldama obtaining new licenses comes from the 1860s, when he was concessioned to exploit the Nuestra Señora de Begoña mine. The last note is from the early 1880s, when he got a concession to exploit the Acebal mine near Baracaldo,) counted among “destacados miembros de las élites bilbaína” and owned one of the most successful industrial conglomerates in Biscay. He married María Concepción Sagarminaga Zabala, descendant to a less affluent, but prestigious Basque family. (Note: She was daughter to the sister of Juan Mateo de Zabala Zabala, who in turn married Juan Manuel de Sagarminaga.) The couple had two sons, (Note: Manuel and Luis at times get confused in historiography.) Manual born as the older one. Nothing is known about his early education; later he was prepared to take over the family business and at an unspecified time, though most likely in the early 1880s, he studied law and was later referred to as "abogado". Following the death of their father, Manuel and Luis set up Hijos de Lezama Leguizamón company, which owned the family business; (Note: The company Hijos de Lezama Leguizamón was active at least since 1895.) The brothers inherited 101 hectares (250 acres), most of which went to Manuel.

In 1892 Manuel married María de la Soledad Ampuero y del Río (1871).-1938). She was daughter to a landholder and Carlist politician, longtime member of the provincial diputacion and a Biscay personality, José María Ampuero Jáuregui, also heiress to 530 hectares (1,300 acres) in Biscay. The couple initially settled at the Lezama estate in Etxebarri, which was eventually inherited by Manuel. Later they moved to Calle de Estufa in Bilbao, (Note: They also had a house at Calle Sombretería.) though they used to spend summers at the Ampuero estate in Durango. They had no children. (Note: None of numerous necrological notes, which meticulously listed all relatives, mentioned any children.) The best-known of Manuel's relatives was his younger brother Luis Lezama Leguizamón Sagarminaga, who was also an entrepreneur who in the early 1930s served as the provincial Carlist leader in Biscay. (Note: Within the Carlist heterogeneous regional executive network Lezama Leguizamón acted as Delegado Regio para el Señorio de Vizcaya; he was also a member of Junta Suprema Vasco Navarra (representing Biscay; other members were Oriol, Rodezno and Olazabal)) Manuel's nephews served as requeté during the Civil War and Fernando Lezama Leguizamón Zuazola was active in Carlism until the late 1960s. (Note: In 1967 the Huguista leader Zavala turned to him when in need of money.) Manuel's brother-in-law, José Joaquín Ampuero y del Río, was a Basque business tycoon and Traditionalist politician.

== Entrepreneur ==
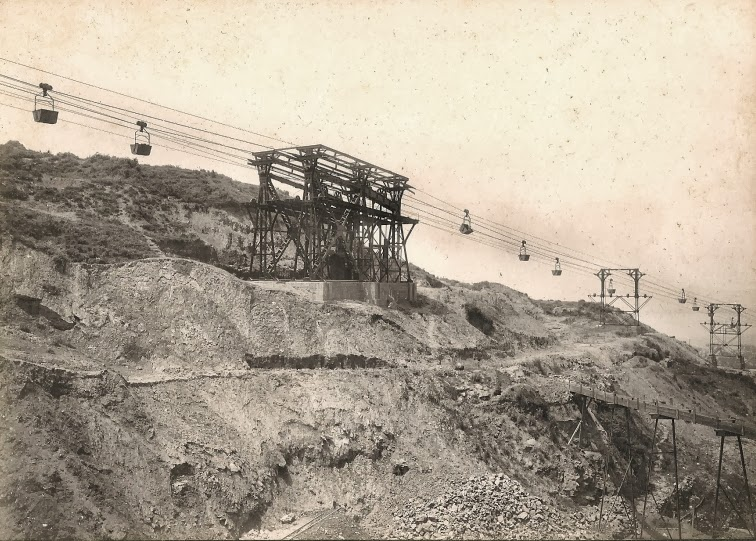
opencast iron ore mine, Biscay

With his brother Luis, Manuel was co-owner of Hijos de Lezama Leguizamón-Negocios de Minería, the company that owned the inherited business; it consisted of opencast iron ore mines in Etxebarri and Ollargan. Until the late 1890s, the Lezamas were granted five more mining licenses; three were in the Bilbao area, one in Gueñes and one in Triano. and ranked as sixth-most successful concessionaires in Biscay. At the end of the 19th century, they attempted to restructure their mining portfolio; in 1895 the brothers sold Sociedad Coto Minero de Ollargan. and in the early 1900s, they received the first anthracite mining concessions in Asturias. In 1903 the Lezamas requested (and obtained) concession for a mine named Demasía a Colunga in Asturias, in the Carrandi area. Apart from new licenses in Biscay, in the 1910s the Lezamas obtained further concessions in Asturias. In 1915 the Lezamas were noted expoiting another mine, Encarnación, near Carrandi. along with coal, they also mined fluorites, plaster and anhydrite deposits.

At one time, the Lezamas operated 15 mines in Biscay for "Carmen" see. Mines named "Bienvenidas", "Segundo Esteban", "Lanillos" and "Regato" were located an unclear areas of Biscay, and Asturias. The last note of the mine having been exploited by Lezama comes from 1924,"Encarnación" was operated since 1915, "Ribadesella" also from 1915, "Felisa" from 1916, the jewel in the crown was "Abandonada", an iron ore opencast pit in Miribilla. Some mines were equipped with transportation systems or washeries that provided services to competitive companies; part of their infrastructure was so advanced it gained scientific articles. It is estimated the Lezama conglomerate accounted for 5–6% of the Biscay iron ore production, and even during the World War I crisis it produced 110–122 thousand tons. In the 1920s, when the Biscay mining was undergoing transformation, and family-held companies were being replaced with bank ownership, the Lezamas held firm. For decades engaged in lawsuits against municipal authorities, The Lezamas had many differences with the city councils of Bilbao and Getxo, and were subject to legal investigation as far as in Britain.

Lezama engaged in numerous other initiatives. He was among stakeholders of La Robla, a new railway line that linked Bilbao with León and Palencia; Since the mid-1890s, during at least 20 years he was sitting in the executive board of the company. In the 1910s, he was involved in engineering projects related to regulation of the Nervion River, vital for iron ore transportation and exploitation. He held a seat in Consejo de Administracion of Banco de Comercio de Bilbao and in line with the rotating presidency scheme, periodically presided over this body, e.g. in 1899. At least since the 1910s he was executive of Banco de Bilbao an held its rotating presidency during numerous periods between 1915 and 1924. He also engaged in Sociedad Hispano-Portugesa de Transportes Eléctricos. Lezama was one of the co-founders and one of 12 members of the executive council, and in Martiartu S.A., a maritime shipping enterprise. The Lezamas invested also in construction works in Canada.

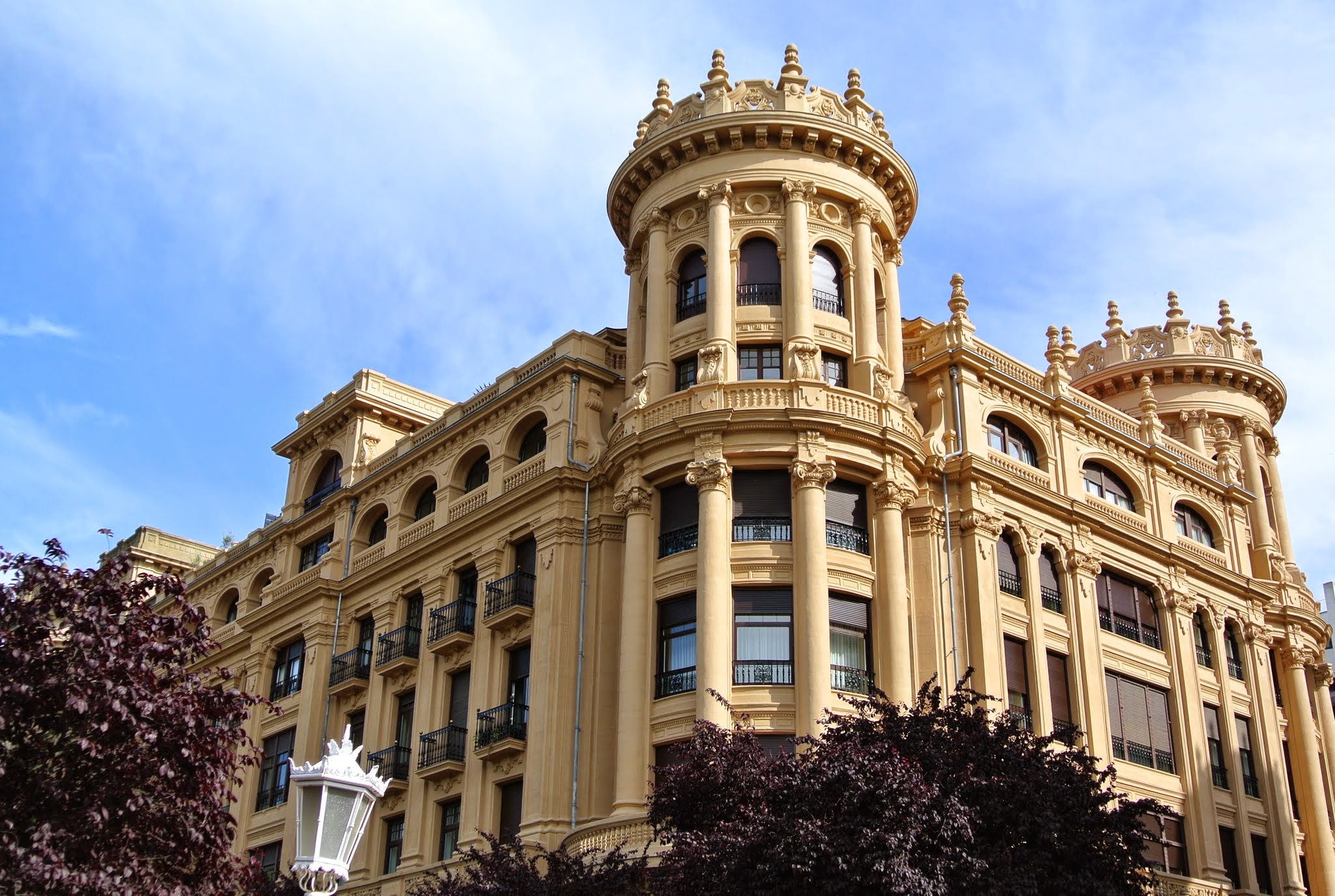
Casa Lezama-Leguizamón, Bilbao

The Lezama Leguizamóns are not counted among the very top elite of Biscay industrial tycoons formed by the Ybarra, Martínez Rivas, Chávarri, Sota and Echevarrieta families; however, they are listed as members of the emergent Basque oligarchy; their name repeatedly appears in the history of Biscay industrialization and their companies are listed among the most important in Bilbao in the first decades of the 20th century. Their wealth and position was demonstrated by Casa Lezama-Leguizamón in downtown Bilbao, which was home to numerous corporate and other institutions. It is considered an iconic example of Biscay architecture that was made possible by the fortunes of the new industrial and financial oligarchy.

== Consejal and diputado (1890s and 1900s) ==
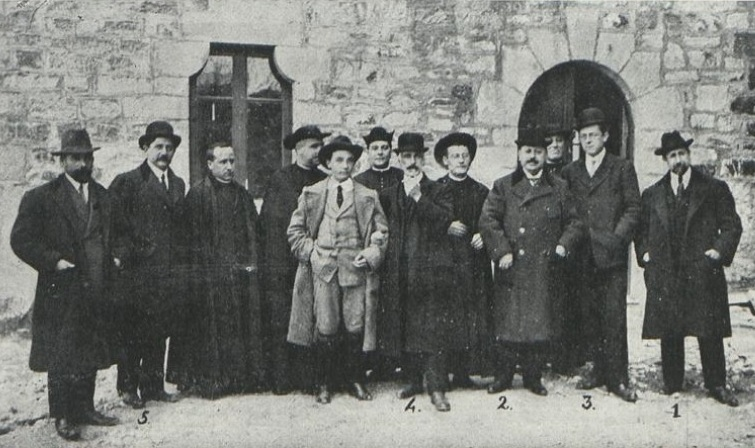
Lezama (3fR) during construction of San Esteban church in Etxebarri

Lezama's paternal grandfather was a militant Liberal (Note: Gregorio Lezama Leguizamón Eguia moved from the early “exaltado” wing of the Liberals to a somewhat less radical “fuerista” faction later on.) who vehemently opposed the Carlists, (Note: He was alcalde segundo and then alcalde primero of Bilbao in the 1810s, Jefe Político of Biscay 1837–1839 and corregidor de Vizcaya in the late 1830s.) while his father did not engage in politics. (Note: The only public post identified, held by Manuel, was this of Consultor suplente del Señorío de Vizcaya in the early 1860s.) Hence, it is unclear how Manuel and Luis got involved in the movement. (Note: Monographic study on Basque Carlism in the 19th century does not list the names of Lezama or Leguizamón a single time. However, some press sources claimed the cousin of Manuel and Luis served in the legitimist ranks as capitán de Guías del Rey and was killed during the Third Carlist War.) There is no information on Lezama's political engagements during his youth; the first one known was the 1892 honeymoon trip, when the couple travelled to Venice to pay homage to Carlos VII. When running for the Bilbao city council in 1893 he stood as a Traditionalist candidate from the Old Town district and was comfortably elected; at least since 1894 he served as one of deputy-mayors. In the ayuntamiento Lezama was looking after the Bilbao Vieja area; he formed part of Comisión de Gobierno Interior and Comisión de Industrias, and was a member of Junta Municipal de Estadística and Junta de las Salas-Cunas y Asilo de Huérfanos. His term as consejero and teniente de alcalde lasted 4 years and in 1897 he was already absent in municipal government, though it is not clear whether Lezama failed in elections or decided not to stand.

In 1901 the Lezama brothers co-launched La Gaceta del Norte; it was part of the Catholic counter-offensive against the rising secularization tide and adhered to the “unity of all Catholics” platform, at the time advocated by the hierarchy. The newspaper mounted “oposición a ultranza” versus the liberal policy of Canalejas government, especially against the Ley de Asociaciones. At least until the late 1910s the Lezama brothers were key owners of La Gaceta, though it was rather Luis who remained in the executive of the company. Other cultural activities include support for Basque cultural initiatives, e.g. during a rally at Frontón Euskalduna, co-founding of Catholic schools in Etxebarri and financial contribution to construction of the new church in the district. His clearly Traditionalist political engagements were sporadic; in 1903 he hosted the party theorist Vázquez de Mella, in 1906 he sent an open telegraph message to the Carlist infant Don Jaime, the same year he funded prizes for the local Carlist literary competition, and in 1907 he presided over a small party rally in Bilbao.

Carlist standard

In 1907 Lezama decided to run for the local Biscay self-government, Diputación Provincial. The Carlists formed an alliance named Coalición Católica, joined also by the Basque nationalists and the Integrists; the list emerged triumphant and Lezama was elected. Apart from vague anecdotic information there is no systematic data on his tenure and role in diputación. He remained active in the Carlist ranks, e.g. in 1909 the brothers attended the funeral of Carlos VII; at least since this year Lezama was a member of Junta Señoral, the provincial party executive, and took part in local rallies, but it is not clear whether and how political preferences filtered to his official tasks. The term expired in 1911 and Lezama was reported to stand in forthcoming elections to get his ticket renewed; it is not clear whether he failed or withdrew, but he was absent in the re-elected self-government.

== Mellista and senador (1910s and 1920s) ==
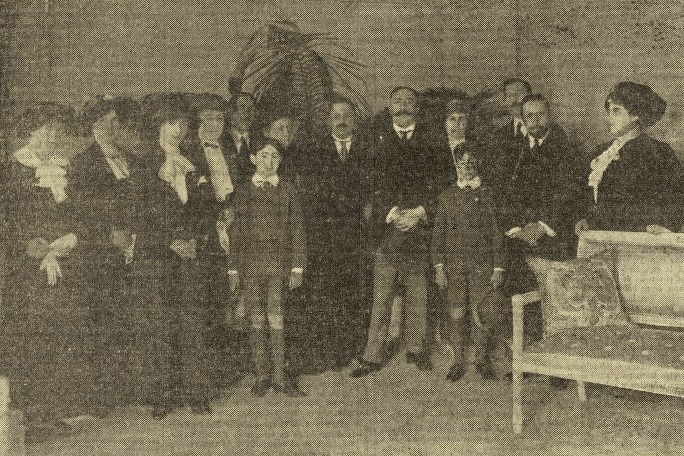
Don Jaime and the families of Manuel and Luis Lezama Leguizamón, 1913

From 1913, Lezama was president of Junta Legitimista de Vizcaya, the provincial Carlist executive. (Note: This is how he was referred to in a press note, dwelling on his trip to Paris.) The same year, together with his brother Luis and both families, he travelled to Paris to pay homage to the new Carlist king, Don Jaime. His understanding of the leadership role was rather traditional; Lezama presided over local feasts like Velada Jaimista in Durango, attended banquets to honor party leaders, e.g. in 1914 to hail the Vascongadas jefe Tirso de Olazabal, and entertained Carlist royals when visiting Biscay, e.g. in 1917 hosting princesses Fabiola and Nieves in Bilbao. (Note: The females referred to are probably the sisters Fabiola and Maria Massimo y Borbon, at the time respectively 17 and 15 years old, granddaughters to the late Carlist king Carlos VII.) He was not engaged beyond his native province and is not listed in historiographic works dealing with general Carlist policy in Spain in the early 20th century. (Note: A lengthy monographical work on nationwide Carlist politics at the turn of the centuries does not mention Lezama a single time, compare Agustín Fernández Escudero.)

At least since the early 1900s Lezama remained on friendly terms with de Mella. Throughout the 1910s a few times he hosted the theorist in Bilbao; in some cases these visits produced security concerns on the part of the administration, and Civil Guard was deployed to prevent any unrest. In 1916, Lezama drove de Mella from Biscay to Asturias; both were to attend the Battle of Covadonga anniversary. When in the mid-1910s the movement was increasingly paralyzed by the conflict between de Mella and Don Jaime, the Lezamas sided with the former due to their personal relationship and because they have been always inclined towards broader political alliances promoted by de Mella. (Note: The group of promellista dissenters in the Jaimist Biscay ranks was known as La Pińa, ridiculed by orthodox Jaimistas as "piñosos con boinas".) The conflict erupted in 1919, when following a showdown of January–February, the Mellistas decided to secede and form their own organization. The Lezamas joined the rebels, (Note: Lezama's later obituary claimed, however, that he had been always "fírme en sus convicciones políticas".) known as the Mellistas. In Biscay, the dissenters were led by José Joaquín Ampuero and Ignacio Gardeazábal; Lezama joined the provincial Mellista executive.

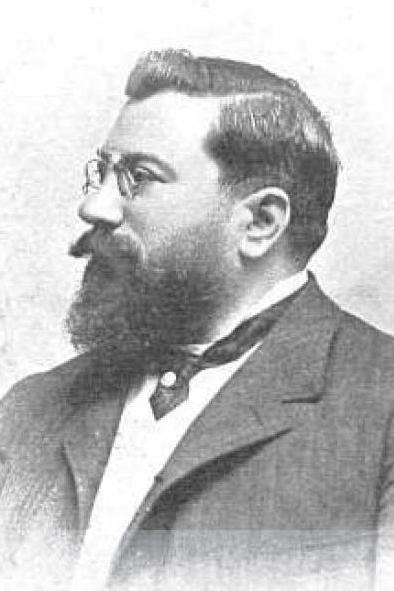
Juan Vázquez de Mella

In 1920 Lezama co-founded an alliance named Liga Monárquica, which was supposed to field its candidates during the campaign to the Senate. Initially it was de Mella himself listed but for unknown reasons he withdrew and was replaced with Lezama. In 1921 all monarchical candidates were comfortably elected. (Note: all three candidates received 104 votes each.) Little is known of Lezama's activity in the upper chamber of the parliament; the Senate record does not contain any trace of his labors. Lezama's term was very brief because the legislature was soon dissolved. During the following campaign of 1923, the Liga Monárquica alliance was renewed and in Biscay, it again won; apart from Lezama, it included a Conservative and a Romanonista candidates, though Lezama was the most-voted one. (Note: Lezama collected 201 votes, the Conservative candidate 102 and the Romanonista contender 96.) His second term was even shorter; the Primo de Rivera coup caused the dissolution of the Cortes. In 1924, the Lezama brothers co-signed a manifesto that pledged support to the dictator, though they declared no Traditionalist could accept the 1876 constitution as basis for further action, they nevertheless recommended entering Unión Patriótica. (Note: The Lezama brothers and José Ampuero recommended every Traditionalist UP, "having watched with sympathy the movement of September 13", joins Union Patriotica.)

== See also ==
- Traditionalism
- Carlism
- Mellismo
- Luis Lezama Leguizamón Sagarminaga
- Casa Lezama-Leguizamon
