= Sonia Álvarez Leguizamón =

Argentinian anthropologist

- Born: 16 January 1954 (age 72)
- Education: Catholic University of Santa Maria; University of Seville
- Scientific career
- Fields: Sociology and Anthropology
- Workplaces: National University of Salta

Sonia Álvarez Leguizamón (16 January 1954, Salta) is an Argentine sociologist and anthropologist. She earned a bachelor's degree in social work from the Catholic University of Santa Maria, and a master's degree in Development Sociology from the National University of Cordoba. She earned her Ph.D. at the University of Seville in Social and Cultural Anthropology. Alvarez Leguizamón was the University of Salta as the Dean of the Faculty of Humanities and as the Director of the Masters programme in Social Policy. Alvarez Leguizamón has also worked extensively with Comparative Research Programme on Poverty (CROP) for the last fifteen years on issues relating to their organization and to El Consejo Latinoamericano de Ciencias Sociales (CLACSO). Along with writing her own research, Alvarez Leguizamón has also served as an editor for the second edition of CROP's Glossary of Poverty.

== Biography ==
Alvarez Leguizamón is known for her work on poverty. She specializes in issues of urban anthropology at the regional level, working in academic and scientific activities, as an associate professor in the Faculty of Humanities at the National University of Salta where she has also served as Director of the Masters Programme in Social Policy.

Her research include topics on Argentina's social policies and history; history of the production processes of poverty and development in Latin America; as well as analysis of human development in the biopolitics debate as part of the neoliberal governmental construction and production of inequality and poverty. She has served as chief researcher in various projects such as CIUNSa, CONICET, AECI, and UNESCO.

== Selected works ==
Among her publications are:

- Trabajo y producción de la pobreza en Latinoamérica y el Caribe: estructuras, discursos y actores (2005)
- Pobreza y desarrollo en América Latina. El caso de Argentina (2008)
  - This book focuses on poverty as a socially constructed problem and analyzes it with respect to Latin America. It includes reviews on social policies, focusing on hygiene and development, that were implemented in the former half of the 20th century that were meant to aid the poor.
- La producción de la pobreza masiva y su persistencia en el pensamiento social latinoamericano en Cimadamore y Cattani (CLACSO Co ediciones, Siglo del Hombre Editores)
- La transformación de las instituciones de reciprocidad y control, del don al capital social y de la "biopolítica" a la "focopolítica” (2002)
- Focopolitica y gubernamentalidad neoliberal, las políticas sociales en Bertololotto y Lastra “Políticas públicas y pobreza en el escenario post 2002” (2008)
- Neoliberal and Neo-Colonial Governmentality, social policies and Strategies against poverty (from the North,), alternatives from the South (The case of South America and the Caribbean) en prensa en Puyana & Samwel “Strategies Against Poverty: Designs from the North and Alternatives from the South”
- Biopolíticas neoliberales y focopolítica en América Latina, los programas de transferencia condicionadas en prensa en Barba
- Inequality and social policies: between OECD view and Neo colonialism and coloniality of the present
- Representations of poverty in the hegemonic press in Argentina: Clarín, La Nación and La Voz del Interior
- The 'fight against poverty' and Human Development discourse in the context of International Cooperation for " development
