= Oscar Leguizamón =

Argentine footballer

Personal information
- Full name: Oscar Rodolfo Leguizamón
- Date of birth: 30 March 1966 (age 60)
- Place of birth: Rosario, Argentina
- Position: Defender

Senior career*
Years	Team	Apps	(Gls)
1987–1989	Central Córdoba	61	(1)
1989–1990	Belgrano	34	(1)
1990–1991	Maipú	16	(0)
1991–1994	Unión Santa Fe	59	(20)
1994–1998	Antofagasta		
1998–1999	Urquiza	15	(0)
Total		185	(22)
- * Club domestic league appearances and goals

Oscar Rodolfo Leguizamón (born 30 March 1966) is an Argentine former professional footballer who played as a defender.

== Career ==
Central Córdoba of Primera B Nacional were Leguizamón's first club, he made sixty-one appearances with them between 1987 and 1989. Spells with fellow second-tier teams Belgrano and Deportivo Maipú followed, prior to Leguizamón joining Argentine Primera División side Unión Santa Fe. He played twenty-three times in Argentina's professional top-flight during 1991–92, a season that ended in relegation. Leguizamón scored twenty goals in thirty-six games back in Primera B Nacional, that led to him leaving Argentine football for the first time as he left to join Chilean Primera División team Deportes Antofagasta in 1994.

He suffered relegation in his final season, 1997, with Antofagasta before returning to Argentina to join his final club, Justo Jose de Urquiza of Primera C.

== Personal life ==
He is the father of current footballer Nicolás Leguizamón.
