= Nicolás Leguizamón =

Argentine footballer

Personal information
- Date of birth: 26 January 1995 (age 31)
- Place of birth: Santa Fe, Argentina
- Height: 1.80 m (5 ft 11 in)
- Position: Forward

Team information
- Current team: Deportivo Cuenca
- Number: 9

Youth career
- Colón

Senior career*
| Years | Team | Apps | (Gls) |
| 2016–2022 | Colón | 75 | (10) |
| 2020–2021 | → Defensa y Justicia (loan) | 9 | (2) |
| 2022–2023 | Central Córdoba SdE | 11 | (0) |
| 2024 | Colón | 13 | (2) |
| 2024–2025 | Juventud | 19 | (3) |
| 2025– | Deportivo Cuenca | 4 | (1) |
- * Club domestic league appearances and goals as of 15 September 2024

Nicolás Leguizamón (born 26 January 1995) is an Argentine professional footballer who plays as a forward for Ecuadorian Serie A club Deportivo Cuenca.

== Career ==
Leguizamón began with Argentine Primera División side Colón in 2016. He made his first-team debut in a Santa Fe derby on 23 April against Unión Santa Fe. In total, he made five appearances in the 2016 season but failed to score. He scored his first league goal for Colón in the following season, on 3 December, versus Huracán.

== Personal life ==
He is the son of former footballer Oscar Leguizamón.

== Career statistics ==
As of 21 May 2018.

Club statistics
| Club | Season | League | | | Cup (Note: Includes the Copa Argentina) | | League Cup | | Continental (Note: Includes the Copa Sudamericana) | | Other | | Total | |
| Club | Season | Division | Apps | Goals | Apps | Goals | Apps | Goals | Apps | Goals | Apps | Goals | Apps | Goals |
|---|---|---|---|---|---|---|---|---|---|---|---|---|---|---|
| Colón | 2016 | Primera División | 5 | 0 | 1 | 0 | — | | — | | 0 | 0 | 6 | 0 |
| Colón | 2016–17 | Primera División | 21 | 5 | 1 | 0 | — | | — | | 1 | 1 | 23 | 6 |
| Colón | 2017–18 | Primera División | 13 | 1 | 1 | 0 | — | | 1 (Note: One appearance in 2018 Copa Sudamericana) | 0 | 1 | 0 | 16 | 1 |
| Career total | | | 39 | 6 | 3 | 0 | — | | 1 | 0 | 2 | 1 | 45 | 7 |
