= Luis Lezama Leguizamón Sagarminaga =

Spanish entrepreneur and politician

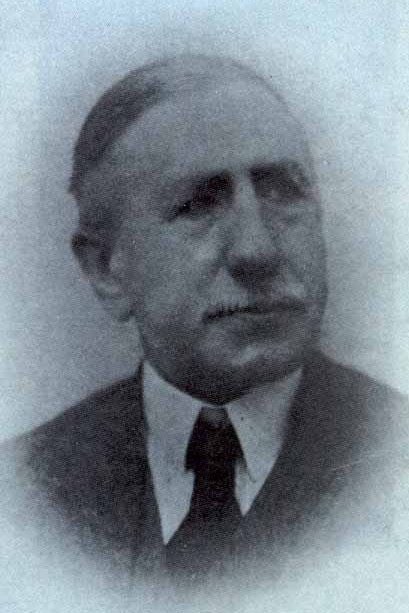
- Born: 1865; Bilbao, Spain
- Died: 1933 (aged 67–68); San Sebastián, Spain
- Occupation: businessman
- Known for: business, politics
- Political party: Carlism

Luis Dionisio de Lezama Leguizamón y Sagarminaga (1865–1933) was a Spanish entrepreneur, Vascologist and politician. As a businessman he kept developing the family-owned mining conglomerate, which controlled part of iron ore, carbon, fluorite, anhydrite and plaster exploitation in Vascongadas and Asturias. As a linguist he was a longtime executive of Sociedad de Estudios Vascos, owned one of the largest collections of Basque literature and contributed few scientific works himself. As a politician he supported the Traditionalist cause, first as a Carlist, in 1919–1931 as a breakaway Mellista, and then again as a Carlist; in the early 1930s he held the provincial party jefatura in Biscay.

== Family and youth ==
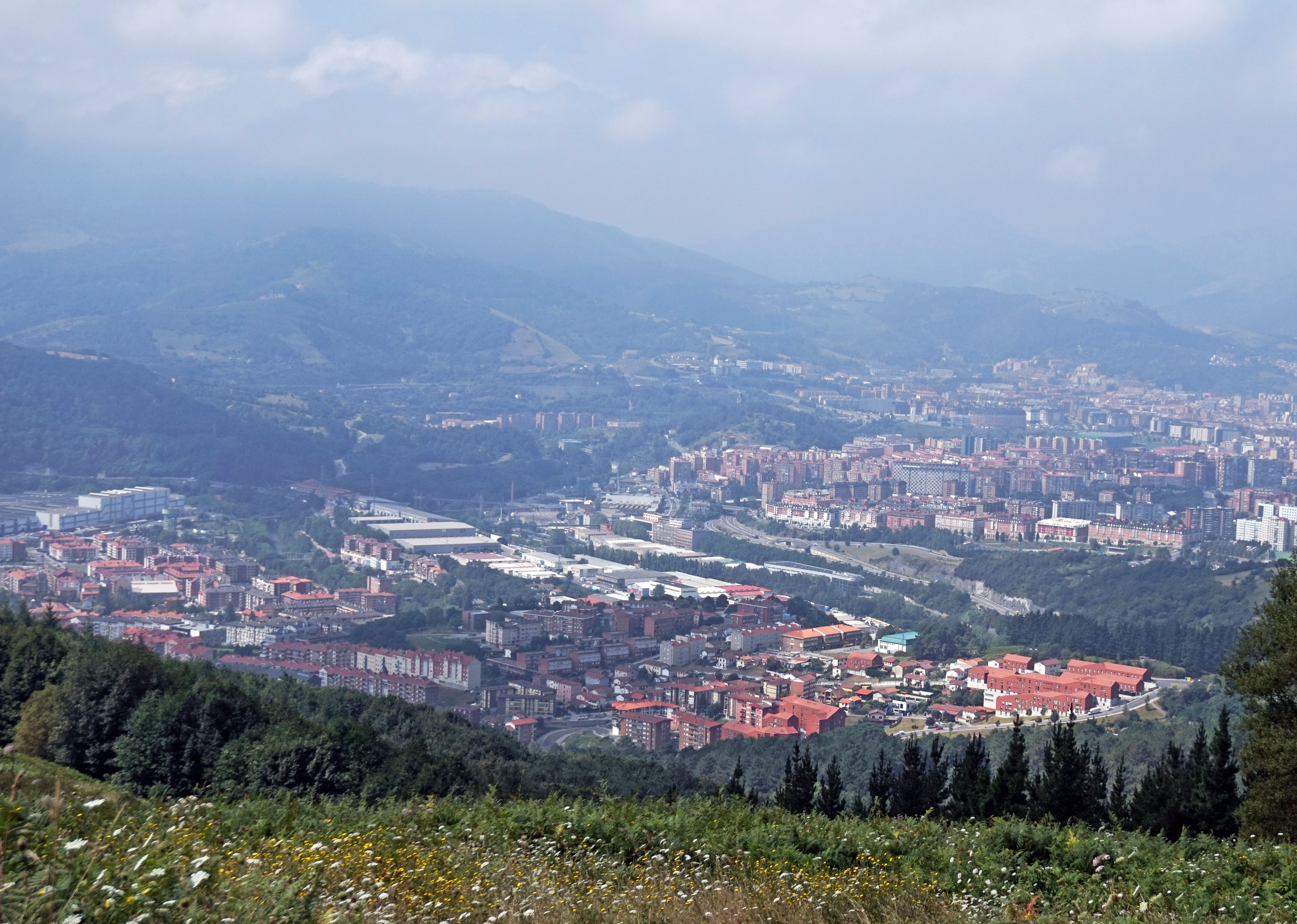
Etxebarri, the Leguizamon ancestral home (present view)

The Lezama family is among the oldest in Vascongadas, traced back to the 12th century; one branch settled in Biscay. Some of its representatives rose to high posts in Madrid; the Biscay branch, apart from having been among largest landholders in the region, specialized as merchants and were army suppliers. The great-grandfather of Luis, Juan Antonio de Lezama Jugo, was the first one to call himself Lezama Leguizamón; the surname incorporated the name of a related distinguished branch, which was about to extinguish. The grandfather of Luis, Gregorio Lezama Leguizamón Eguia (1781–1857), was the one who transformed the family into business tycoons. Though one of the largest terratenientes in Biscay, he turned major protagonist of industrial revolution in the province. Initially owner of an ironworks mill, he engaged in industrial-scale iron mining, made possible thanks to introduction of Bessemer converters and the richest vein of iron ore in Europe, located in Biscay. In the mid-19th century he obtained a number of mining concessions and in the 1850s formed an emergent new social class of industrial moguls.

The youngest son of Gregorio, Manuel Lezama Leguizamón Aldama (1817-1884), inherited part of the family business and developed it further on. He kept obtaining new mining concessions, counted among "destacados miembros de las élites bilbaína" and owned one of the most successful industrial conglomerates in Biscay. He married María Concepción Sagarminaga Zabala, descendant to a less affluent, but prestigious Basque family. The couple had 2 sons, Luis born as the younger one. Nothing is known about his early education; later he was prepared to take over the family business and at unspecified time, though most likely in the late 1880s, he studied engineering in Barcelona. Following the death of their father, Manuel and Luis set up Hijos de Lezama Leguizamón company, which owned the family business; Luis inherited also 13 ha between Begoña and Etxebarri, plus 7 ha in Gipuzkoa.

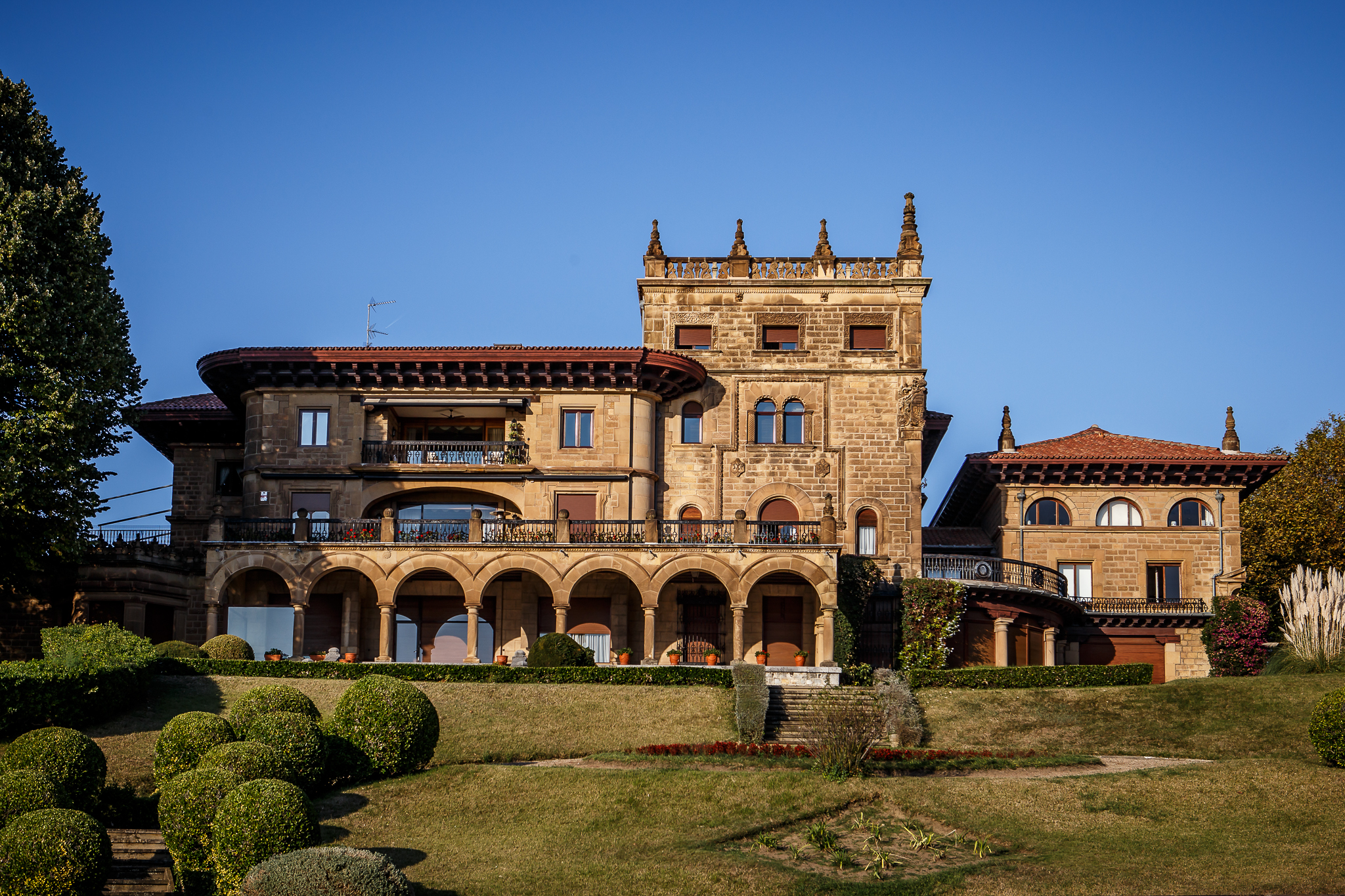
Palacio Lezama-Leguizamon, Getxo

In 1894, Luis married Felicia Zuazola Escuza (1875–1958), descendant to a noble Gipuzkoan family. The couple settled at the Lezama estate in Etxebarri, but in the early 20th century Luis purchased from his cousin a residential building in Getxo, later re-modeled and to be known as Palacio Lezama Leguizamón. The couple had 7 children, born between 1898 and 1906; 4 sons and 3 daughters. The oldest son, Luis Lezama Leguizamón Zuazola, was the provincial Carlist leader in the mid-1930s; he died of typhus when fighting as requeté during the Civil War. Another one, José, was killed as prisoner by the Republicans. Manuel also served as requeté and in the Francoist Spain he emerged as head of the family business conglomerate; Fernando was involved in Carlism until the 1960s. Most of Luis’ grandchildren landed corporate managerial positions, but did not grow to nationwide prominence; the exceptions are Pedro Muruá Lezama-Leguizamón (field-hockey bronze Olympics medalist in 1960) and Ramón Vargas Lezama-Leguizamón (a painter). Among other Luis’ relatives, his older brother Manuel was deputy mayor of Bilbao in the 1890s, provincial deputy in 1907-1911 and a Carlist senator in 1921–1923.

== Entrepreneur ==
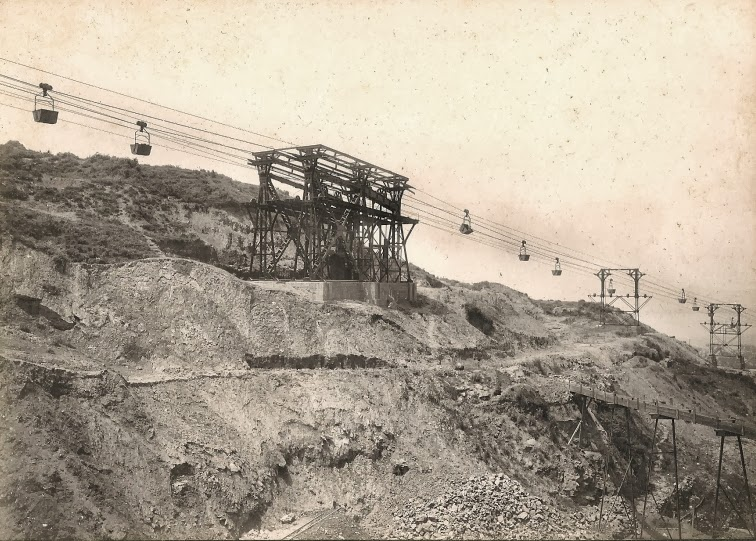
Opencase iron ore mine, Biscay

With his brother Manuel, Luis was co-owner of Hijos de Lezama Leguizamón-Negocios de Minería, the company which owned the inherited business; it consisted of opencast iron ore mines in Etxebarri and Ollargan. Until the late 1890s the Lezamas were granted 5 more mining licenses and ranked as 6th most successful concessionaires in Biscay. At the turn of the centuries they attempted to restructure their mining portfolio; in 1895 the brothers sold Sociedad Coto Minero de Ollargan and in the early 1900s they received first anthracite mining concessions in Asturias. Apart from new licenses in Biscay, in the 1910s the Lezamas obtained further concessions in Asturias; along coal they covered also exploitation of fluorites, plaster and anhydrite deposits.

At one time or another the Lezamas operated some 15 mines in Biscay and Asturias; the jewel in the crown was "Abandonada", an iron ore opencast pit in Miribilla. Some mines were equipped with transportation systems or washeries which provided services to competitive companies; part of their infrastructure was so advanced that it gained scientific articles. It is estimated that the Lezama conglomerate accounted for some 5-6% of the Biscay iron ore production, and even during the First World War it produced some 110-122 thousand tons. In the 1920s, when the Biscay mining was undergoing transformation and family-held companies were being replaced with bank ownership, the Lezamas held firm. For decades engaged in lawsuits against municipal authorities and subject to legal investigation as far as in Britain, during the Primo dictatorship they enjoyed favorable treatment.

Lezama engaged in numerous other initiatives, mostly related to his mining business. In the 1890s he was among stakeholders of La Robla, a new railway line which linked Bilbao with León and Palencia; both regions provided coal, needed for the Biscay iron industry. In the 1910s he was involved in engineering projects related to regulation of the Nervion, vital for iron ore transportation and exploitation. In the early 20th century the Lezamas engaged financially in Banco de Bilbao; for decades Luis held a seat in its executive and in the late 1920s he was its rotating president; he stepped down from Consejo de Administración in the early 1930s. The Lezamas invested also in construction works in Canada, film-making industry in America and in photo business in Catalonia.

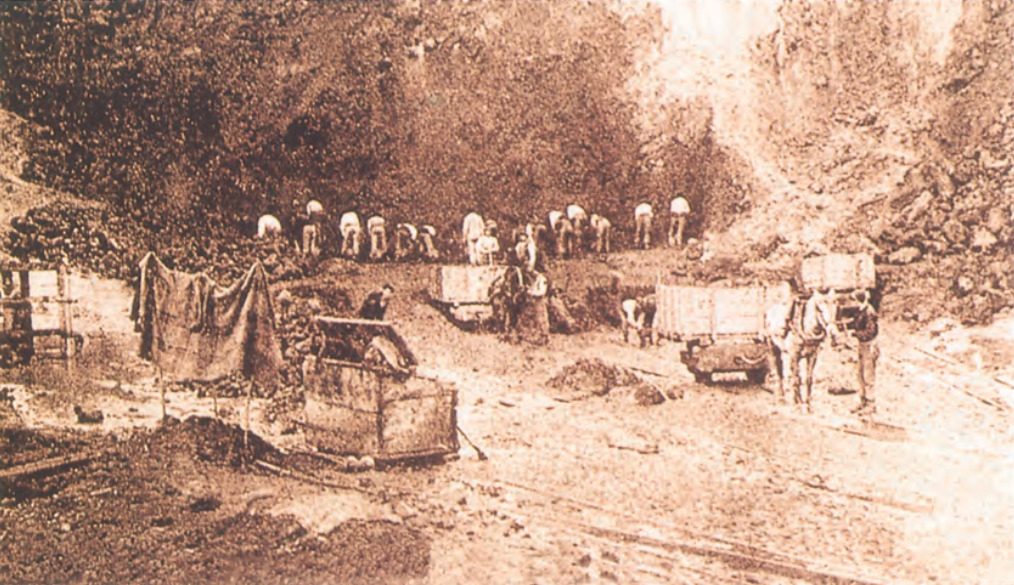
Ollargan mine, 1890s

The Lezama Leguizamóns are not counted among the very top elite of Biscay industrial tycoons, formed by the Ybarra, Martínez Rivas, Chávarri, Sota and Echevarrieta families; however, they are listed as members of the emergent Basque oligarchy; their name repeatedly comes up in history of Biscay industrialization and their companies are listed among the most important ones in Bilbao in the first decades of the 20th century. Their wealth and position was demonstrated by two buildings: Casa Lezama-Leguizamón in the downtown Bilbao, home to numerous corporate and other institutions, and Palacio Lezama-Leguizamón, the family residential estate in Getxo. Both are considered iconic examples of Biscay architecture, made possible by fortunes of the new industrial and financial oligarchy.

== Vascologist ==
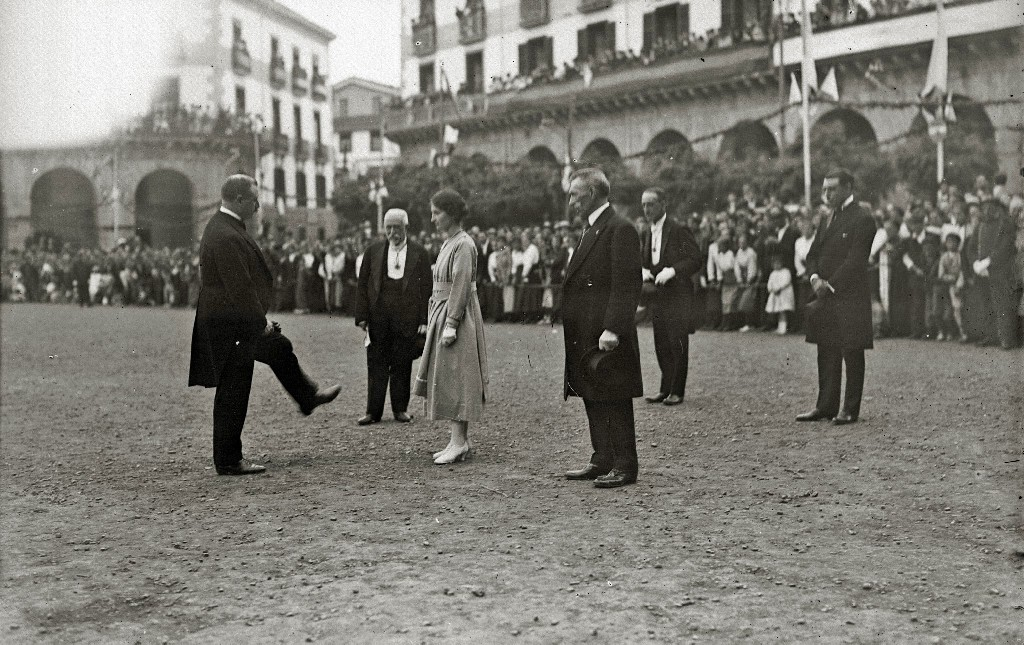
SEV being founded, 1918

Lezama cherished his ethnic heritage and strove to promote the Basque culture. As a wealthy businessman he was best positioned to contribute organization wise. In 1916 he engaged in Euskal Esnalea, an association set up to study Basque language; he took part in its labors and co-organized a grand "Homenaje al idioma vasco", hailed among "conocidos cultivadores del euskera". In the late 1910s he contributed to emergence of Sociedad de Estudios Vascos and took part in its "Subcomisión de autonomía de Vizcaya", entrusted with drafting an autonomy scheme. In 1920-1922 he represented the province of Biscay in Junta Permanente of SEV; from 1923 until death he again was member of the SEV executive; he represented the Traditionalist outlook. Periodically Lezama headed Sección de Historia and Sección de Literatura of the Society; in the early 1920s he was delegated to Junta de Cultura de la Diputación de Vizcaya. In 1927-1928 he entered the SEV committee which was to prepare the most ambitious undertaking so far, an exposition on the 19th-century civil wars in Vascongadas. As the project was flavored with Carlist undertones, eventually the interior ministry effectively prohibited the exposition.

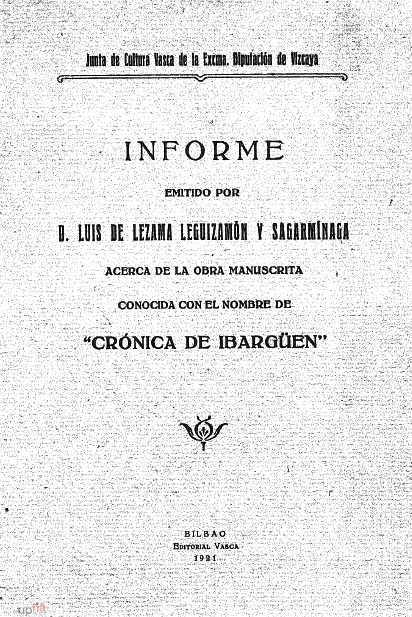
Informe acerca de ... "Crónica de Ibargüen"... (1921)

Lezama's scientific contribution to vascólogia is minor. His key work is Informe acerca de la obra manuscrita conocida con el nombre de "Crónica de Ibargüen" (1921), a 47-page commentary on a 16th-century chronicle, just purchased by the Biscay diputación; it covered bibliographic, geographical, heraldic, archeological and linguistic issues. Other attempts are largely bibliographical and partially biographical pieces published in Revista Internacional de los Estudios Vascos in the 1920s; one of them, El Vascófilo Franciscano R. P. Fr. Juan Mateo de Zabala, was dedicated to an early vascólogist and brother of his maternal grandmother. Despite rather modest output, at least compared to scientific writings of other SEV leaders like Julio Urquijo, Luis Eleizalde or Resurección Azkue, in friendly press Lezama was hailed as "vascofilo ilustrísimo".

Potentially most significant, but ultimately futile and tragic Lezama's efforts to protect the Basque heritage were related to his bibliophile passion. He inherited a collection of manuscripts and old prints from his maternal relative, Zabala; another portion of historical texts was taken over from the family of his wife, the Zuazolas. Lezama multiplied the treasure; for decades he kept searching private, parochial and conventual archives and spent personal fortune on purchases. In the early 1920s his library was considered "mas copiosa y mas importante de las bibliotecas vascongadas", and himself he was dubbed "doctísimo bibliofilo". The collection, estimated to be one of the largest in Spain, occupied entire wing of Lezama's palace in Getxo; apart from Basque-related treasures it included also non-Basque documents related to Spanish history. In total, the collection amounted to 45,000 volumes; the owner admitted access to scholars and shared some documents with various institutions. Almost entire library was lost during the fire of December 1937, caused by malfunction of the heating system.

== Man of culture ==
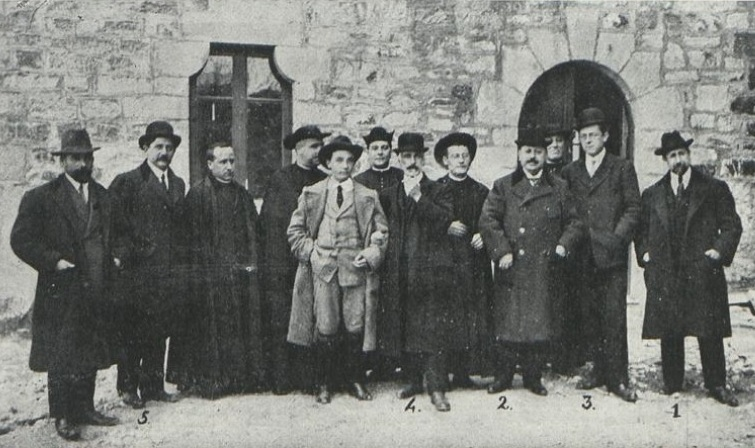
Lezama (1fR) during construction of San Esteban church in Etxebarri

Apart from his vascólogist endeavors, Lezama was engaged in numerous other cultural initiatives, most strongly flavored with zealous Catholicism. The most lasting one was La Gaceta del Norte, the Bilbao daily launched in 1901. It was part of the Catholic counter-offensive against the rising secularization tide and adhered to the "unity of all Catholics" platform, at the time advocated by the hierarchy; it mounted "oposición a ultranza" versus the liberal policy of Canalejas government, especially against the Ley de Asociaciones. Lezama co-founded the daily and provided own financial contribution; similarly, in 1904 he engaged in somewhat broader media initiative, setup of a Bilbao publishing house, Editorial Vizcaina; he served as its vice-president. At least until the late 1910s the Lezama brothers were key owners of La Gaceta; Luis remained in executive of the company and died as Presidente del Consejo de Administración of the daily.

In the early 20th century Lezama was active in numerous other religion-related initiatives. In 1905-1906 he served as treasurer in Junta Directiva which organized diocesan pilgrimages to Rome and Palestine. In the late 1900s he was active in Junta de Defensa Católica de Vizcaya, a non-party association bent on confronting secular initiatives in the province. He set up and financially contributed to a foundation which supported schools in Etxebarri; the Lezamas donated money for construction of new churches in the same district. For years Luis acted as secretary of Junta del Santo Hospital Civil de Bilbao. His charity donations went also beyond the religious format: in the early 1920s he offered assistance to wounded soldiers, recovering from the Moroccan campaign, and made donations to offer accommodation to the deposed Austrian empress and Hungarian queen Zita, who was seeking exile in Bilbao.

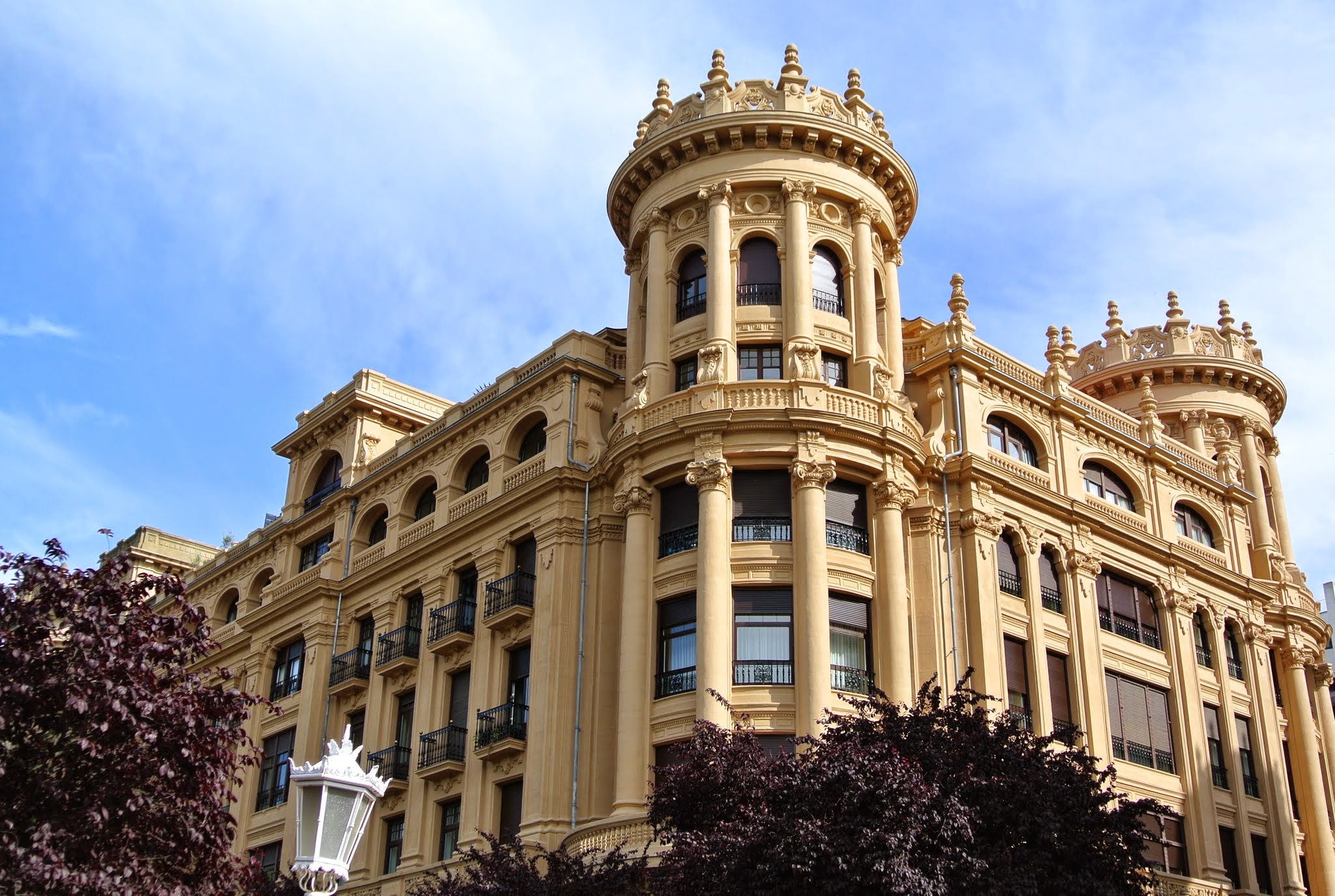
Casa Lezama-Leguizamón, Bilbao

Lezama was a devoted music lover, active in Sociedad Filarmónica de Bilbao; in 1904 he rose to vice-president of the organisation. As he contributed financially, in 1909 the Sociedad organized him a homage concerto; its program included the first public performance of Así cantan los chicos, the first major work of Jesús Guridi. In 1926-1933 he served as president of Sociedad. His bibliophile collection included treasuries of musical history; in case of some, he donated them, e.g. in 1927 he presented a manuscript of Boccherini, consisting of separate vocal and instrumental parts of Stabat Mater, to his native Comune di Lucca. Until his late years Lezama used to take part in musical events, e.g. in 1928 he participated in Congreso Nacional de la Música Sagrada and upon death was acknowledged as "músico eminente". During a few strings in Casa Lezama-Leguizamón at the Bilbao Gran Vía he hosted cultural institutions related and unrelated to music, like Teatro de la Cámara Amarilla and Teatro del Submarino.

== Traditionalist ==
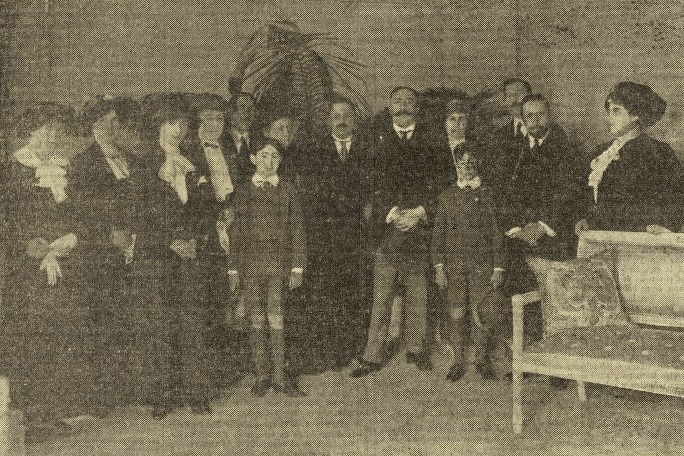
Don Jaime and the families of Manuel and Luis Lezama Leguizamón, 1913

As Lezama's paternal grandfather was a militant Liberal who vehemently opposed the Carlists, and Lezama's father did not engage in politics, it is unclear how Luis and Manuel got involved in the movement. Hagiographic obituaries claimed Luis had been "attracted to Traditionalism in his youth", but there is no confirmation of access until 1892, when the brothers visited Carlos VII in Venice. There is sporadic evidence of Lezama's Carlist engagements during the following few decades. In 1903 Luis hosted the Carlist theorist Vázquez de Mella in Bilbao; later he mixed with Carlists in Catholic organizations. In 1907 he accompanied Don Jaime in Spain; in 1909 together with de Mella they attended the funeral Carlos VII. In the 1910s Lezama was moderately engaged in party propaganda; in 1911 he took part in a banquette to honor Traditionalist deputies, in 1913 both brothers travelled to Paris to pay homage to Don Jaime, and in few cases he appeared on closed-doors Jaimista feasts, e.g. in 1917 in Azcoitia with infanta Beatriz. At the time Luis remained in the shadow of his brother, who headed the Jaimist organisation in Biscay.

During the maturing disagreement between de Mella and Don Jaime both Lezama brothers sided with the former and supported the promellista concept of broader alliances. When the conflict erupted in the climax of 1919, the Lezamas joined the rebel Mellistas; though they counted among their most eminent personalities, in Biscay the dissenters were led by José Joaquín Ampuero and Ignacio Gardeazábal. In the early 1920s Luis and Manuel supported the Mellistas in their struggle to set up a separate organisation; in 1922 Luis covered huge part of massive debt, accumulated by the Mellista daily El Pensamiento Español. The party failed to materialize before the Primo coup. In 1924 both brothers co-signed a manifesto, which pledged support to the dictator; though they declared that no Traditionalist could accept the 1876 constitution as basis for further action, they nevertheless recommended entering Union Patriótica. However, there is little evidence of Luis’ active engagement in primoderiverista structures; the exception is his membership in the 1928 homage committee to Marqués de Estella.

Carlist standard

Following the fall of the monarchy Lezama, at the time together with Ampuero already the patriarch of Biscay Traditionalism, was strongly leaning towards some rapprochement with the Jaimistas, especially prior to the 1931 elections. Lezama's return to orthodox Carlism was sealed by his presence at the funeral of Don Jaime in Paris and his leading of local funeral ceremonies in Biscay; the hardly active Bilbao Mellista structures joined Comunión Tradicionalista in corpore. In the united organisation in 1932 Lezama was nominated the party provincial Biscay leader and later represented the provincial party organization in the nationwide executive. The same year he entered the Carlist junta which inspected the draft of vasco-navarrese autonomous statute; the body eventually refrained from issuing firm recommendations. Few months before death Lezama, who has barely been noted on massive rallies, co-presided over a grand Carlist political gathering in Bilbao.

== See also ==
- Traditionalism
- Carlism
- Mellismo
- Manuel Lezama Leguizamón Sagarminaga
- Palacio Lezama Leguizamón
- Casa Lezama-Leguizamon
