= Miguel Irigaray Gorría =

Spanish politician

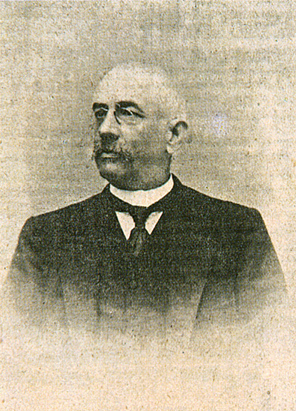
- Born: 1850; Peralta, Spain
- Died: 1903 (aged 52–53); Málaga, Spain
- Occupations: Politician; Lawyer

Miguel Irigaray Gorría (1850–1903) was a Spanish Carlist politician from Navarre. His career climaxed during three terms in Congreso de los Diputados, the lower chamber of the Cortes; in 1896–1898 (from Tudela), 1901–1903 (from Aoiz) and 1903 (again from Aoiz); his bids of 1886, 1891, 1893 and 1898 were unsuccessful. During his service he was recognized principally as an ardent opponent of governmental secularization policy, who in numerous parliamentarian addresses spoke in favor of the Church – especially religious orders – and who demanded that the constitutionally guaranteed religious liberty be abolished.

== Family and youth ==
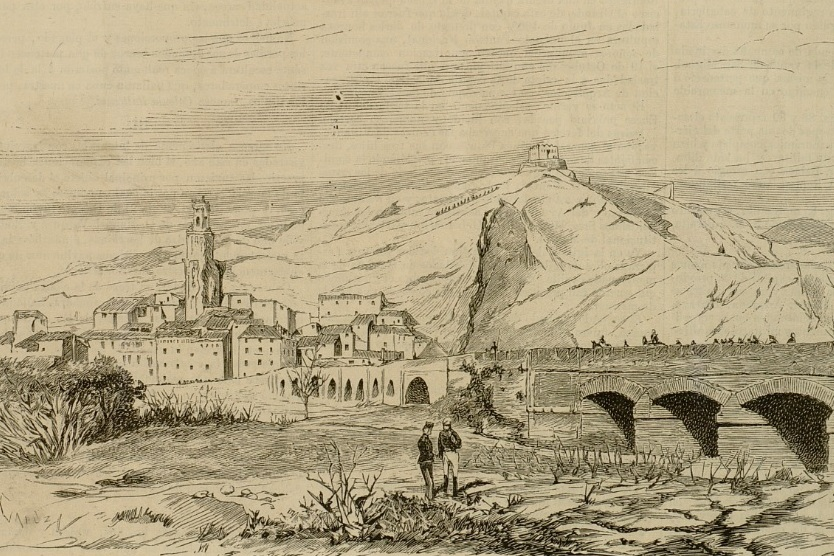
Peralta, around 1850

The family of Irigaray is of Basque origin; in the early modern era one branch settled in southern Navarre, in the area along the Ebro known as Ribera Alta. The first Irigaray was baptized in the town of Peralta in 1620; six generations followed until the great-grandfather of Miguel, Juan Irigaray Cerdán (born 1740) and then his grandfather Sebastián Irigaray Alemán (born 1770) were recorded in the local parish documents; their status and social position is not clear. The father of Miguel, Anselmo Irigaray Iturbide (1804–1885), was also born in Peralta. In the press or in historiography he was referred to as “propietario” or “ganadero". As the owner of some 9,5 hectares near the village of Azagra he counted in-between modest landholders and well-off farmers in the county. He specialized in breeding of sheep; in the late 1850s his flock was about 900 animals. Between the mid-1850s and the mid-1860s he served in the local ayuntamiento, and in 1866–1867 he was the alcalde of Peralta.

Anselmo married a local girl 24 years his junior, Eusebia Gorría Irigaray, descendant to a Gorría family which has been long inter-marrying with the Irigarays. The couple lived on the family estate in Peralta and had 8 children, 6 boys and 2 girls, born between 1849 and 1866. Miguel was their second oldest child and the second oldest son. In 1862 and at the age of 12 he entered Seminario Conciliar de Pamplona as a start of his religious career. He was an excellent student who gathered meritissimus marks as sort of routine; however, at unspecified time though probably in the late 1860s he resigned the ecclesiastic path, reportedly because of his poor health. At the outbreak of the Third Carlist War he joined the legitimist ranks and served in Carlist administrative structures in Navarre; he is referred to as secretario of “Junta ó Diputación carlista”, “Junta de Guerra” or “Junta Gubernativa de Navarra”.

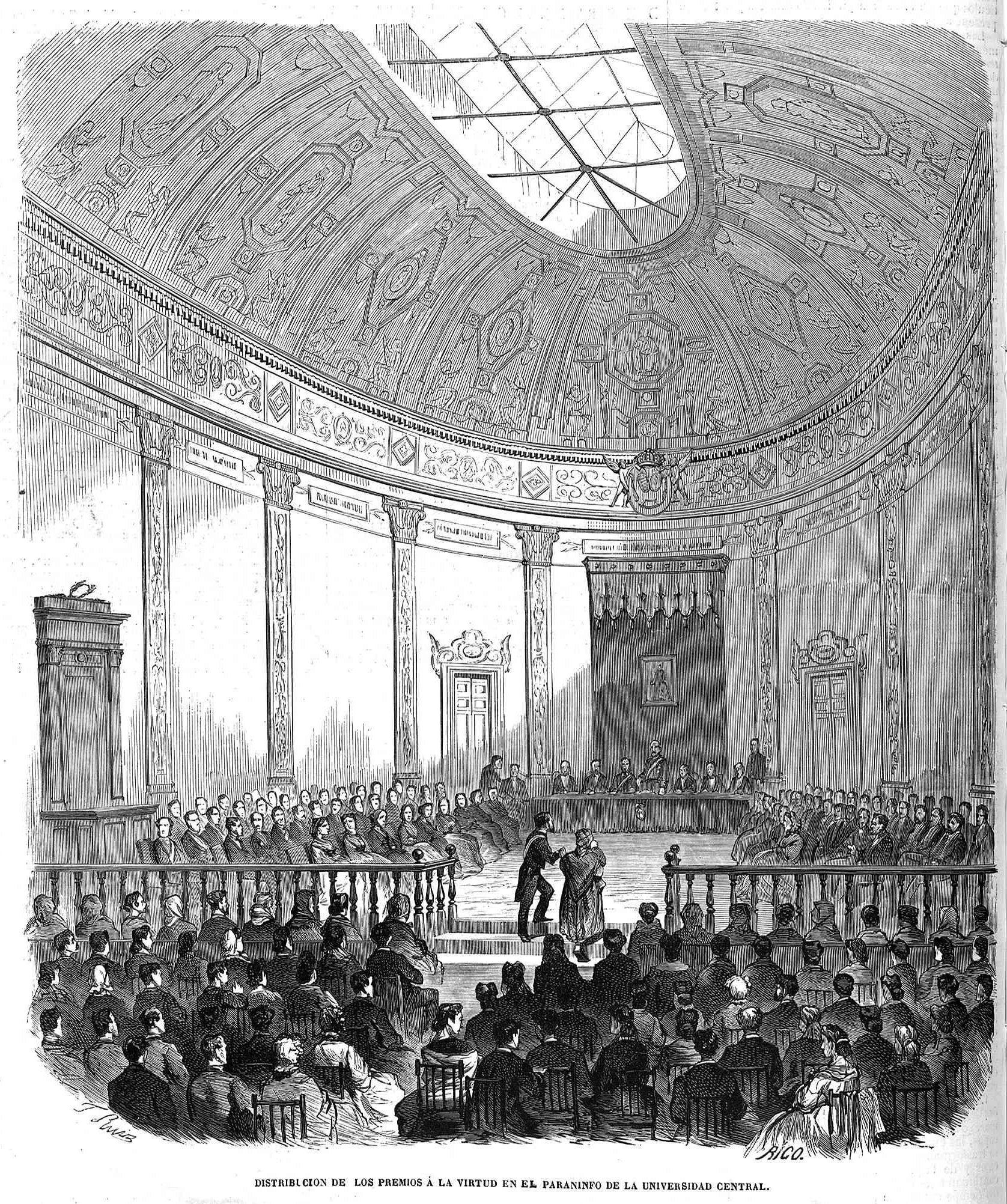
Universidad Central, 19th. c.

After the Carlist defeat Irigaray opted for a career in law. Following the period of self-learning in 1877 he obtained the baccalaureate with an unspecified, probably Navarrese institution; he then moved to Madrid, passed most exams at Universidad Central and graduated in civil and canonical law in 1878, issued the appropriate ministerial certificate in 1879. In 1883 or 1884 Irigaray married María Marco Buelta, descendant to a well-known Marco family from Valle de Roncal. Her father, Francisco León Marco Mayo, was a recognized notary in the mountainous town of Uztarróz. Close to nothing is known about the marriage, except that it lasted at least until 1892. The couple settled in Peralta, but either in the late 1880s or in the early 1890s they moved to Madrid. It is neither known whether the couple had any children; contrary to the custom of the era Irigaray's obituary notes did not refer either to his wife or to any descendants. Irigaray's brother Eusebio in the early 20th century served as the mayor of Peralta.

== Early public career (until 1890) ==
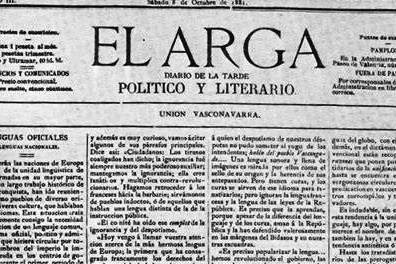
El Arga

Already in 1865 Irigaray was signing various Traditionalism-flavored open letters; as older teenager he was active in Juventud Católica. Exact years of his service in the Carlist administration in the early 1870s are not clear. Once back from his academic spell in Madrid, in the late 1870s and the early 1880s Irigaray engaged in Basque cultural initiatives, and this is despite near-extinction of Basque language in the Navarrese Ribera. He entered Asociación Euskara and tried to animate El Arga, a four-weekly of fuerista-vasquista profile. In the mid-1880s he gained some local recognition; prior to the 1886 elections he was reported as a Carlist candidate in his native Tafalla district, but it is not clear whether he withdrew or lost. In 1887 he took part in a conference, organized in the Madrid Universidad Central and dedicated to agricultural crisis. During the event he appeared as “representante del ayuntamiento de Tafalla”, but it is not clear whether he was contracted by the Tafalla town hall or whether some time in the mid-1880s he was elected to the ayuntamiento. Irigaray lobbied on part of Navarrese wine growers and demanded that the government introduce measures to limit production of “alcohol industrial”, nearing imposing a state monopoly.

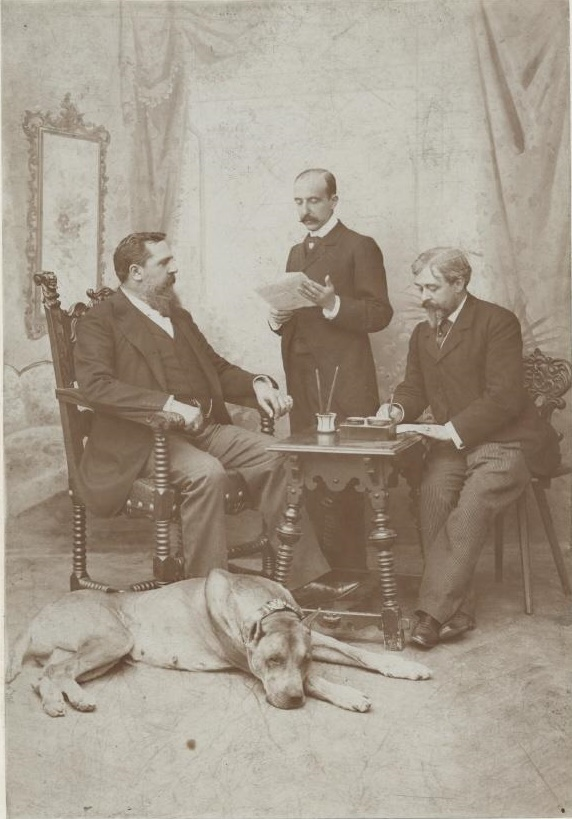
claimant Carlos VII and Cerralbo

The year of 1888 produced breakup in Carlist structures; supporters of Ramón Nocedal left to form their own organization and they soon became known as the Integrists. Irigaray was not listed as a protagonist of the strife. However, the Carlist Navarrese daily El Tradicionalista sided with the breakaways; the loyalists decided to launch their own periodical, named La Lealtad Navarra. Irigaray was among these who contributed to its emergence; he was later also one of the contributors to La Lealtad, directed by Alfonso Fernández Casado. However, in the late 1880s his stay in Navarre was about to end; either in 1889 or in 1890 he moved his law firm to Madrid. The motive quoted by historians was “razones profesionales”. It is known that in 1890 Irigaray was the legal representative of Diputación de Navarra in Madrid, but it is not clear whether it was this particular assignment which triggered his translation to the capital; he later represented also the cities of Tudela and Tafalla.

In 1890 Irigaray became secretary general of the Carlist Junta Directiva of Madrid, presided by the nationwide party leader, Marqués de Cerralbo. He emerged as one of active members of the Madrid círculo, particularly competent in economic issues; in the early 1890s he was noted delivering lectures on commercial and business questions to his fellow party members. Though there were 3 vice-presidents, Irigaray co-presided some Traditionalist sessions in Madrid and was privileged to take to the floor after Cerralbo. Apart from representing the Navarrese deputation he was also active as a lawyer in numerous civil and criminal cases, e.g. defending in court the religious, charged by the authorities. Some sources mention also his “trabajos periodísticos”, but apart from the Pamplonese La Avalancha it is not clear what were the periodicals he contributed to.

== Two Cortes bids and the Corbató case (1891–1895) ==
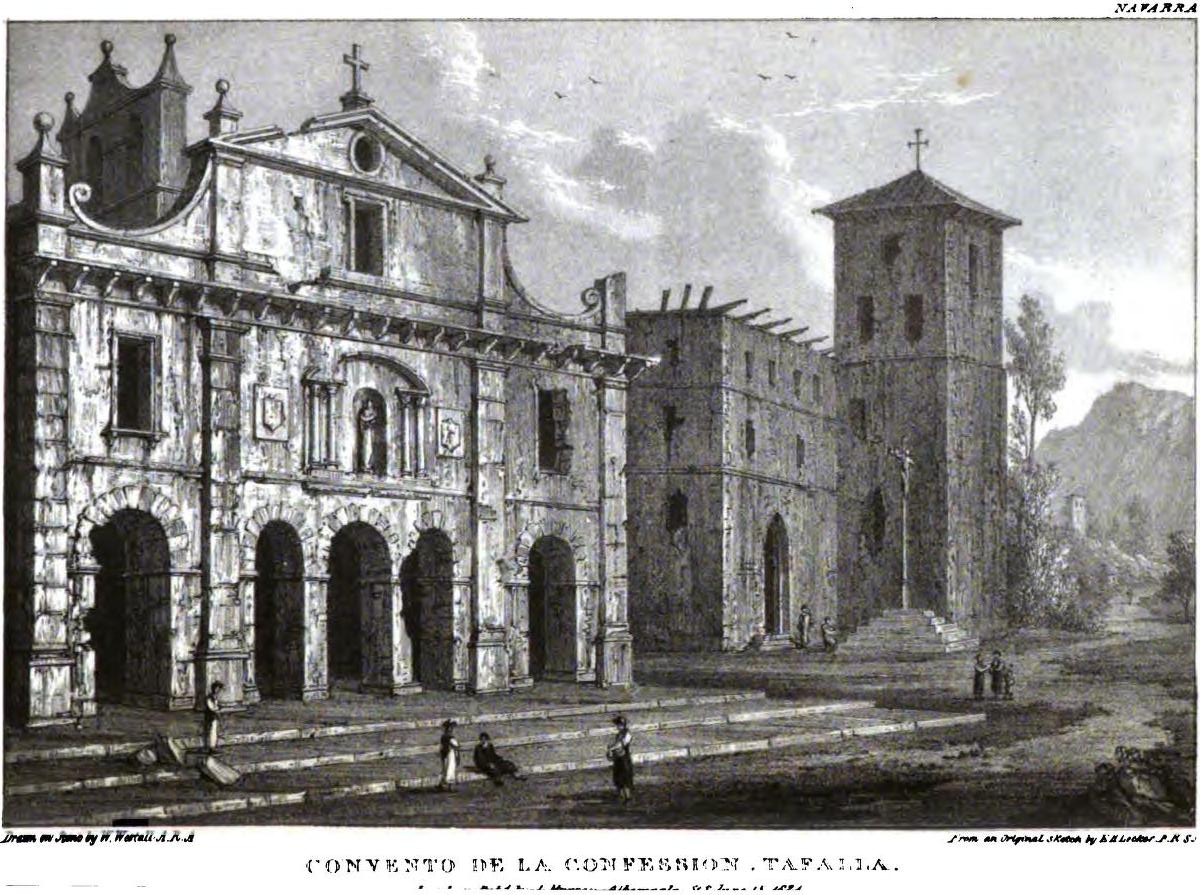
Tafalla, 19th. c.

During the 1891 general elections Irigaray again stood as a Carlist candidate in the district of Tafalla; his counter-candidate was a conservative rival Cecilio Gurrea Zaratiegui. With 3,008 votes gathered he gained support of 38% of the voters, insufficient to obtain the mandate. He lost in 22 out of 32 local constituencies, though he emerged victorious in Peralta. However, his law firm was doing well; in 1892 he moved to new premises and was applauded as a distinguished abogado also in the progressist press, some of his addresses in court considered “among the best in recent times”. He kept delivering key notes in the Carlist Madrid círculo, at times jointly with Cerralbo, and at times spoke at open party rallies. In some Carlist initiatives he stood as representative of Navarre; occasionally he kept writing editorials to the semi-official Carlist press mouthpiece, El Correo Español. However, his poor health kept posing a problem and every some time, e.g. in 1892, the party press informed about the sequence of his illness and recovery.

In the 1893 general elections Irigaray – in the press referred to either as “abogado” or “haciendista” – decided to renew his bid from Tafalla. He again faced the same conservative rival, Gurrea Zaratiegui, and lost again, though this time by a small margin. Irigaray filed a complaint and charged his counter-candidate with electoral corruption. The claim was endorsed in the Cortes by the fellow Carlist Matías Barrio y Mier, who agonized about buying votes in Caparroso; however, the triumph of Gurrea was eventually confirmed. Irigaray withdrew to Madrid, where he kept delivering lectures on economy; the bottom line was that Liberal rules were bringing nothing but decline. As member of the regional Madrid party leadership he had the opportunity to take part in gatherings of the nationwide Carlist command layer; on exceptional basis he was seen beyond the capital and Navarre, e.g. in Manresa. He also went on as abogado, again noted for defending the religious.

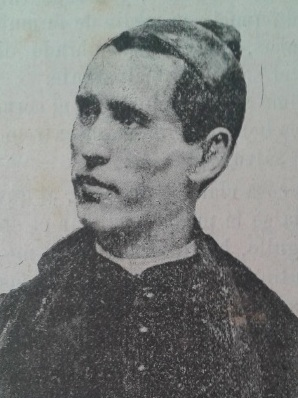
Corbato

In 1894 Spain was rocked by a scandal caused by a Carlist priest from Valencia, José Corbató; in his brochure he claimed that the regent Maria Christina was leading the Spanish freemasonry. Corbató was brought to court for offending the royal. When organizing legal assistance Carlist structures were choosing between Vázquez de Mella and Irigaray as Corbató's lawyers, but they eventually settled for the latter. Irigaray asked for acquittal, but proceedings were gradually turning against him. He then resolved to a number of tricks, e.g. he asked an auxiliary attorney, also a Carlist, to fake illness in order to save time, or started calling numerous witnesses trying to demonstrate that their accounts were mutually conflicting. Following an unusually long trial, in December 1895 Corbató was sentenced to 11 years and 4 months in prison.

== In the Cortes and beyond (1896–1900) ==
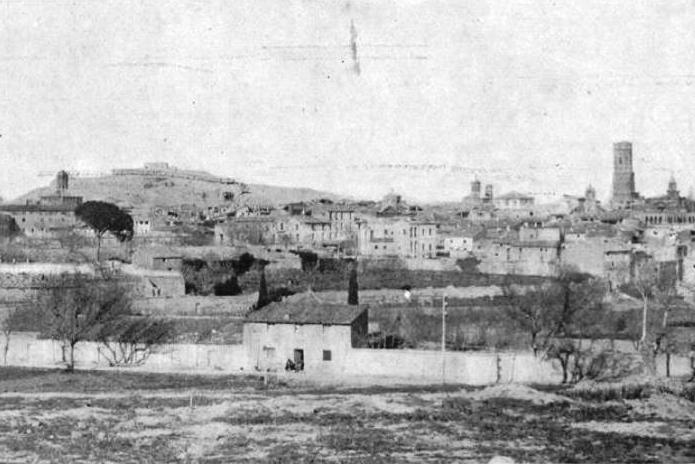
Tudela, around 1900

During the 1896 elections Irigaray opted for the neighboring district of Tudela, challenging the incumbent liberal candidate, Martin Guelbenzu Sánchez. It turned out that he benefited from the moderate vote getting split between Guelbenzu and the governmental candidate; though Irigaray gathered merely 37% of all votes cast he emerged victorious. However, in the chamber he was a rather inactive deputy, perhaps the result of his renewed health problems. He limited his endeavors to co-signing letters or manifestos issued in name of the 10-member Carlist minority. Irigaray appeared more eloquent when talking to the Traditionalist press. At the time national media started to fear another Carlist rising, anticipated in wake of the growing problems in Cuba and the Philippines. In his 1896–1897 statements Irigaray remained entirely in line with the strategy adopted by Cerralbo; he declared that colonial trouble was the result of Liberal mismanagement, that the Carlists for the time being were not gearing up to violent action, that they would do nothing which might endanger Spanish national interest, and that they had full trust in Carlos VII.

In the new electoral campaign of 1898 Irigaray again opted for Tudela, where he again had to face Guelbenzu. Though his 2,965 votes gathered were more than two years earlier, they were no match for 3,975 of his rival. A contemporary historian speculates that the defeat might have resulted from neutral stand adopted by the Integrists, who refused to support the Carlist candidate. A somewhat untypical pattern was demonstrated by Irigaray's victory in two largest cities of the district, Tudela and Corella; scholars note that the party had little following in rural zones, which runs against the typical pattern of Carlists faring badly in urban constituencies and enjoying larger support in small villages. Following defeat Irigaray was embittered and complained about those who betrayed him; he also declared he would now focus on his law career and on his health. Despite initial plan he did not take part in the successive electoral campaign of 1899 as the claimant ordered abstention.

Carlist standard

Plagued by continuous health problems Irigaray continued his law career; he was noted for applying the Navarrese traditional legislation to civil cases heard in the Madrid court. He represented El Correo Español when the newspaper was sued by the administration, though the result remains unknown. He was among collaborators of Biblioteca Populár Carlista, a series of booklets launched by a Barcelona publishing house; also some of his lectures in the círculo were issued as separate pamphlets. In the late 1890s Irigaray grew to vice-president of the Madrid círculo (presided by Casasola). Though he was not member of Junta Nacional, he took part in decision-making process within the national executive. It is not clear what was Irigaray's position about the conflict between the insurgent and the conciliatory factions within the party, which eventually led to the 1899 resignation of de Cerralbo and his replacement by Matías Barrio y Mier.

== Deputy again (1901–1903) ==
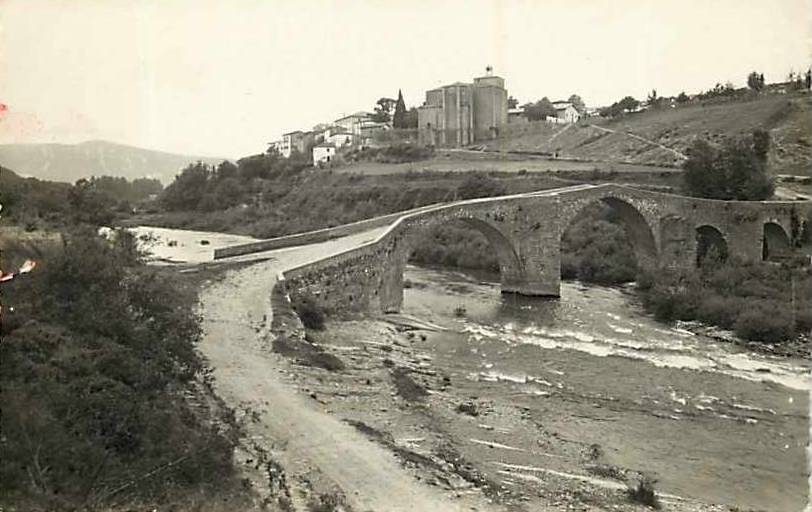
Aoiz, early 20h c.

Ahead of the 1901 elections Irigaray initially declared having been uninterested; when an umbrella organization Unión de Católicos asked him to be its representative in another Navarrese district of Aoiz he declined, quoting poor health. However, he eventually accepted the proposal, especially that also the Integrists agreed to support him. Irigaray's rival was supposed to be the local liberal cacique from Roncal Valentin Gayarre, who had held the mandate during 3 previous terms. However, thanks to backstage agreement between the Carlists and their arch-enemies, Liberals, Gayarre decided to stand in Málaga and in last minute he withdrew from the race in Aoiz; in result, Irigaray was elected unopposed and joined the 6-member Carlist minority.

Unlike during his first term, this time Irigaray made himself heard. At that time the Liberals launched what is described in historiography as the first “campaña anticlerical del siglo XX”, with numerous related issues like status of religious orders, education, cemeteries, marriages etc. The Carlists were the first to mount a counter-offensive; in 1901 Irigaray with 4 other deputies filed a motion to derogate paragraph 11 of the constitution, which guaranteed religious liberty; the purpose declared was to re-introduce Catholic unity. A series of plenary debates ensued with a number of grand harangues delivered in the chamber; Irigaray was among those most active, and he clashed with Blasco Ibañez. Traditionalist press hailed his addresses as mastery of logic and rhetoric; today scholars claim that they contained some canonical errors incompatible with the Catholic doctrine. The Liberal leader Canalejas charged him with advancing clericalism, Matías Barrio counter-charged ridiculing Canalejas. Irigaray at one point declared that one could not be a Catholic and a liberal and claimed that liberalism was a sin. The progressist papers immediately seized the opportunity and started to mock Irigaray.

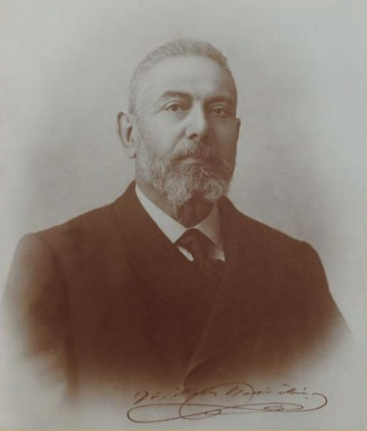
Matías Barrio y Mier

Following the period of hectic activity in 1902 Irigaray had to temporarily withdraw into privacy, again because of his pulmonary problems; he settled in Málaga, as its winter climate was recommended by doctors. Prior to the 1903 elections the Aoiz section of Unión de Católicos preferred his candidature to this of Arturo Campión and again offered him their support. Like 2 years earlier there was no counter-candidate standing and Irigaray got his mandate easily prolonged; this time the Carlist minority in the chamber counted 7 deputies. However, his health was getting worse by day. He was barely seen in the Cortes; he took the oath in mid-June, but in the fall he had to leave for Málaga, where he died in early December. The obituary speech in the Cortes was delivered by Enrique Gil Robles.

== See also ==
- Carlism
- Traditionalism (Spain)
- Navarrese electoral Carlism during the Restoration
- Electoral Carlism (Restoration)
