= Josep de Suelves i de Montagut =

Spanish politician (1850–1926)

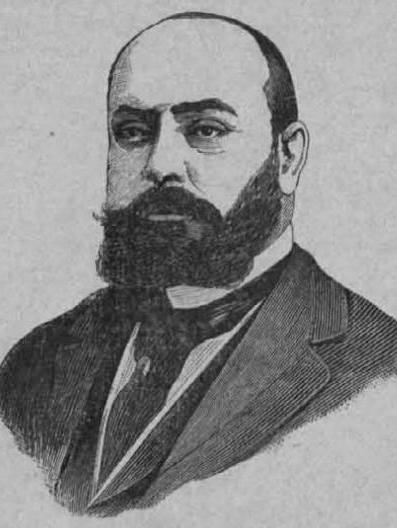
- Born: Josep de Suelves i de Montagut; 1850; Tortosa, Spain
- Died: 1926 (aged 75–76); Madrid, Spain
- Occupation: politician
- Known for: politician
- Political party: Carlism

Josep de Suelves i de Montagut, 9th Marquis of Tamarit (1850–1926) was a Spanish Carlist politician. He served in the lower house of the Cortes during 4 terms in 1896–1899, 1901-1903 and 1907–1910; his term in the upper chamber, the Senate, covered the period of 1899–1900.

== Family and youth ==
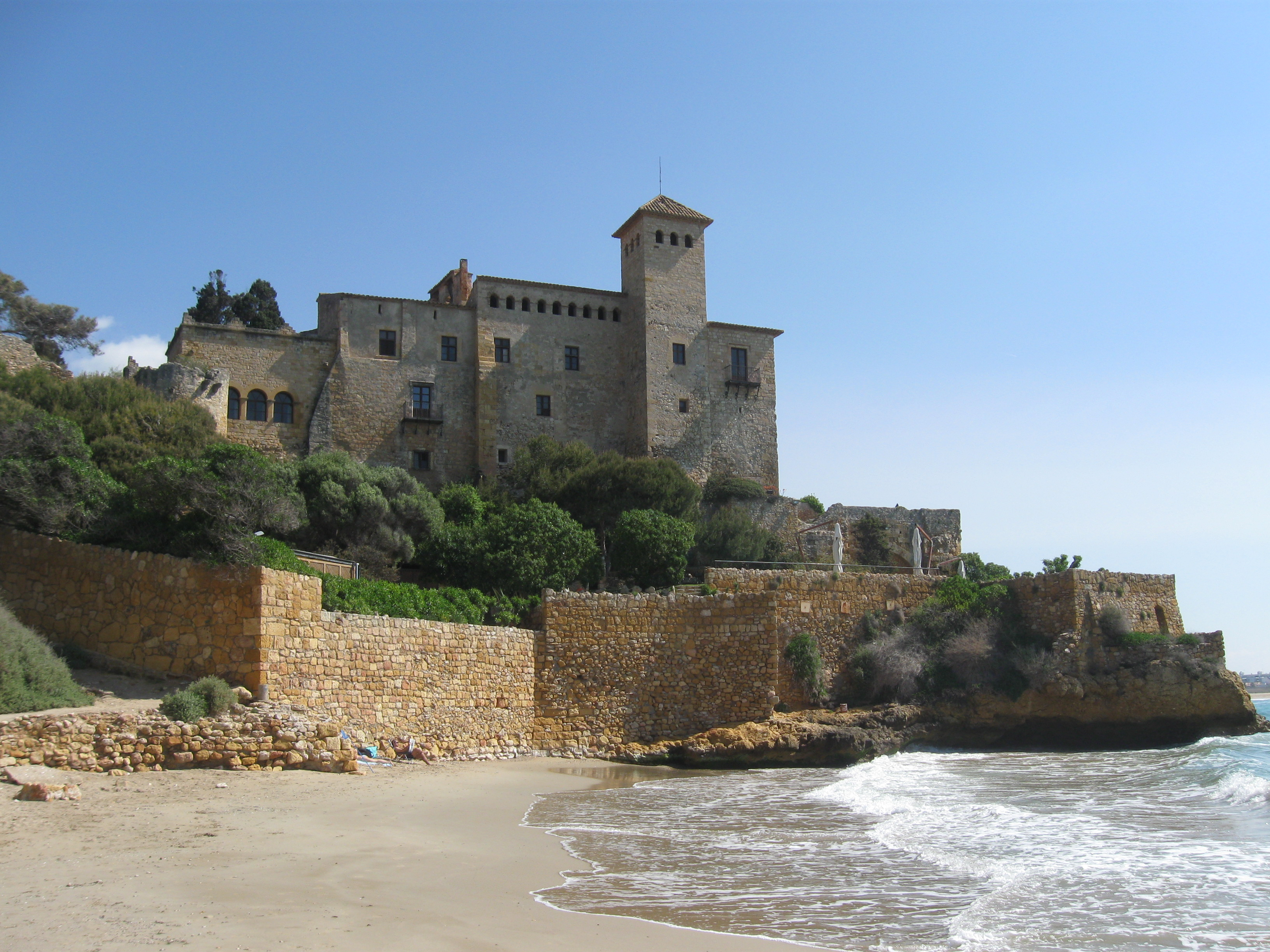
Tamarit castle, Tamarit

Paternal ancestors of Josep de Suelves i de Montagut came from two distinguished aristocratic Catalan families. Representatives of the Montserrat line are recorded in the Middle Ages already; Francesc de Montserrat Vives made his name during the siege of Tarragona in the time of the Reapers' War (Guerra dels Segadors) in the mid-17th century and was awarded the marquesado of Tamarit by Carlos II in 1681. In 1794 the title passed along the maternal line to Josep's great-grandfather, Joan Nepomucé de Suelves i Montserrat, an anti-liberal Tarragona deputy to Cortes of Cádiz. His son, 7th marqués de Tamarit, sided with the legitimist cause during the First Carlist War and was exiled afterwards. His grandson, 8th marqués, Antoni de Suelves i d'Ustariz (Josep's paternal uncle), followed the family tradition forming part of Royal Council of the pretender Carlos VII and since late 1860s participated in preparations to another insurgency. Antoni's younger brother, Joan de Suelves i d'Ustariz, married Buenaventura Montagut Félez, native of Tortosa and daughter of Josep Montagut Salvador, Conde Torre de l'Espanyol. The couple had three children.

Josep, the oldest of the siblings, spent most of his childhood in family estates across Catalonia, to complete secondary education in colleges in Reus and Tortosa. In the late 1860s he studied Derecho y Filosofia in Universidad Central of Madrid. In 1885 he married María Goyeneche Puente (1862-1941), daughter of a Peruvian diplomat and Peruvian/Spanish conservative politician Juan Mariano Goyeneche y Gamio, 3rd Conde de Guaqui, by virtue of his family ties related to Navarre and Gipuzkoa. When in 1886 despite his two marriages the 8th marqués de Tamarit died without issue, Josep inherited the marquesado. He acquired also part of his uncle's wealth, consisting mostly of numerous landholdings around Tarragonese locations of Tamarit, Ferran and Morell, though also in some more distant municipalities.

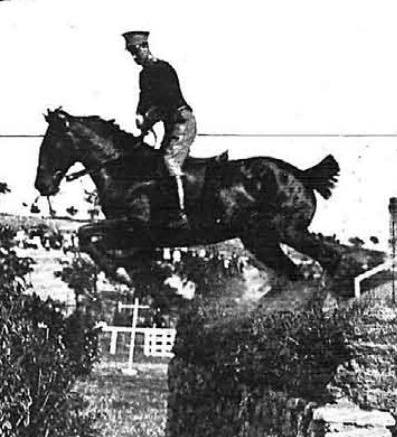
oldest son, 1910

Josep de Suelves i de Montagut and María Goyeneche Puente had 3 children, Juan Nepomuceno Suelves Goyeneche, José Suelves Goyeneche and Carmen Suelves Goyeneche. The oldest, Juan (b. 1887), in 1908 became the 10th marqués de Tamarit as his father renounced the title. He joined the military and served in the cavalry Husares regiment, reaching the rank of a comandante during the Moroccan campaigns of the early 1920s. At the outbreak of the Spanish Civil War in 1936 he joined the insurgents and assumed command of the Carlist Requeté battalion of Tercio de San Ignacio from Gipuzkoa; killed in action in June 1937 in Sopuerta in Biscay. His granddaughter and great-granddaughter of Josep, herself a Peruvian citizen, married the oldest grandson of Franco in 1981.

== War and exile ==
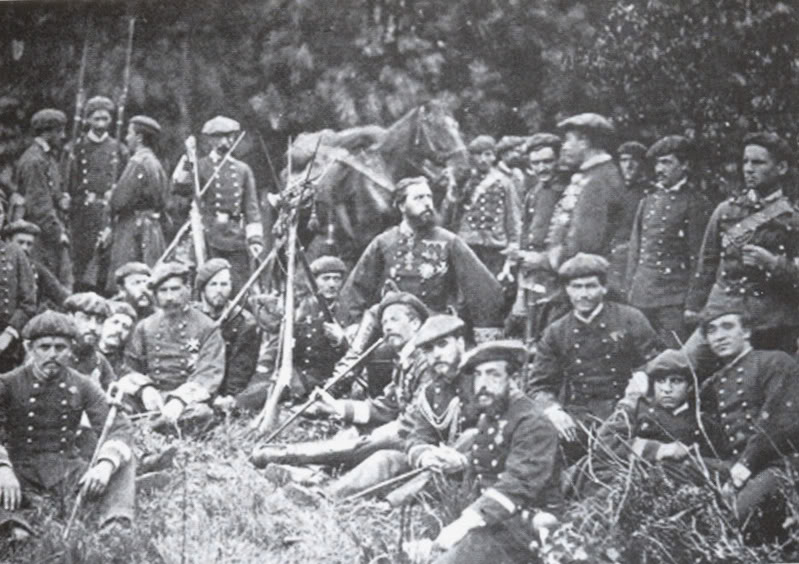
Suelves and his king, ca 1874

Upon the outbreak of the Glorious Revolution and deposition of Isabella II, the Carlists geared up their preparations to military action. Antoni de Suelves as advisor to Carlos VII arranged for his nephew to be called to the legitimist camp. In 1868 Josep de Suelves left Spain to join the personal entourage of the claimant and contributed to the buildup of the insurgency. Four years later, as the Third Carlist War actually commenced, they crossed the border in Gipuzkoa, after few days withdrawing back to France. In 1873 Carlos VII entered the insurgent Vascongadas again. Despite that his uncle was appointed royal commissioner for the native – though barely captured – provinces of Tarragona and Lerída, Josep de Suelves remained on the Northern Front; he accompanied the pretender when setting a capital of the Carlist state in Estella.

The actual role and function of Josep de Suelves is unclear. In later Carlist propaganda he was presented as member of the claimant's General Staff, though his young age and total lack of either military training or military experience suggest he was not in charge of any major duties. If indeed forming part of Estado Mayor, he was rather serving as liaison officer or adjutant to Carlos VII. Though awarded a number of orders and promoted to teniente coronel, it is not clear whether he served one time or another in combat units. Upon the Carlist defeat in 1876 Josep Suelves kept escorting the claimant and left for France. As a reward for service Carlos VII conferred upon him the title of Vizconde de Montserrat, officially recognized by the Spanish state during the Franco era in 1954.

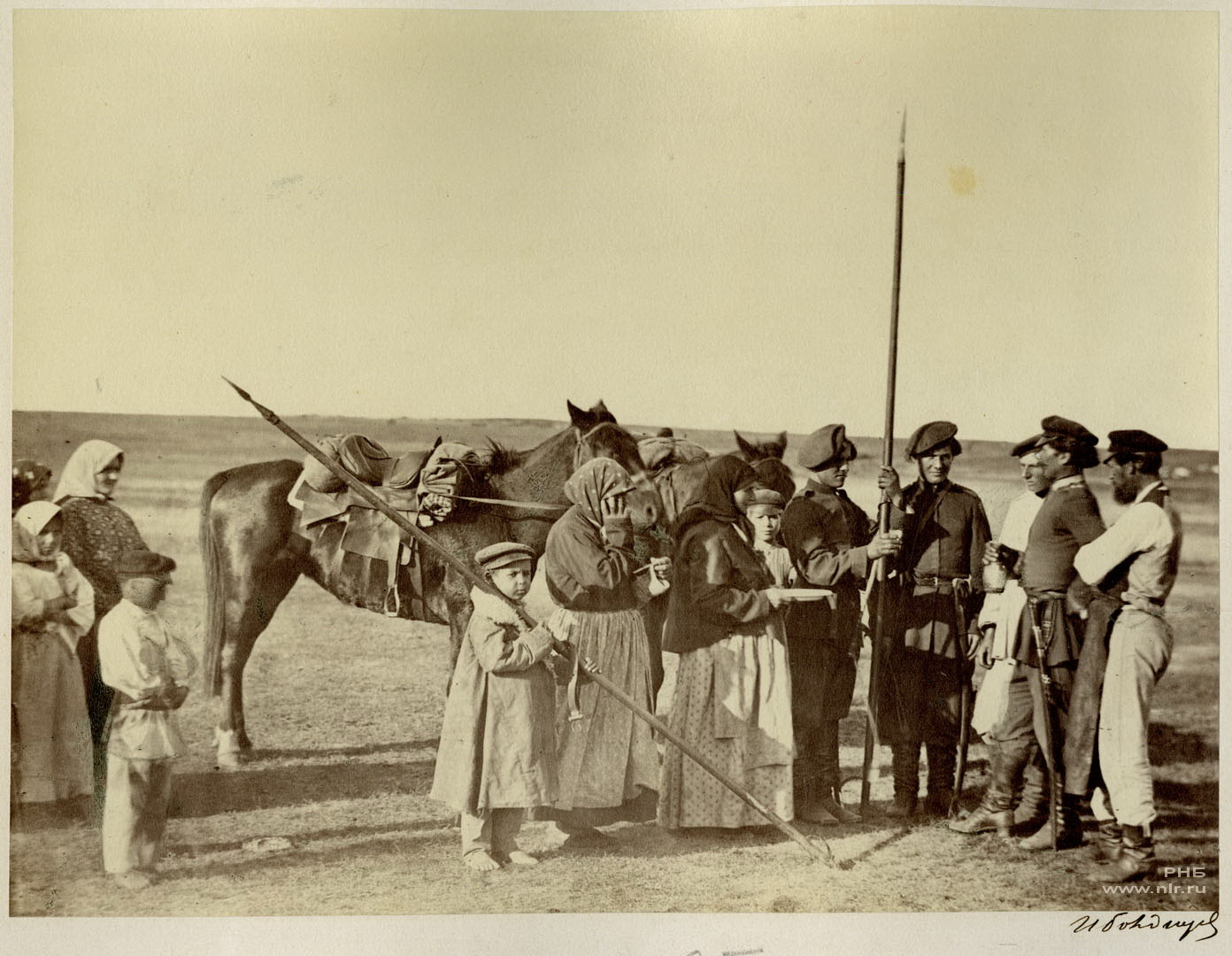
Don Cossacks, 1876

Pressed by the French authorities, the pretender boarded a ship in Boulogne and left for Britain; Suelves travelled with him, accompanying Carlos VII also in course of further voyages across the Atlantic to the United States and Mexico. In 1877 the claimant and his entourage returned to Europe and headed for the Balkans; in the Romanian Ploiești they met the Russian Tsar Alexander II and agreed taking part in the commencing Russo-Turkish War. The four Spaniards were assigned to the Russian IX. Corps, probably first to 34th and later to 9th Cossack regiments; they witnessed the siege of Nicopolis, crossed the Danube, joined the headquarters of prince Carol I of Romania and took part in two battles of Plevnia. It is not clear whether Suelves accompanied the claimant during the rest of his bon vivant period and in successive journeys to Britain, again the United States, India, Africa and South America in the late 1870s and early 1880s, though some sources indicate that his wedding of 1886 took place in Peru.

== Cacique ==
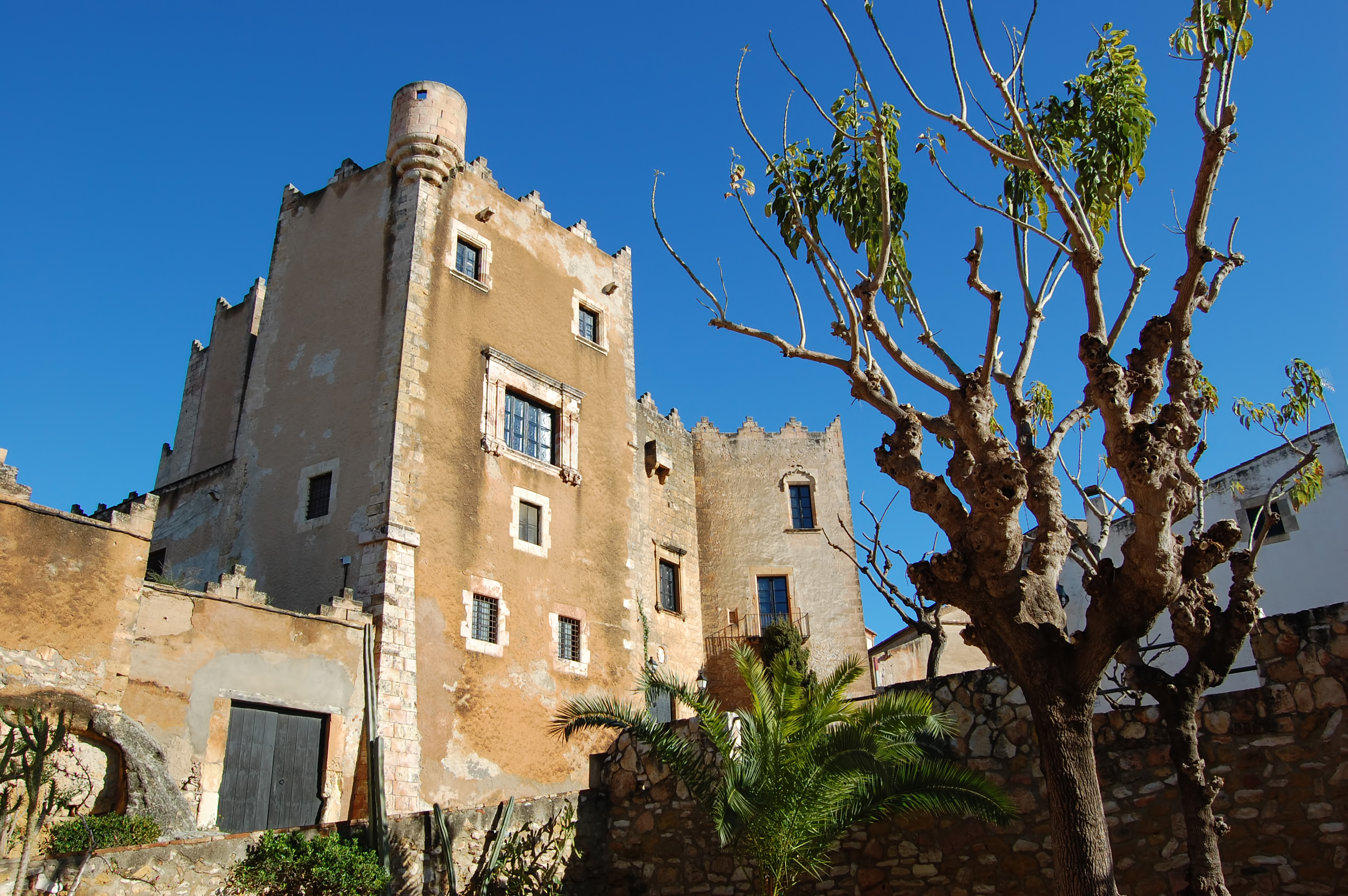
Altafulla residence

As in 1886 Suelves assumed marquesado de Tamarit after his deceased uncle, he started to visit Spain. Living intermittently in Paris and in his Catalan family castle of Altafulla, he permanently settled in the latter residence in the early 1890s. Following the years of abstention the Carlists for the first time during Restauración officially joined the electoral race in 1891; Suelves fielded the candidature in his native district of Roquetes near Tortosa. He stood no chance against the conservative candidate Alberto Bosch y Fustegueras, quoting political corruption and caciquismo as reasons of his defeat. Though in 1893 he was initially reported as standing, eventually he did not run.

Prior to the 1896 campaign Tamarit concluded that challenging candidates of two partidos turnistas in a single-mandate district was a lost cause; instead, he decided to run in the multi-mandate circunscripción of Tarragona. He was successfully voted in and joined the small Carlist minority in the Cortes. During the next 20 years he kept competing in almost all electoral campaigns from the same district, victorious also in 1898, 1901 and 1907. In 1899, when the claimant ordered abstention anticipating another Carlist insurgency, Tamarit did run as independent and lost, but was consoled having been elected to the Senate. In 1903 he lost, possibly suffering from internal conflict within the Tarragona Carlism, and did not compete in 1905. Following the triumph within Solidaritat Catalana in 1907, he failed during re-election campaigns of 1910, 1914 and 1916, losing to Liberal, Republican and Catalanist candidates; his defeat was initially marginal to turn decisive later on. In 1918 he did not compete; Suelves/Montserrat apparently intended to run for Senate, but eventually it was the former deputy from Gerona Dalmacio Iglesías who successfully represented provincial Carlism in the upper house. He acknowledged that it was probably time for political retirement.

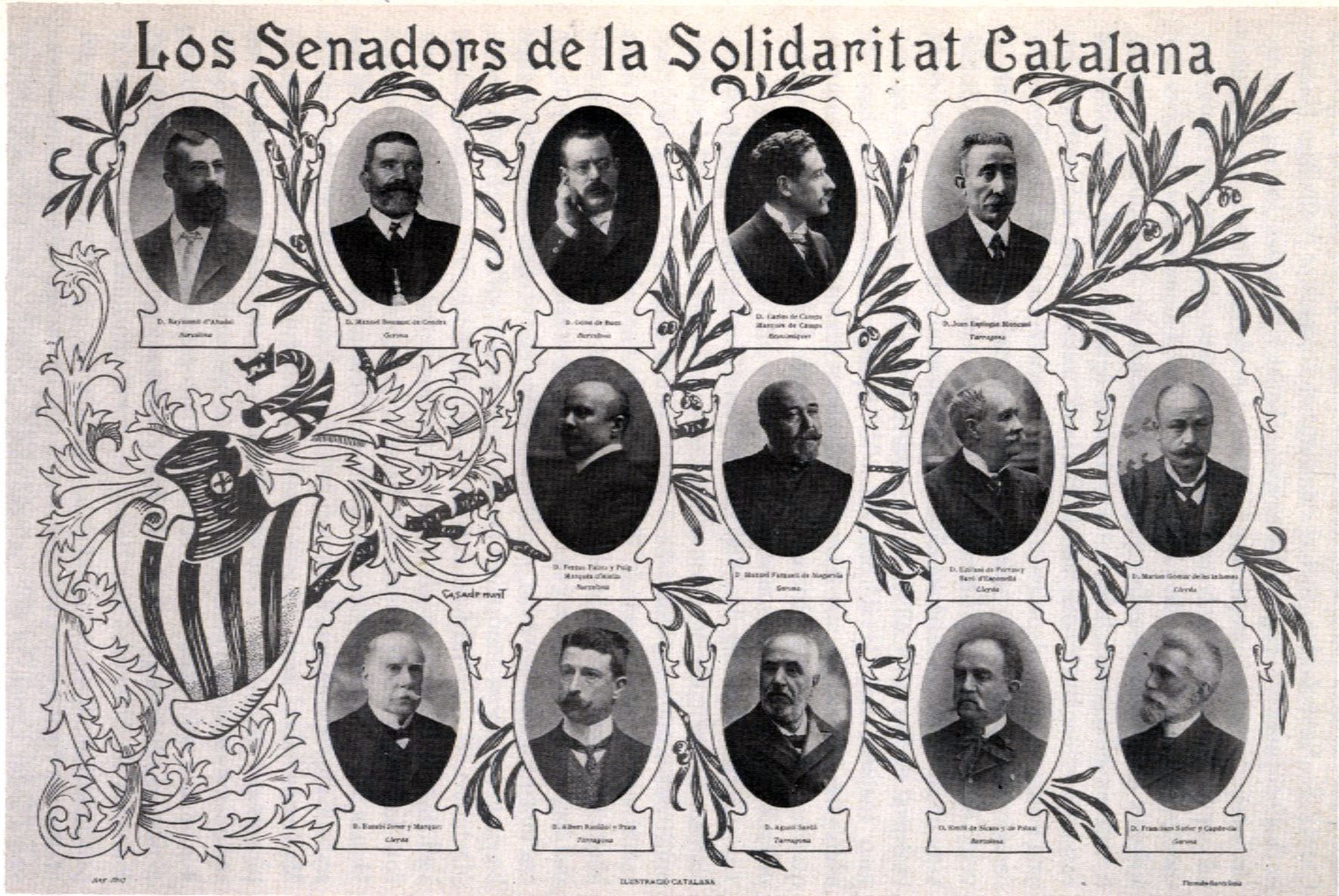
Solidaritat Catalana postcard

A present-day scholar considers Tamarit an exemplary cacique, local party boss fundamental to culture of clientelism and political corruption, typical for Spain of that period; he is also pictured as representative of this branch of Carlism which perfectly accommodated itself to the Restauración political environment. His electoral career was made possible by backstage political negotiations and by flexibility bordering opportunism, as Tamarit excelled in behind-the-curtain deals with whoever was prepared to agree them, regardless of ideological leanings. Since the three-mandate Tarragona district allowed much room for alliance negotiations, Suelves skillfully exploited the opportunity by maintaining good relations with governmental circles, partidos turnistas and parties on the borderlines of the system alike. This is not to say he did not enjoy genuine electoral support at least in some municipalities, though it is unclear whether these were Carlist strongholds or rather strongholds of his political clientele. It seems that in general he was supported by two social groups: most rural peasants and ultraclerical electorate.

== Carlist politician ==
Carlist standard

Upon his return to Spain in 1893 Tamarit was nominated the movement leader for the province of Tarragona. At this post he contributed to transformation of Carlism into a modern structured organization, engineered by the national Jefe marqués de Cerralbo. Dubbed “l’home fort”, Suelevs threw himself into organizing local network, resulting in Tarragona province boasting more circulos and juntas than Navarre. In 1896-1897 he participated in preparatory works to Acta de Loredan. Scale of his contribution is unclear; the document cautiously endorsed papal social teachings, while Suelves nurtured definitely ultraconservative and reactionary views. As a politician perfectly well accommodated within the Restoration system and close collaborator of the non-belligerent Cerralbo, he voiced against violence during the La Octubrada crisis, though he probably formed part of a clandestine Tarragona junta collecting funds and arms for a would-be coup. He was spared any governmental repression afterwards.

In the first decade of the 20th century Tamarit emerged as one of the national Carlist leaders, though formally he headed the provincial Tarragona organization only, subordinated to the regional Catalan jefe. In 1901–1903, when poor health threatened leadership of the national Carlist leader Matías Barrio y Mier, Carlos VII intended to relieve the latter of some duties by creating an auxiliary Junta Central; Tamarit was nominated its member representing Catalonia and Aragon before the body was dissolved shortly afterwards. During the Ley de Jurisdicciones crisis Suelves advocated entering the Solidaritat Catalana alliance with Republicans and Nationalists in 1907, though his stance resulted from shrewd analysis of decreasing Traditionalist strength in the province and his natural penchant for alliances rather than from sympathy for Catalanism. Tamarit was always keen to defend traditional regional establishments, but voiced decisively against the Catalan nationalism.

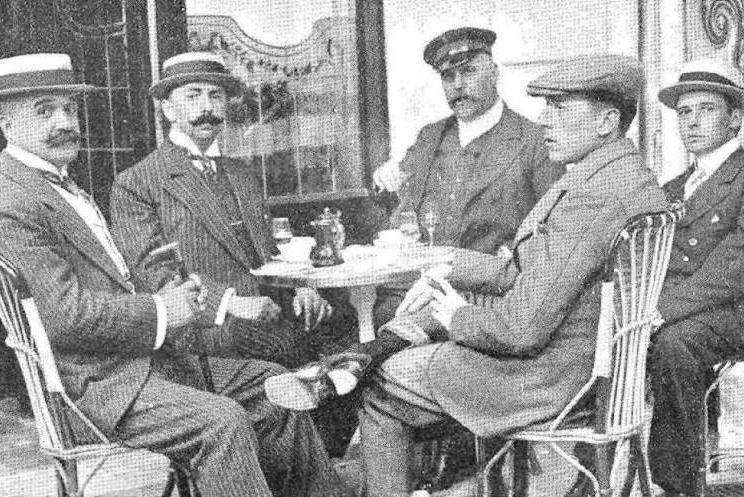
Tamarit (3fL) with his king (2fL), Biarritz 1908

When Juan Vázquez de Mella emerged as the leading Carlist theorist and most dynamic politician, former marques de Tamarit appreciated his intellectual and rhetorical skills, though he was skeptical as to his leadership potential and remained perplexed by him apparently sidetracking the official party leader Bartolome Feliu Perez and the new claimant, Don Jaime. On the other hand, some sources suggest that in 1911 Tamarit conspired against Feliu, though not as part of the unfolding Mellista plot, but out of his support for Cerralbo. During the mounting conflict between Mella and Don Jaime Suelves sided with the pretender. In 1917 he was entrusted with reorganization of the Tarragona branch, handing over shortly to Victor Olesa Fonollosa, former member of the local Diputació Tarrgona. In 1919, when most Catalan Carlist leaders joined the breakaway Mellistas, Suelves/Montserrat remained loyal to Don Jaime. During the Primo de Rivera dictatorship he did not hold any official positions, limiting himself to propaganda activities like gatherings of the ever-smaller group of combatants of the Third Carlist War.

== See also ==
- Carlism
- Electoral Carlism (Restoration)
- Restoration
- Altafulla castle
- Caciquismo
