= Electoral Carlism (Restoration) =

Political movement in Spain

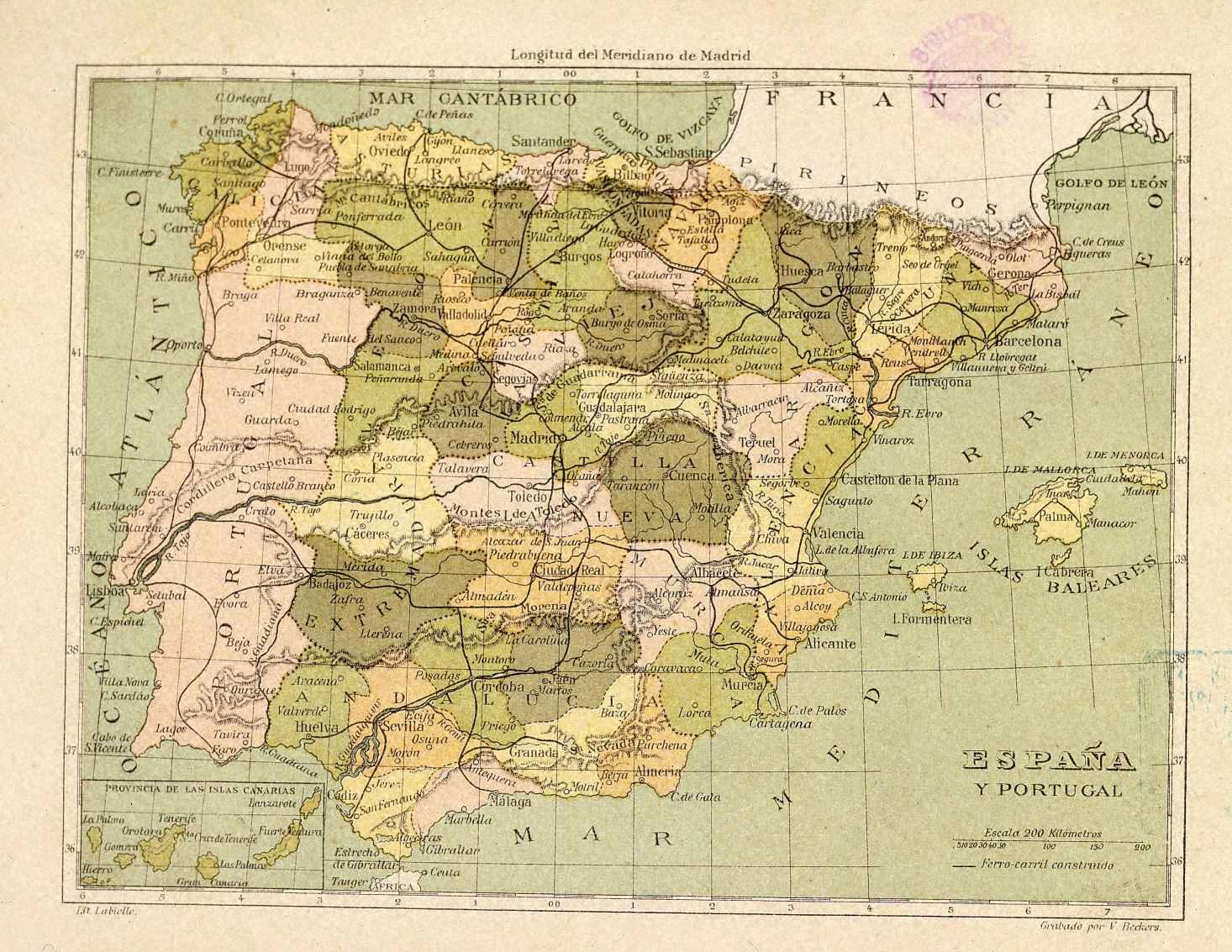
Spain, regions and provinces since 1833

Electoral Carlism of Restoration was vital to sustain Traditionalism in the period between the Third Carlist War and the Primo de Rivera dictatorship. Carlism, defeated in 1876, during the Restauración period recalibrated its focus from military action to political means and media campaigns. Accommodating themselves to political framework of the Alfonsine monarchy, the movement leaders considered elections, and especially elections to Congreso de los Diputados, primary vehicle of political mobilization. Though Carlist minority in the Cortes remained marginal and its impact on national politics was negligible, electoral campaigns were key to sustain the party until it regained momentum during the Second Spanish Republic.

== Electoral system ==
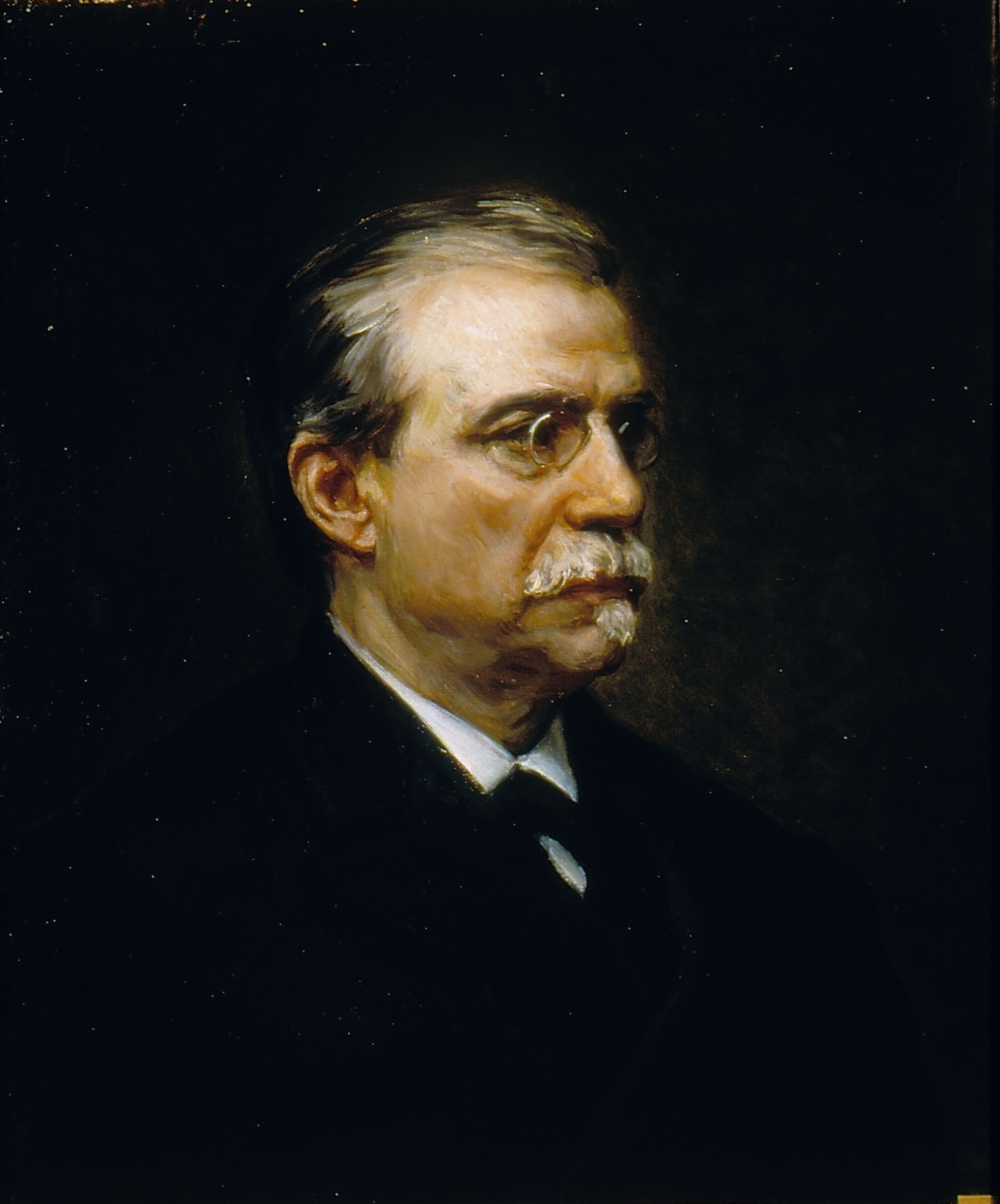
Antonio Cánovas, author of sistema turnista

The Spanish electoral system of the Restauración period envisioned that 1 deputy should represent around 50.000 inhabitants. The lower and the only fully electable chamber of the legislative, Congreso de los Diputados, was composed of around 400 deputies. Electoral districts were territorially roughly corresponding to existing judicial districts, though there could have been minor local differences. The districts were falling into two categories: 279 distritos rurales and 88 circunscripciones. The former were electing one deputy; the latter were electing a plurality of deputies, differing in number depending on the number of inhabitants; in these districts a voter was entitled to choose more than one candidate. In both types of districts mandates were assigned according to the first-past-the-post system. Though districts formed provinces and provinces were part of wider regiones, none of these two types of units played any role in the election process.

Until the 1886 election the eligible voters were Spanish male citizens above 25 years of age with appropriate material status, i.e. those who paid annual fees known as “contribución territorial” in rural areas or as “subsidio industrial” in case of urban residents. Starting the 1891 campaign the rights were granted to all males above 25 years, which increased the number of potential voters from 0.8m to 4.8m, the latter figure corresponding to 27% of the entire population. Spanish elections of the Restauración are marked by 2 distinct features: turnismo and caciquismo. According to the turnista routine, elections were organized by one of two rotating pre-appointed parties, Conservatives and Liberals, to ensure their parliamentary majority; the objective was achieved by a wide range of manipulations known as pucherazos. Caciquismo was the system of political corruption based on networks of local party bosses. Efficiency of both mechanisms decreased over time and varied across the country; rural areas were typically more prone to electoral fraud. Carlism functioned on the sidelines of the system, deprived of the privileges enjoyed by two partidos turnistas; though there were a few local Carlist bosses or even dynasties, in general caciquismo worked against the Carlist fortunes.

== General performance overview ==
Carlist votes
year	votes gathered	year	votes gathered
1879	536	1903	44,846
1881	2,197	1905	29,752
1884	did not run	1907	87,923
1886	456	1910	69,938
1891	24,549	1914	52,563
1893	45,617	1916	69,938
1896	43,286	1918	90,122
1898	40,481	1919	90,423
1899	11,915	1920	70,075
1901	45,576	1923	52,421

During the period of 1879-1923 general elections were held 20 times; the aggregate number of mandates available was 8,048. All branches of Traditionalism combined – the Carlists/Jaimists, the Integrists, the Mellists and the independent candidates - gained 145 mandates, which is 1,8% of the total; however, figures might differ across various scholarly works. This score positions the Traditionalists far behind two key political groupings of the Restoration era, the Conservatives and the Liberals; together with offshoot branches and related groups they seized above 3,500 mandates each. The Traditionalist result is also much worse than this recorded by various and usually highly ephemeral parties and electoral alliances falling into the generic republican-democratic rubric; on aggregate they won some 500 tickets. Traditionalism comes fourth, behind the Conservative, Liberal and Republican political currents. On the overall basis it won more seats than parties which gained dynamics in the 20th century: the Catalanists, the Basques or the Socialists.

Traditionalist performance measured in terms of the number of voters is difficult to gauge due to different factors, ranging from fraud and manipulation to peculiarities of electoral arithmetic. In the 1890s the aggregate number of votes obtained by Traditionalist deputies in each campaign hovered around 40,000, though given one should also include votes obtained by unsuccessful candidates the number was probably closer to 50,000; this would stand for some 1,7% of all active electorate. In the 20th century the combined number of votes received by victorious Traditionalists in each campaign was some 65,000 on average. In 1907, 1918 and 1919 it was rather around 90,000, which suggests that at best there might have been as many as 100,000 people voting Traditionalism, around 4% of the total active electorate. Though hardly an imposing figure, even in the early 1920s the Traditionalist electorate was by far larger than e.g. the Socialist one, as until the advent of Primo de Rivera dictatorship PSOE did not manage to attract more than 40,000 voters.

== Periodization ==
From the general Spanish perspective, the position of Carlists in the parliament underwent little if any change throughout all of the Restauración: the group formed an insignificant minority, ranging from barely noticeable to minor, and was in no way able to influence the course of national politics. It was only its most eloquent members that occasionally managed to make their presence felt. From the Carlist perspective, however, the size of their Cortes contingent differed enormously and could have been anything in the range between 1 and 16. Fluctuating fortunes of the movement at the polls stemmed to a large extent from their wavering performance in Navarre. In other regions their potential remained rather constant, as Vascongadas used to elect 2-3 MPs, Catalonia (except the 1907 campaign) 1-2 MPs and Old Castile 1 MP. Measured by the number of Carlist deputies present, the Restoration era falls into 4 sub-periods.

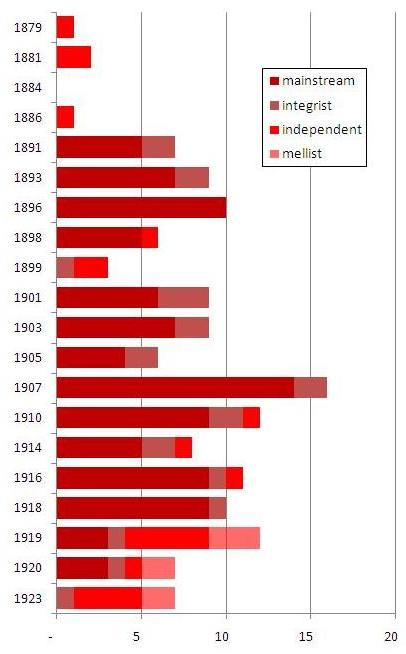
Traditionalist deputies

The years of 1879-1891 saw very few Carlist deputies, successful only as individuals - the first one elected baron de Sangarrén in 1879 - since officially the party did not participate in the elections. The movement, defeated during the Third Carlist War, suffered from results of military disaster and the ensuing repressions. With press titles suspended, circulos closed, holdings expropriated and supporters exiled Carlism was only gradually rebuilding its infrastructure. The recovery was made difficult by growing animosity between the claimant Carlos VII and the Nocedal father and son, resulting in the Integrist secession of 1888. As a result, up to 1891 there were only single deputies elected from Guipuzcoa, Álava and Biscay though there were also successful candidates from other parties, supported by the Carlists, and though Carlism dominated in local elections in some provinces.

The Nocedalista breakup triggered a more aggressive electoral policy, as both the Integrists and the mainstream Carlists tried to outpace each other. The year of 1891 marked their first official campaign. Demonstrating mutual and bitter hostility, both groups considered traditional Carlist enemies lesser evil; Carlos VII and Ramón Nocedal alike instructed their followers to seek alliance even with the Liberals if that was to produce defeat of their ex-fellow brethren. This approach started to change locally in the final years of the 19th century, in the 20th century both groups driven together by a joint opposition to new governmental laws. Nevertheless, between 1891 and 1907 both branches combined failed to gather more than 10 MPs in one term, the mainstream Carlism holding on aggregate 44 mandates and Integrism winning 12

The campaign of 1907 produced the best Carlist electoral score achieved during Restauración, which was the result of two factors. Traditionalism grew to almost total control of Navarre, where both branches grabbed 6 out of 7 mandates, willingly conceding the remaining one to Conservatives. In Catalonia the Carlists joined a regional alliance, which elevated the number of their Catalan MPs from the usual one or two to 6. Though the coalition fell apart few years later, it was in turn a rapid though ephemeral growth of the Valencian branch of the movement combined with continuous supremacy in Navarre and rapprochement with the Integrists which allowed Carlism to occupy 10-12 seats in the lower chamber of the Cortes through most of the terms until 1920.

The final years of 1920-1923 are marked by reduction of the minority. Another breakup within the movement, the Mellista secession, devastated Carlism, with a huge number of leaders and regional jefes joining the breakaways. In the traditional stronghold, Navarre, the policy of short-lived pivotal alliances – even with the Liberals – bewildered the electorate, and Carlism lost its grip on the province. Basque and Catalan movements were assuming increasingly cautious policy towards Carlism. Finally, the growth of new rivals, Republicans and Socialists, started to undercut whatever electoral support Carlists still enjoyed in the Northern and Eastern provinces. During the last campaign of 1923 Jaime III ordered abstention, quoting disillusionment as to the corrupted democracy.

== Program and alliances ==
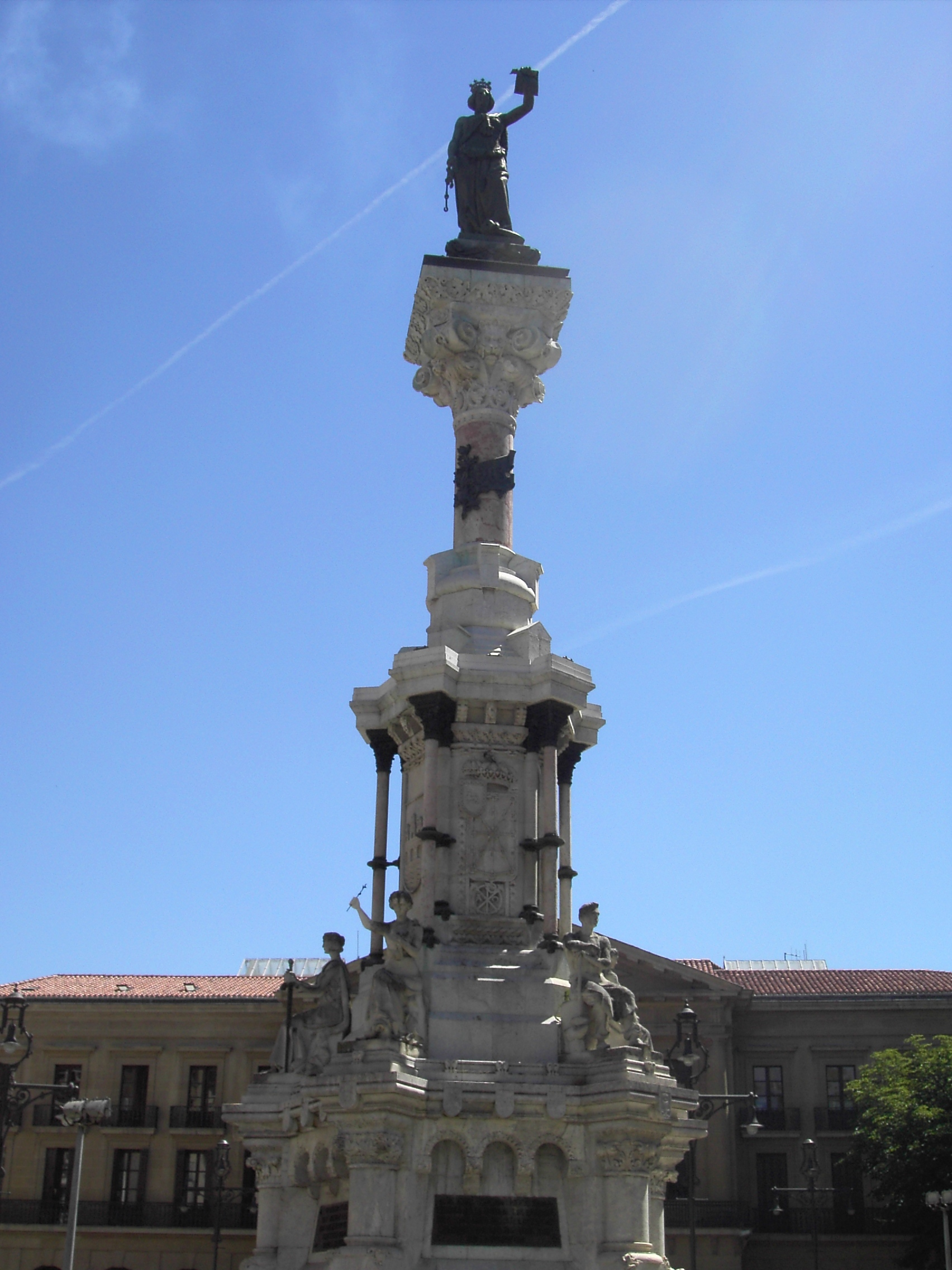
Fueros monument, Pamplona

Initially the Carlists preferred not to compete on an ideology-driven program and limited themselves to arguing that only Traditionalism would be a genuine representative of local interests in Madrid. Actually, it was the “Fueros” part of their ideario which was put on the forefront, materialized as support for the Fueristas in the 1880s, local regional alliances of the 1890s, Solidaritat Catalana of 1907 or Alianza Foral of the 1920s. However, support for traditional local establishments has never amounted to clear endorsement of autonomous designs for Vascongadas, Catalonia or any other region, which kept undermining the Carlists-Nationalist relations. Another typical feature of Traditionalist propaganda was defense of rights enjoyed by the Roman Catholic Church and constant references to Christian values. Carlists tried to obtain an exclusive “Catholic” license from the hierarchy and criticized alleged abuse and inflation of the term, granted by the bishops even to Liberal candidates. Dynastical claims were usually veiled and the party avoided open challenge of the Alfonsist rule.

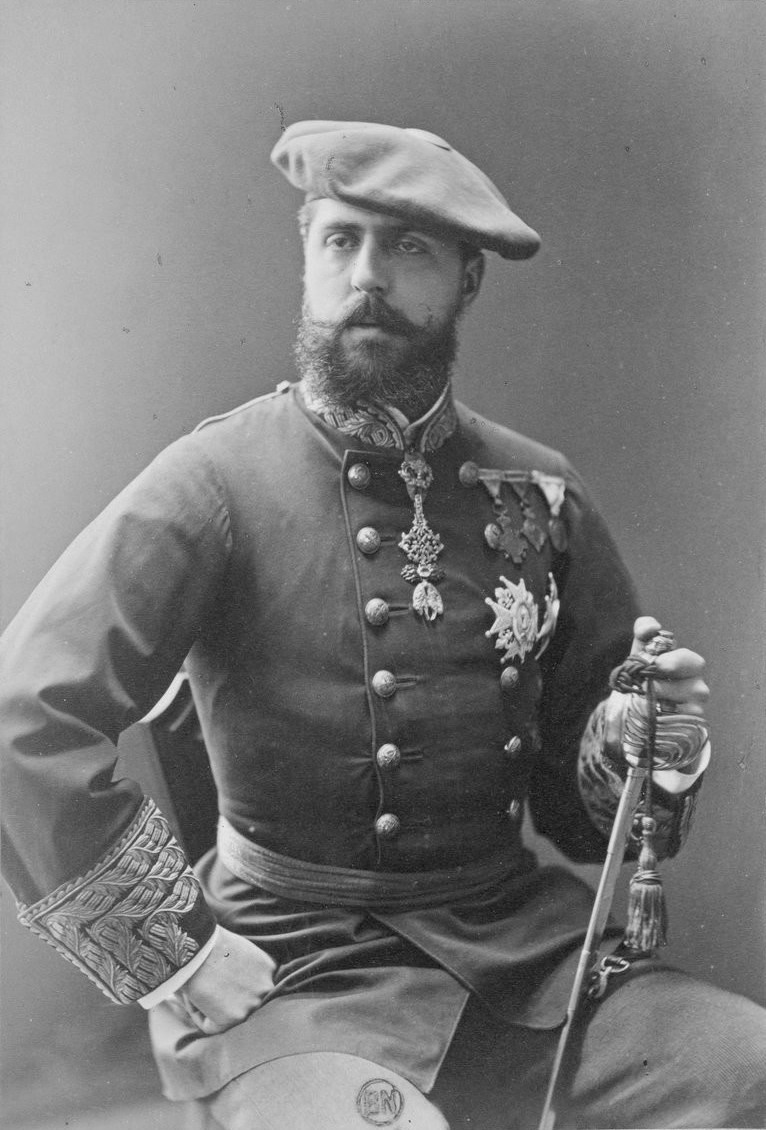
Carlos VII

As the turnista system degenerated, in the 20th century the Carlist propaganda focused increasingly on political corruption, presented as inevitable consequence of liberalism. Campaigns of Carlist candidates, always ultra-conservative and anti-democratic, at the turn of the centuries became even more reactionary and included increasingly frequent calls to defend traditional values against “red revolution”. In the late 1910s and early 1920s, with the Carlist policy of tactical alliances in full swing, they sidelined ideological threads again and shifted attention to practical issues. On the contrary, it was the Integrists who excelled in lambasting the Jaimistas for allying with the arch-enemies Liberals. Finally, the last years of Restauración were marked by outward rejection of the political system and “farsa parlamentaria”.

There was no clear Carlist system of alliances applicable through all of the Restauración period. Initially, when refraining from fielding own candidates themselves, the followers of Carlos VII sympathized mostly with right wing factions of the Conservatives, local groupings centred on defence of regional identities or with the independent Catholic candidates. The Liberals, victorious at battlefields, remained their arch-enemy.

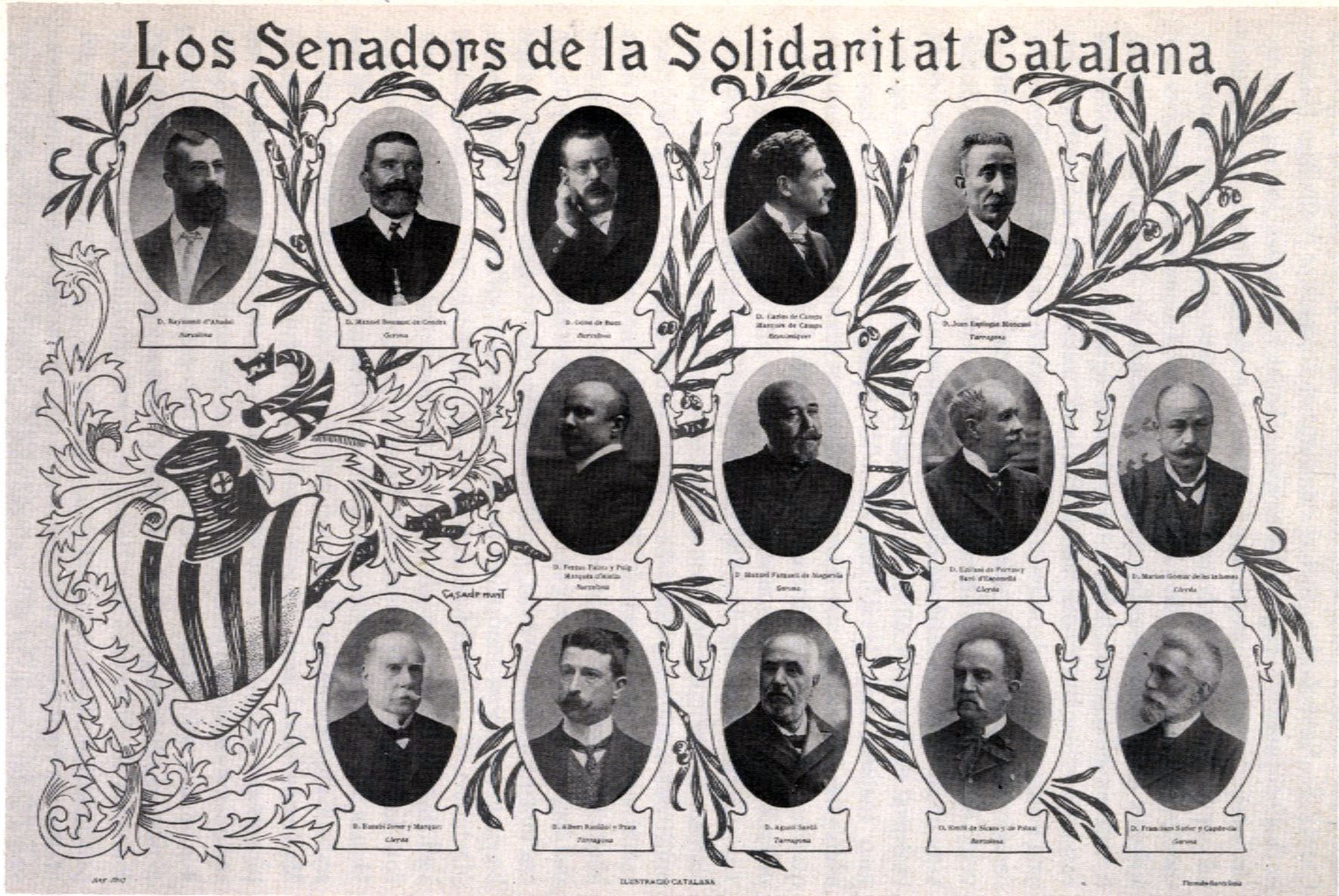
senators at Solidaritat Catalana postcard

The alliance pattern changed following the 1888 split; both groups considered each other primary enemy and contended with venomous hostility, occasionally supporting even the Liberals. Enmity turned into rapprochement in early 1899, first locally in Guipuzcoa, and later nationally. In early 20th century two factions allied again against the Liberals, particularly against Ley de Jurisdicciones. Opposition to liberal governments made Carlists swallow their enmity for Republicans and backtrack on their caution towards Catalanism; access to Solidaritat Catalana produced the largest Carlist parliamentary contingent in 1907, though the grouping fell apart few years later and its emulations elsewhere, like in Galicia or Asturias, were only moderately successful. Provincial alliances under a broad monarchist-Catholic-regional umbrella continued until around 1915, concluded mostly with Integristas, Mauristas and independent candidates, though there were skirmishes also among petty local Traditionalist factions. The last years of Restauración are marked by mainstream Carlism entering into pivotal tactical alliances, including those with the Liberals and Nationalists, concluded at the expense of the enraged Integristas. Finally, the Mellista secession divided Carlism further on.

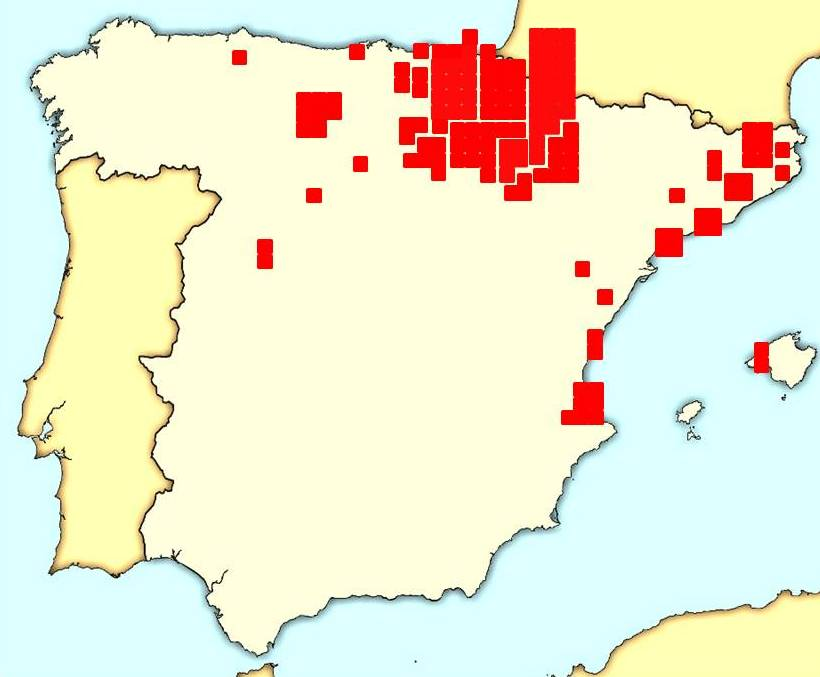
geography of Carlist deputies

== Geography ==
most Carlist districts
no	district	success
1	Azpeitia (Guipuzcoa)	85%
2	Tolosa (Guipuzcoa)	65%
3	Estella (Navarre)	60%
4	Aoiz (Navarre)	40%
4	Cervera de Pisuerga (Palencia)	40%
6	Pamplona (Navarre)	38%
7	Olot (Gerona)	30%
7	Laguardia (Alava)	30%
9	Tafalla (Navarre)	25%
10	Vich (Barcelona)	20%

Measured in terms of the number of Cortes mandates won, geographical support for Carlism during the Restoration period remained extremely uneven; it was absent in most of the country, minor though rather constant in some provinces, and thriving only in one area. In general, Carlism maintained some electoral potential in the North-Eastern crescent, ranging from the Bay of Biscay, along the Pyrenees to the Central Mediterranean coast.

The core of Carlist electoral background was formed by Vascongadas and Navarre, which elected 94 MPs (65% of all Traditionalists in the parliament). Navarre elected 35% of legitimist deputies and emerged as the only area where the movement dominated local political life. Though it was almost non-existent in the 1880s, by the end of the century Carlism controlled some 35-40% of the Navarrese mandates available; during the first two decades of the 20th century it emerged as a majoritarian force; with 60-80% of the mandates won in each campaign, it even acted as an arbiter on the local political scene, namely by means of alliances with other parties controlling the entire pool of seats assigned to the province. Within Navarre the Carlist stronghold was located in Estella district, the only one in the province (and one of 3 in Spain) where Carlism won on aggregate the majority of mandates available during the Restauración period. Two Vascongadas provinces where Carlism strove for domination were Guipuzcoa and Álava. In Guipuzcoa the movement obtained 33 mandates, which was 33% of all mandates available in the province throughout the period and 22% of all Carlist mandates won during the Restauración. Two local strongholds were rural districts of Azpeitia and Tolosa, which recorded the highest Carlist rate of success across all Spain. In the small Álava province the Traditionalists gained altogether 15% of the mandates available, though in local elections they used to dominate, especially during the 19th century. Another Vascongadas province, Biscay, was the area where sympathy for legitimist cause was rapidly deteriorating, twice electing a Carlist MP from Durango.

most Carlist regions
no	region	success
1	Navarre	36.4%
2	Vascongadas	15.7%
3	Catalonia	2.7%
4	Valencia	1.7%
5	Baleares	1.4%
6	Old Castile	1.3%
7	León	0.4%
7	Asturias	0.4%
9	Andalusia	0.0%
9	Aragon	0.0%
9	Canarias	0.0%
9	Extremadura	0.0%
9	Galicia	0.0%
9	Murcia	0.0%
9	New Castile	0.0%

most Carlist provinces
no	province	success
1	Navarre	36.4%
2	Guipuzcoa	33.0%
3	Álava	15.0%
4	Palencia	8.0%
5	Gerona	5.7%
6	Castellón	2.9%
7	Barcelona	2.5%
7	Tarragona	2.5%
9	Valencia	2.3%
10	Biscay	1.7%

The regions where Carlism merely made its presence visible (1-3% of mandates available) were Old Castile and the Levantine coast, covering Catalonia, Valencia and the Balearic Islands. In Catalonia the Traditionalists elected 23 deputies, which was the not marginal 16% of all legitimist MPs, but which amounted to only 3% of all the Catalan mandates available. Across the 4 provinces forming the region, in Gerona the Carlists got 6% of the mandates, in Barcelona and Tarragona 3%, and in Lerida this percentage dropped to a mere 1%. In most electoral campaigns (except 1907) Carlist share of Catalan seats hovered in the range of 2-5%. The most Carlist of all the Catalan districts was Olot, somewhat approached only by Vich. Valencia was way behind Catalonia in absolute terms (11) and in terms of success rate. Somewhat stronger in Castellón province (3%) than in Valencia province (2%), the Carlists could have boasted relative success in Nules and Valencia. The most successful for the Valencian Carlists was the campaign of 1919, when with 3 mandates won they took 9% share of the electoral prize. The small Baleares region elected 2 Carlist MPs from Palma. In Old Castile the Carlist position - 11 MPs and 1,3% of all mandates available - was mostly due to 8 triumphs in Cervera de Pisuerga, one of the 5 most Carlist electoral districts in the country, which also marked Palencia as one of the 5 most Carlist electoral provinces. In the provinces of Santander, Valladolid and Burgos the Carlists managed to elect one deputy.

There were 2 regions with 1-2 Carlist MPs elected, making the movement barely present though not really visible: León, and Asturias. In the North the Carlist share of mandates was below 1%. There were no Carlist deputies elected in the regions of Andalusia, Galicia, Aragon, New Castile, Murcia, Extremadura and Canary Islands. The movement was underrepresented in large urbanized constituencies; the 10 largest Spanish cities (with 10% of all population) elected 10 Carlist deputies, it is 7% of all Traditionalist MPs.

== Personalities ==
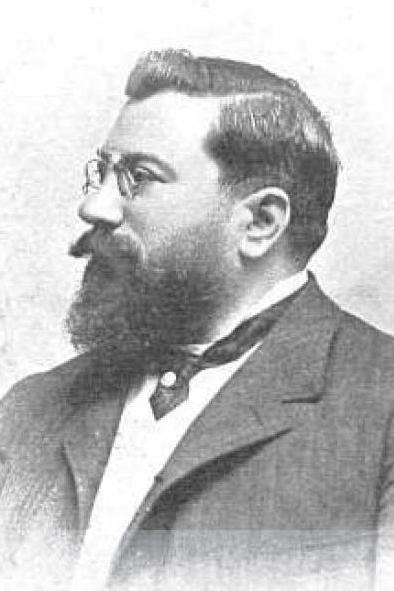
Vázquez de Mella

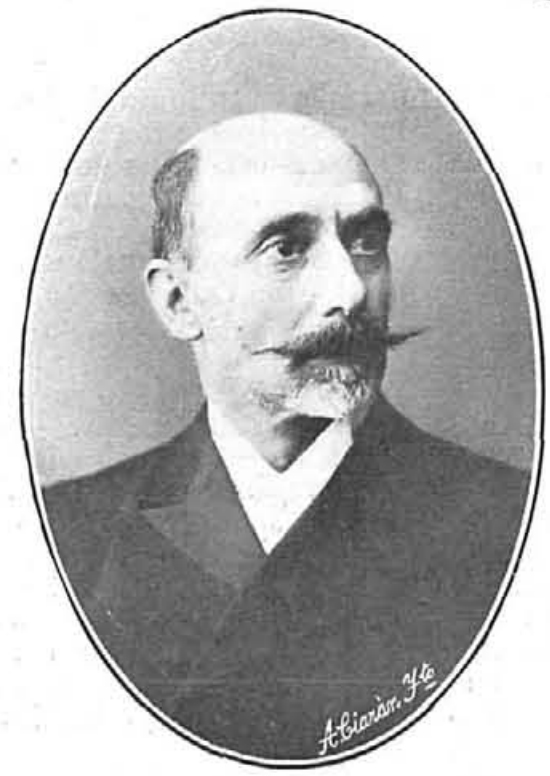
Llorens

There were 64 individuals elected as Carlist deputies throughout the Restoration period; some of them served only one term, and some were parliamentarian veterans. The 4 most-serving deputies held 25% of all Carlist mandates of the period. Lloréns was 3 times elected from Levantine districts, before serving 8 consecutive terms from the Navarrese Estella. Until today he remains the longest serving Carlist deputy ever (24 years), the longest continuously serving Carlist deputy ever (18 years) and the most-elected Carlist deputy ever (11 times). Vázquez de Mella was 7 times elected from Navarre and once representing Oviedo. Barrio served as Carlist political leader between 1899 and 1909; in the 1891-1909 period (except 1903–1905) he was elected from his native Palencian Cervera de Pisuerga and led the Carlist minority in the lower chamber. Senante represented the Integrist branch of the movement. Though an Alicantino, for 16 years he was continuously standing for Azpeitia and together with Llorens he holds the title of the most continuously elected Carlist deputy ever (8 times).

There was no rule as to Traditionalist political leaders competing for parliament. Candido Nocedal did not field his candidature after the 1876 defeat, marqués de Cerralbo had a seat guaranteed in the Senate by virtue of his grandeza de España, Matías Barrio did run between 1901 and 1907 (and lost in 1903), Bartolomé Feliú Pérez was successful in 1910, Pascual Comín did not compete in 1919, Luis Hernando de Larramendi lost in 1920 and marqués de Villores was obliged by the royal order of the Carlist king to abstain in 1923. Leaders of the breakaway Traditionalist factions tended to compete for parliamentary seat: the first Integrist jefe Ramón Nocedal was 4 times successful though he recorded also defeats, the successive one Juan Olazábal Ramery preferred to stay out of electoral campaigns. Following the secession from mainstream Carlism in 1919, Vázquez de Mella failed in his bid for the Cortes.

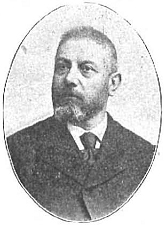
Barrio

most elected Carlists
no	name	elected
1	Joaquín Lloréns Fernández	11
2	Matías Barrio y Mier	8
2	Manuel Senante Martínez	8
2	Juan Vázquez de Mella	8
5	Luis García Guijarro	5
5	Cesáreo Sanz Escartín	5
5	Ramón Nocedal y Romea	5
8	Narciso Batlle y Baró	4
8	Tomás Domínguez Romera	4
8	Pedro Llosas Badía	4
8	José Sánchez Marco	4
8	Josep de Suelves i de Montagut	4
13	Joaquín Baleztena Ascárate	3
13	Esteban Bilbao Eguía	3
13	Miguel Irigaray Gorría	3
13	Víctor Pradera Larumbe	3

Three times there were two generations serving as Carlist MPs. Chronologically first are the Ortiz de Zarate father and son, Ramón and Enrique, both representing the Alavese Vitoria in the 19th century. Then come the Ampuero father and son, José María and José Joaquín, from Durango. The Dominguez father and son, Tomas and Tomás, stood for the Navarrese district of Aoiz. There are only 5 cases of individuals serving in the parliament before and after the Third Carlist War. Some of the politicians who started their deputy career during Restoration served in the Cortes until the late 1960s, the best known case being this of Esteban Bilbao, the future president of the Francoist quasi-parliament; his first and his last days in the legislative are spanned by the time distance of 49 years.

There were cases of Carlist deputies acquiring their seat with no competition during the elections. They were most frequent in Navarre (8 times), where periodically in Estella and Aoiz districts potential counter-candidates acknowledged Carlist supremacy and did not even bother to compete, though sporadically the notorious Article 29 was applied also elsewhere (e.g. in favor of Senante in the Guipuzcoan Azpeitia or in favor of Llosas Badia in the Catalan Olot). Joaquín Llorens recorded the most triumphant victory, conquering 99,51% of votes cast in 1907. None of the studies consulted offers any detailed and systematic personal profiling. The information available suggests that Carlist deputies were usually landowners, lawyers, academics and journalists, with rather few entrepreneurs, officials and military men. Most of them commenced the Cortes career in their 30s.

== Success factors ==
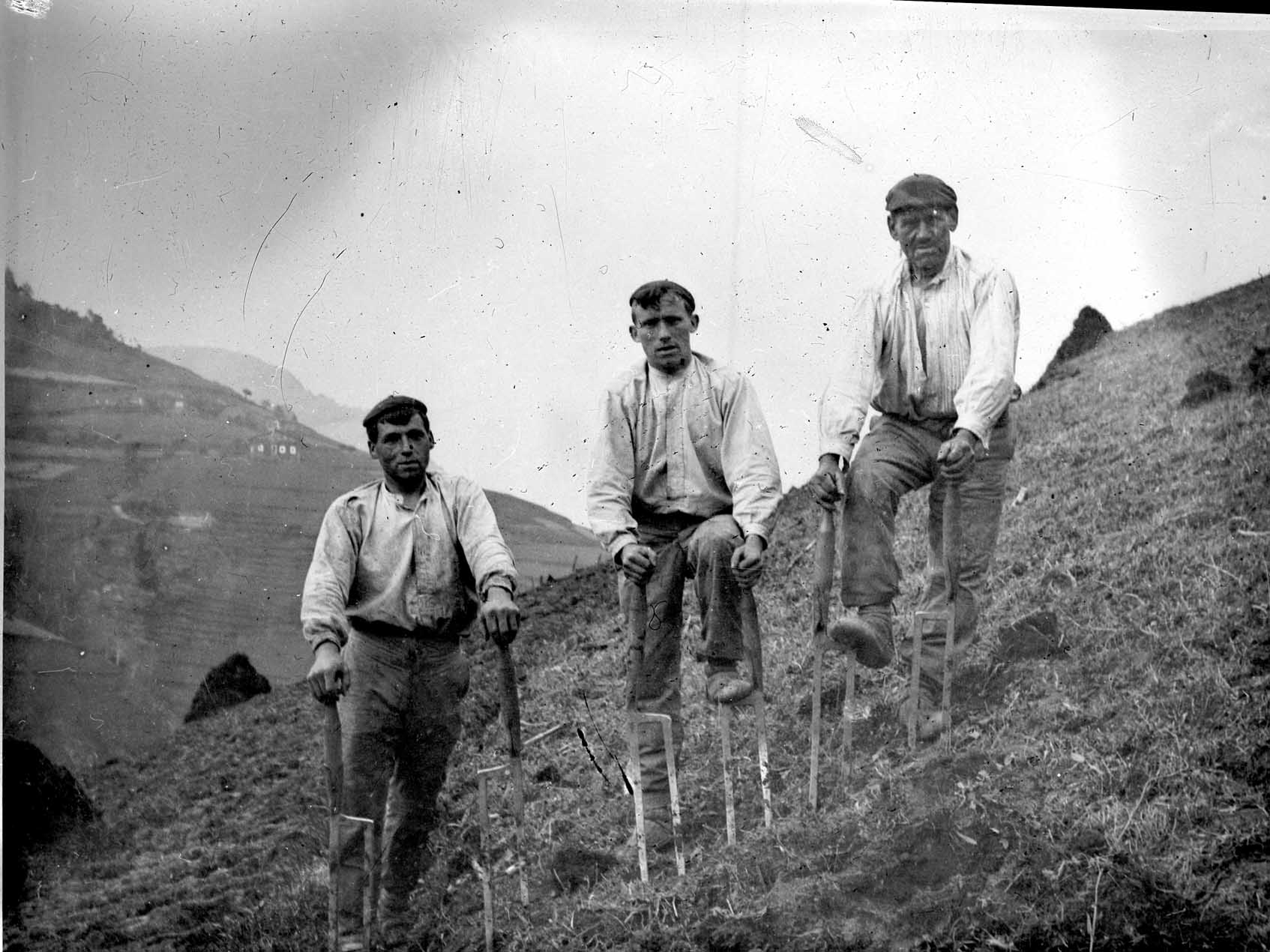
farmers from Guipuzcoa

Many students striving to analyze the Carlist popularity (or lack of thereof) point to socio-economic conditions, though conclusions offered by scholars from this school could be contradictory. The prevailing opinion holds that the movement flourished in rural areas with large commons and dominated by middle-size holdings, at least self-sustainable but usually able to enter the market exchange. This type of units provided economic grounds for peasant owners, the social base of Carlism, and was frequent in the Northern belt of Spain. Whenever this social group was giving way to peasant owners of small, non-sustainable plots, landless peasants, tenants or jornaleros, the rural workers – like was the case in New Castile or Andalusia, home to many Spanish landowners – Carlism was losing its base. In industrialized areas the ensuing social mobility was undermining traditional life patterns and undercutting the Carlist popularity. Rapidly growing urban proletariat, though not entirely immune to Carlist propaganda, tended to embrace anarchism and socialism instead.

Another group of determinants listed is related to culture and religion. It is noted that Carlism was strongly linked to religiosity, most fervent in the Northern provinces; destitute peasant masses in Extremadura, Andalusia or New Castile have largely ceased to be Catholic. Population groups demonstrating religious apathy or outward hostility, like socially mobile middle-class professionals dominating culturally and politically in urban communities during the early Restauración, are held responsible for trailing Carlist popularity in the cities. In the 20th century it was the class of industrial workers which became liable for growing secularization of large metropolitan areas and the Carlist lack of appeal in Madrid, Barcelona, Seville, Málaga, Zaragoza or Bilbao. The ensuing Carlist anti-urbanism should not be applied universally, though; some scholars note that in parts of Spain like Galicia the movement was absent in rural areas and remained sustained only in middle-size cities, like this of Ourense.

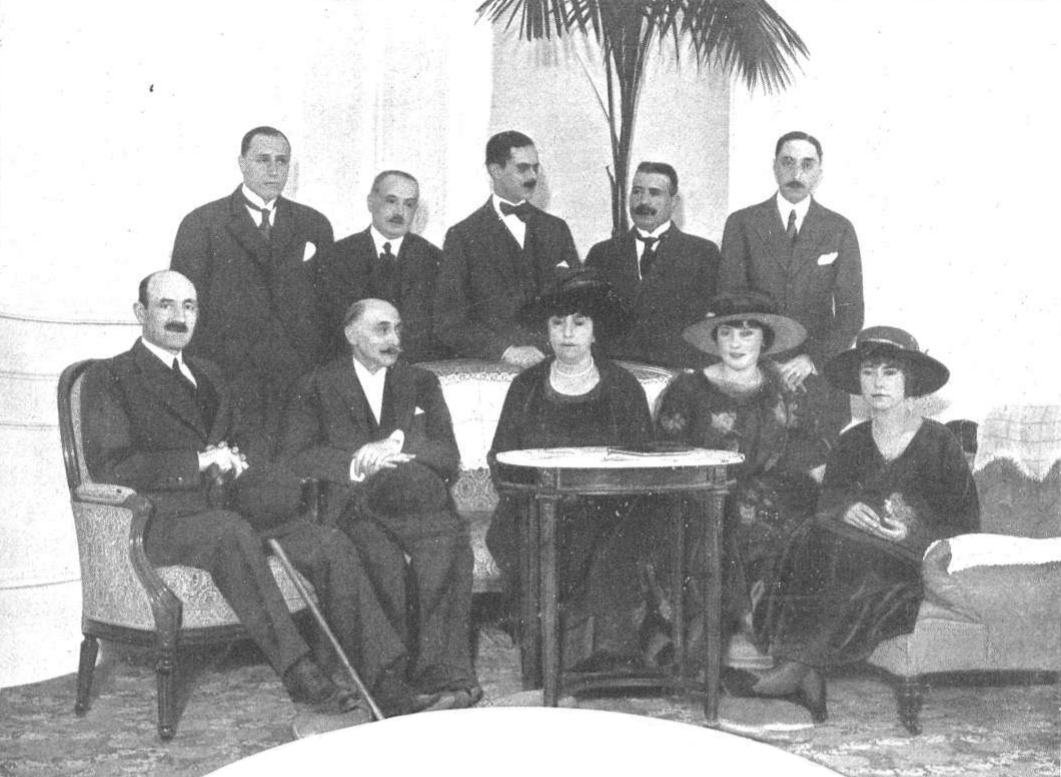
Carlist members of Parliament with Doña Beatriz, Don Jaime's sister, 1918

Scholars focusing on Carlism and regional movements agree that until some point the two sustained each other. The discussion is mostly about whether they started to part when regional identities gave way to ethnic threads or even later, when conscious ethnic communities embraced national and political claims. It is also not clear why the interaction was material in some regions, while in the other – like Galicia – it remained marginal. Carlist historiography of the last decades seems marked by increasing skepticism towards socio-economic conditions being put on the forefront, now suspected of schematic Darwinism and oversimplifications. One reviewer underlines emergence of “nueva historia política”, backed by focus on family interaction patterns, collective mentality, religious and moral values, anthropological factors like customs and other elements described as “microsystems of daily life”. Another notes an apparent return of political analysis as a primary investigation key. One more prefers to analyse semiotics of culture discourse as key to understanding of Carlist popularity - also in terms of electoral efforts - among the underprivileged.

== See also ==
- Carlism
- Electoral Carlism (Second Republic)
- Carlo-francoism
- Integrism (Spain)
- Mellismo
- Restoration
- Navarrese electoral Carlism
- Turno

== Appendix. Carlist deputies, 1879–1923 ==
Carlist Coat of Arms

year	name	branch	district	province	region
1881	ORTIZ DE ZARATE MARTINEZ DE GALARRETA, RAMON	independent	Vitoria	Álava	Vascongadas
1896	ORTIZ DE ZARATE Y VAZQUEZ QUEIPO, ENRIQUE	mainstream Carlism	Vitoria	Álava	Vascongadas
1903	MAZARRASA Y QUINTANILLA, ANTONIO	mainstream Carlism	Laguardia	Álava	Vascongadas
1910	MAZARRASA Y QUINTANILLA, ANTONIO	independent	Laguardia	Álava	Vascongadas
1907	ALCOCER Y VALDERRAMA, CELESTINO	mainstream Carlism	Laguardia	Álava	Vascongadas
1910	ALCOCER Y VALDERRAMA, CELESTINO	mainstream Carlism	Vitoria	Álava	Vascongadas
1918	ARTINANO Y GALDACANO, GERVASIO DE	mainstream Carlism	Laguardia	Álava	Vascongadas
1919	ARTINANO Y GALDACANO, GERVASIO DE	independent	Laguardia	Álava	Vascongadas
1893	GUAL DONS Y TORRELLA, FAUSTO	mainstream Carlism	Palma	Baleares	Baleares
1898	VILLALONGA DESPUIG, FELIPE	independent	Palma	Baleares	Baleares
1891	LLANZA Y PIGNATELLI, MANUEL DE	mainstream Carlism	Vich	Barcelona	Catalonia
1891	LLAUDER Y DALMASES, LUIS MARIA DE	mainstream Carlism	Berga	Barcelona	Catalonia
1918	GONZALEZ DE CAREAGA Y URQUIJO, IGNACIO	mainstream Carlism	Burgos	Burgos	Old Castile
1893	LLORENS Y FERNANDEZ DE CORDOBA, JOAQUIN	mainstream Carlism	Morella	Castellón	Valencia
1919	CHICHARRO SANCHEZ GUIO, JAIME	independent	Nules	Castellón	Valencia
1919	MANGLANO Y CUCALO DE MONTULL, JOAQUIN	independent	Albocácer	Castellón	Valencia
1920	CHICHARRO SANCHEZ GUIO, JAIME	independent	Nules	Castellón	Valencia
1896	LLORENS Y FERNANDEZ DE CORDOBA, JOAQUIN	mainstream Carlism	Olot	Gerona	Catalonia
1898	LLORENS Y FERNANDEZ DE CORDOBA, JOAQUIN	mainstream Carlism	Olot	Gerona	Catalonia
1907	BOFARULL Y DE PALAU, MANUEL DE	mainstream Carlism	Vilademuls	Gerona	Catalonia
1907	LLOSAS BADIA, PEDRO	mainstream Carlism	Olot	Gerona	Catalonia
1910	IGLESIAS GARCIA, DALMACIO	mainstream Carlism	Gerona	Gerona	Catalonia
1910	LLOSAS BADIA, PEDRO	mainstream Carlism	Olot	Gerona	Catalonia
1914	LLOSAS BADIA, PEDRO	mainstream Carlism	Olot	Gerona	Catalonia
1916	LLOSAS BADIA, PEDRO	mainstream Carlism	Olot	Gerona	Catalonia
1879	ALTARRIBA Y VILLANUEVA, RAMON	independent	Azpeitia	Guipuzcoa	Vascongadas
1886	ALTARRIBA Y VILLANUEVA, RAMON	independent	Azpeitia	Guipuzcoa	Vascongadas
1891	RAMERY Y ZUZUARREGUI, LIBORIO	Integrism	Zumaya	Guipuzcoa	Vascongadas
1891	REZUSTA Y AVENDAÑO, BENIGNO	mainstream Carlism	Tolosa	Guipuzcoa	Vascongadas
1893	ZUBIZARRETA OLAVARRIA, EUSEBIO	mainstream Carlism	Tolosa	Guipuzcoa	Vascongadas
1896	ARANA Y BELAUSTEGUI, JOAQUIN MARIA DE	mainstream Carlism	Azpeitia	Guipuzcoa	Vascongadas
1901	ALDAMA Y MENDIVIL, ANTONIO DE	Integrism	Azpeitia	Guipuzcoa	Vascongadas
1896	ZUBIZARRETA OLAVARRIA, EUSEBIO	mainstream Carlism	Tolosa	Guipuzcoa	Vascongadas
1899	OLAZABAL Y RAMERY, JUAN DE	Integrism	Azpeitia	Guipuzcoa	Vascongadas
1899	PRADERA LARRUMBE, JUAN VICTOR	independent	Tolosa	Guipuzcoa	Vascongadas
1901	PRADERA LARRUMBE, JUAN VICTOR	mainstream Carlism	Tolosa	Guipuzcoa	Vascongadas
1903	ARANA Y BELAUSTEGUI, TEODORO	mainstream Carlism	Azpeitia	Guipuzcoa	Vascongadas
1903	URQUIJO IBARRA, JULIO	mainstream Carlism	Tolosa	Guipuzcoa	Vascongadas
1907	DIAZ AGUADO Y SALABERRY, RAFAEL	mainstream Carlism	Tolosa	Guipuzcoa	Vascongadas
1910	DIAZ AGUADO Y SALABERRY, RAFAEL	mainstream Carlism	Tolosa	Guipuzcoa	Vascongadas
1916	BILBAO Y EGUIA, ESTEBAN	mainstream Carlism	Tolosa	Guipuzcoa	Vascongadas
1918	BILBAO Y EGUIA, ESTEBAN	mainstream Carlism	Tolosa	Guipuzcoa	Vascongadas
1920	OREJA ELOSEGUI, RICARDO	Mellism	Tolosa	Guipuzcoa	Vascongadas
1923	OREJA ELOSEGUI, RICARDO	Mellism	Tolosa	Guipuzcoa	Vascongadas
1923	URIZAR Y EGUIAZU, JUAN	independent	Vergara	Guipuzcoa	Vascongadas
1907	ALIER Y CASSI, LORENZO MARIA	mainstream Carlism	Cervera	Lérida	Catalonia
1891	SANZ Y ESCARTIN, ROMUALDO CESAREO	mainstream Carlism	Pamplona	Navarre	Navarre
1893	SANZ Y ESCARTIN, ROMUALDO CESAREO	mainstream Carlism	Pamplona	Navarre	Navarre
1893	VAZQUEZ DE MELLA Y FANJUL, JUAN	mainstream Carlism	Estella	Navarre	Navarre
1896	IRIGARAY Y GORRIA, MIGUEL	mainstream Carlism	Tudela	Navarre	Navarre
1896	SANZ Y ESCARTIN, ROMUALDO CESAREO	mainstream Carlism	Pamplona	Navarre	Navarre
1896	VAZQUEZ DE MELLA Y FANJUL, JUAN	mainstream Carlism	Estella	Navarre	Navarre
1898	SANZ Y ESCARTIN, ROMUALDO CESAREO	mainstream Carlism	Pamplona	Navarre	Navarre
1898	VAZQUEZ DE MELLA Y FANJUL, JUAN	mainstream Carlism	Estella	Navarre	Navarre
1901	NOCEDAL Y ROMEA, RAMON	Integrism	Pamplona	Navarre	Navarre
1901	IRIGARAY Y GORRIA, MIGUEL	mainstream Carlism	Aoiz	Navarre	Navarre
1901	LLORENS Y FERNANDEZ DE CORDOBA, JOAQUIN	mainstream Carlism	Estella	Navarre	Navarre
1901	SANZ Y ESCARTIN, ROMUALDO CESAREO	mainstream Carlism	Pamplona	Navarre	Navarre
1903	BRETON RADA, FRANCISCO	mainstream Carlism	Tafalla	Navarre	Navarre
1903	GIL ROBLES, ENRIQUE	mainstream Carlism	Pamplona	Navarre	Navarre
1903	IRIGARAY Y GORRIA, MIGUEL	mainstream Carlism	Aoiz	Navarre	Navarre
1903	LLORENS Y FERNANDEZ DE CORDOBA, JOAQUIN	mainstream Carlism	Estella	Navarre	Navarre
1905	DOMINGUEZ ROMERA PEREZ DE POMAR, TOMAS	mainstream Carlism	Aoiz	Navarre	Navarre
1905	LLORENS Y FERNANDEZ DE CORDOBA, JOAQUIN	mainstream Carlism	Estella	Navarre	Navarre
1905	VAZQUEZ DE MELLA Y FANJUL, JUAN	mainstream Carlism	Pamplona	Navarre	Navarre
1907	CASTILLO DE PIÑEYRO, EDUARDO	mainstream Carlism	Tudela	Navarre	Navarre
1907	DOMINGUEZ ROMERA PEREZ DE POMAR, TOMAS	mainstream Carlism	Aoiz	Navarre	Navarre
1907	FELIU Y PEREZ, BARTOLOME	mainstream Carlism	Tafalla	Navarre	Navarre
1907	LLORENS Y FERNANDEZ DE CORDOBA, JOAQUIN	mainstream Carlism	Estella	Navarre	Navarre
1907	VAZQUEZ DE MELLA Y FANJUL, JUAN	mainstream Carlism	Pamplona	Navarre	Navarre
1910	DOMINGUEZ ROMERA PEREZ DE POMAR, TOMAS	mainstream Carlism	Aoiz	Navarre	Navarre
1910	FELIU Y PEREZ, BARTOLOME	mainstream Carlism	Tafalla	Navarre	Navarre
1910	LLORENS Y FERNANDEZ DE CORDOBA, JOAQUIN	mainstream Carlism	Estella	Navarre	Navarre
1910	SAENZ FERNANDEZ, LORENZO	mainstream Carlism	Tudela	Navarre	Navarre
1910	VAZQUEZ DE MELLA Y FANJUL, JUAN	mainstream Carlism	Pamplona	Navarre	Navarre
1914	DOMINGUEZ ROMERA PEREZ DE POMAR, TOMAS	mainstream Carlism	Aoiz	Navarre	Navarre
1914	LLORENS Y FERNANDEZ DE CORDOBA, JOAQUIN	mainstream Carlism	Estella	Navarre	Navarre
1914	MARTINEZ Y LOPE GARCIA, GABINO	mainstream Carlism	Pamplona	Navarre	Navarre
1914	VAZQUEZ DE MELLA Y FANJUL, JUAN	mainstream Carlism	Pamplona	Navarre	Navarre
1916	DOMINGUEZ AREVALO, TOMAS	mainstream Carlism	Aoiz	Navarre	Navarre
1916	LLORENS Y FERNANDEZ DE CORDOBA, JOAQUIN	mainstream Carlism	Estella	Navarre	Navarre
1916	MARTINEZ Y LOPE GARCIA, GABINO	mainstream Carlism	Tafalla	Navarre	Navarre
1916	SANTESTEBAN SALVADOR, JUAN	mainstream Carlism	Pamplona	Navarre	Navarre
1918	DOMINGUEZ AREVALO, TOMAS	mainstream Carlism	Aoiz	Navarre	Navarre
1918	LLORENS Y FERNANDEZ DE CORDOBA, JOAQUIN	mainstream Carlism	Estella	Navarre	Navarre
1918	PRADERA LARRUMBE, JUAN VICTOR	mainstream Carlism	Pamplona	Navarre	Navarre
1919	BALEZTENA Y AZCARATE, JOAQUIN	mainstream Carlism	Pamplona	Navarre	Navarre
1920	BALEZTENA Y AZCARATE, JOAQUIN	mainstream Carlism	Pamplona	Navarre	Navarre
1920	BILBAO Y EGUIA, ESTEBAN	mainstream Carlism	Estella	Navarre	Navarre
1923	BALEZTENA Y AZCARATE, JOAQUIN	independent	Pamplona	Navarre	Navarre
1916	VAZQUEZ DE MELLA Y FANJUL, JUAN	mainstream Carlism	Oviedo	Oviedo	Asturias
1891	BARRIO Y MIER, MATIAS	mainstream Carlism	Cervera De Pisuerga	Palencia	Old Castile
1893	BARRIO Y MIER, MATIAS	mainstream Carlism	Cervera De Pisuerga	Palencia	Old Castile
1896	BARRIO Y MIER, MATIAS	mainstream Carlism	Cervera De Pisuerga	Palencia	Old Castile
1898	BARRIO Y MIER, MATIAS	mainstream Carlism	Cervera De Pisuerga	Palencia	Old Castile
1899	BARRIO Y MIER, MATIAS	independent	Cervera De Pisuerga	Palencia	Old Castile
1901	BARRIO Y MIER, MATIAS	mainstream Carlism	Cervera De Pisuerga	Palencia	Old Castile
1905	BARRIO Y MIER, MATIAS	mainstream Carlism	Cervera De Pisuerga	Palencia	Old Castile
1907	BARRIO Y MIER, MATIAS	mainstream Carlism	Cervera De Pisuerga	Palencia	Old Castile
1893	AGUILERA Y GAMBOA, GONZALO DE	mainstream Carlism	Laguardia	Álava	Vascongadas
1903	SANCHEZ DEL CAMPO, JUAN ANTONIO	Integrism	Salamanca	Salamanca	León
1916	SOLANA Y GONZALEZ CAMINO, MARCIAL	independent	Santander	Santander	Old Castile
1896	SUELVES MONTAGUT, JOSE DE	mainstream Carlism	Tarragona	Tarragona	Catalonia
1901	SUELVES MONTAGUT, JOSE DE	mainstream Carlism	Tarragona	Tarragona	Catalonia
1907	SUELVES MONTAGUT, JOSE DE	mainstream Carlism	Tarragona	Tarragona	Catalonia
1896	POLO Y PEYROLON, MANUEL	mainstream Carlism	Valencia	Valencia	Valencia
1914	SIMO MARIN, MANUEL	mainstream Carlism	Valencia	Valencia	Valencia
1916	GARCIA GUIJARRO, LUIS	mainstream Carlism	Valencia	Valencia	Valencia
1923	GARCIA GUIJARRO, LUIS	Mellism	Valencia	Valencia	Valencia
1918	GARCIA GUIJARRO, LUIS	mainstream Carlism	Valencia	Valencia	Valencia
1881	AMPUERO Y JAUREGUI, JOSE MARIA	independent	Durango	Biscay	Vascongadas
1916	AMPUERO Y DEL RIO, JOSE JOAQUIN	mainstream Carlism	Durango	Biscay	Vascongadas
1905	SANCHEZ MARCO, JOSE	Integrism	Azpeitia	Guipuzcoa	Vascongadas
1907	SENANTE Y MARTINEZ, MANUEL	Integrism	Azpeitia	Guipuzcoa	Vascongadas
1910	SENANTE Y MARTINEZ, MANUEL	Integrism	Azpeitia	Guipuzcoa	Vascongadas
1914	SENANTE Y MARTINEZ, MANUEL	Integrism	Azpeitia	Guipuzcoa	Vascongadas
1916	SENANTE Y MARTINEZ, MANUEL	Integrism	Azpeitia	Guipuzcoa	Vascongadas
1918	SENANTE Y MARTINEZ, MANUEL	Integrism	Azpeitia	Guipuzcoa	Vascongadas
1919	SENANTE Y MARTINEZ, MANUEL	Integrism	Azpeitia	Guipuzcoa	Vascongadas
1920	SENANTE Y MARTINEZ, MANUEL	Integrism	Azpeitia	Guipuzcoa	Vascongadas
1923	SENANTE Y MARTINEZ, MANUEL	Integrism	Azpeitia	Guipuzcoa	Vascongadas
1893	CAMPION Y JAIMEBON, ARTURO	Integrism	Pamplona	Navarre	Navarre
1903	NOCEDAL Y ROMEA, RAMON	Integrism	Pamplona	Navarre	Navarre
1905	NOCEDAL Y ROMEA, RAMON	Integrism	Pamplona	Navarre	Navarre
1891	NOCEDAL Y ROMEA, RAMON	Integrism	Azpeitia	Guipuzcoa	Vascongadas
1893	NOCEDAL Y ROMEA, RAMON	Integrism	Azpeitia	Guipuzcoa	Vascongadas
1907	SANCHEZ MARCO, JOSE	Integrism	Pamplona	Navarre	Navarre
1910	SANCHEZ MARCO, JOSE	Integrism	Pamplona	Navarre	Navarre
1914	SANCHEZ MARCO, JOSE	Integrism	Pamplona	Navarre	Navarre
1923	GARRAN Y MOSO, JUSTO	independent	Tafalla	Navarre	Navarre
1901	SANCHEZ DEL CAMPO, JUAN ANTONIO	Integrism	Salamanca	Salamanca	León
1898	SUELVES MONTAGUT, JOSE DE	mainstream Carlism	Tarragona	Tarragona	Catalonia
1919	GARRAN Y MOSO, JUSTO	independent	Valladolid	Valladolid	Old Castile
1919	GONZALEZ DE CAREAGA Y URQUIJO, IGNACIO	Mellism	Tolosa	Guipuzcoa	Vascongadas
1919	JUARISTI Y LANDAIDA, JOSE MARIA DE	Mellism	Vergara	Guipuzcoa	Vascongadas
1919	GARCIA GUIJARRO, LUIS	Mellism	Valencia	Valencia	Valencia
1920	GARCIA GUIJARRO, LUIS	Mellism	Valencia	Valencia	Valencia
1907	BORDAS FLAQUER, MARIANO	mainstream Carlism	Berga	Barcelona	Catalonia
1907	JUNYENT ROVIRA, MIGUEL	mainstream Carlism	Vich	Barcelona	Catalonia
1918	BATLLE Y BARO, NARCISO	mainstream Carlism	Barcelona	Barcelona	Catalonia
1918	TRIAS Y COMAS, BARTOLOME	mainstream Carlism	Vich	Barcelona	Catalonia
1919	BATLLE Y BARO, NARCISO	mainstream Carlism	Barcelona	Barcelona	Catalonia
1919	TRIAS Y COMAS, BARTOLOME	mainstream Carlism	Vich	Barcelona	Catalonia
1907	LAMAMIE DE CLAIRAC Y TRESPALACIOS, JUAN	Integrism	Salamanca	Salamanca	León
1920	BATLLE Y BARO, NARCISO	mainstream Carlism	Barcelona	Barcelona	Catalonia
1923	BATLLE Y BARO, NARCISO	independent	Barcelona	Barcelona	Catalonia

source: Índice Histórico de Diputados at official Cortes service. For division into branches, see footnote #28
