= José Corbató Chillida =

Spanish priest (1862–1913)

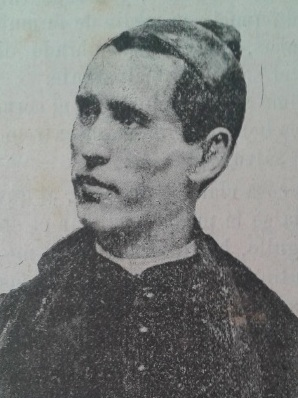
- Corbató in 1896
- Born: José Pascual Corbató Chillida; 1862; Benlloc, Spain
- Died: 1913 (aged 50–51); Benimàmet, Spain
- Occupations: Priest; journalist
- Known for: Publisher
- Political party: Carlism

José Pascual Corbató Chillida (1862–1913), known also as José Domingo Corbató or Padre Corbató or Francisco María Cruz, was a Spanish Roman Catholic priest. Between 1891 and 1912, he animated 7 local and short-lived Valencian periodicals. In the mid-1890s, he was briefly catapulted to celebrity status when he was trialed for asserting that the regent Maria Christina was leading the Spanish freemasonry. Politically, Corbató initially sided with Carlism and was its vehement propagandist. In the 20th century, he developed his own political doctrine: Traditionalism formulated in highly providentialist and millenarian terms. In historiography, his political trajectory is considered typical for some disintegration patterns within Carlism; Corbató himself is viewed as representative of a heterodox breed of españolismo.

== Family and youth ==
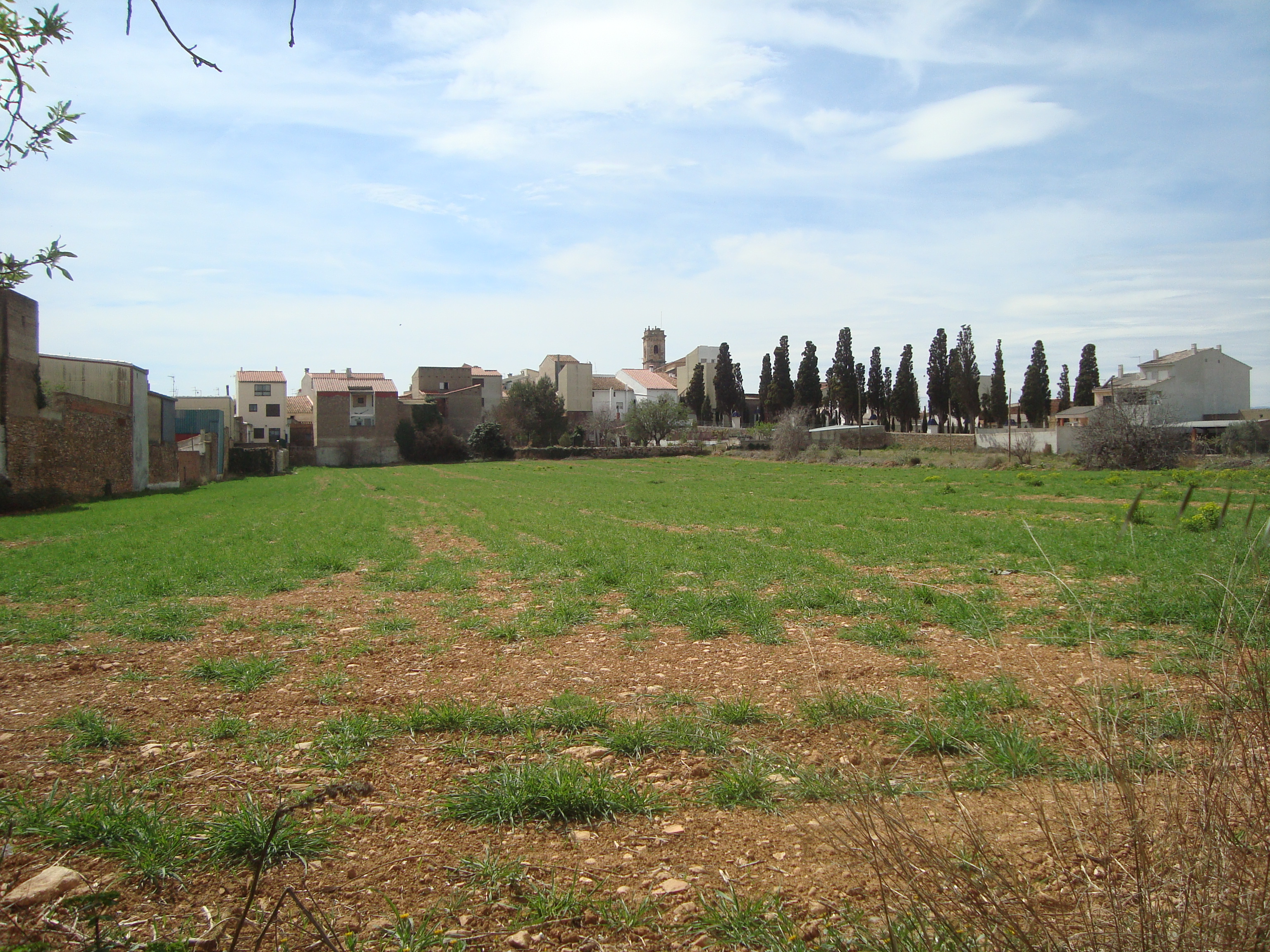
Benlloc, present view

Corbató's ancestors were probably farmers; at some point one of their representatives managed to access lower professional strata. His father, José Corbató Cardá, was related to the Levantine town of Benlloc, where in the mid-19th century he worked as a teacher in local primary school. At unspecified time he married Vicenta Chillida Planell; none of the sources consulted provides any information either on her or her family, except that they were entitled to a petty rural rent. The couple had 5 children, José born third in succession and the first male descendant. The family was very pious; already at the age of 4 José knew how to pray a rosary, some of his cousins became priests, and 3 of the Corbató Chillida siblings became religious themselves.

Following the 1868 revolution Corbató Cardá fervently opposed the new order; he declared himself supporter of the legitimist claimant Carlos VII and refused to take oath to the constitution of 1869. As a result, he was not only fired from his petty teaching job, but reportedly also jailed, detained in Valencia and threatened with execution; during his incarceration the family suffered great economic hardships. Upon Corbató Cardá's release in 1871 he was reinstated to the official job but posted some 60 km away to Zorita, in the Castellón Maestrazgo already bordering Aragón; the entire family settled in the town as well.

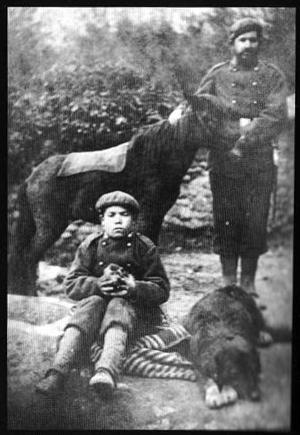
juvenile Carlist combatant of Third Carlist War

Upon outbreak of the Third Carlist War José 4 times escaped from home to enlist to legitimist troops, always rejected due to his age. In 1874 and posing as a 15-year-old he was eventually admitted, assigned to the garrison of Cantavieja. Shortly afterwards he was transferred to units commanded by Pascual Cucala and become POW during the battle of Miravet. For a few months he was shuttled between various prisons. Thanks to exchange of prisoners the boy returned to Carlist ranks, initially commanded by Francisco Savalls and then again by Cucala. He served in various units until Carlist troops in Catalonia surrendered in 1875. Exact role of the boy is not clear and it is not certain whether José took part in combat or performed some auxiliary roles.

In 1876 Corbató entered the Tortosa seminary. Following a brief spell in Dominican seminary in Belchite he then moved to the one in Corias, where he commenced novitiate and assumed the name of José Domingo. In 1880 he took simple vows and formally entered the Dominican Order, assigned to the Nuestra Señora de las Caldas monastery. His conventual years were marked by conflicts with superiors, including altercation with the future Dominican provincial superior, Cayetano García Cienfuego. In 1887 Corbató was moved to San Pablo convent in Palencia, where he was charged with fraud and temporarily suspended. Shuttled between Valdeprado del Río, Palencia and Corias, he was also accused of indecent correspondence. In 1889 Vatican was asked for his interminable suspension. Eventually Corbató retained his ministerial licenses and was allowed to live extraconventual life. In 1890 he moved to Villareal to settle with his parents.

== Carlist propagandist ==
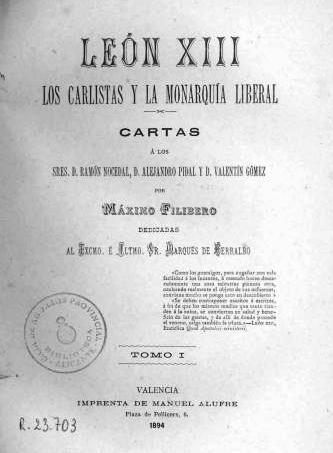
León XIII, los carlistas y la monarquía liberal

Having gained experience as periodista during his conventual years, in the early 1890s Corbató was the moving spirit – in some cases also formally a director – of a few periodicals: a Castellón weekly La Voz de Maestrazgo (1891–1893), a Valencian daily El Valenciano (1893–1894), its continuation El Criterio Valenciano (1894–1895) and a Valencian weekly La Monarquía Federal (1895–1896). All operated at the verge of profitability, sustained mostly by donations; their circulation was at best nearing 3,000. All assumed extremely combative Carlist stand, directed not only against Liberal and Conservative groupings, but also against other Levantine Catholic periodicals; Corbató claimed exclusive license for orthodox Catholicism. None was officially authorized by local Carlist structures, though some posed to represent Traditionalist organizations. While attracting second-rate contributors and in few cases Levantine Carlist pundits, all periodicals remained Corbató's one-man show and for long periods he used to populate their pages almost single-handedly. Moreover, in the mid-1890s Corbató turned into a genuine icon of young Valencian Carlists; at home he ran an informal circulo, built his own following and started to appear as an alternative leader, differing from old-style tycoons like Llorens, Polo and Manuel Simó Marín.

Relatively unknown beyond the Traditionalist Levantine circles, in 1894–95 Corbató was elevated to nationwide celebrity. It was because of his 1894 booklet León XIII, los carlistas y la monarquía liberal. Resembling an earlier pamphlet of Félix Sardà y Salvany, it was a most intransigent interpretation of papal teachings and contained onslaught on liberal and conservative politics; the booklet presented Carlism as the sole depositary of Catholicism and lambasted various breeds of traitors. León triggered legal action as Corbató alleged that the regent, Maria Christina, was heading the Spanish freemasonry. The cause turned into a scandal and was attentively followed by national press; even the prime minister Sagasta admitted to having read the pamphlet. Corbató was expulsed from the Dominican order, the first such case ever recorded in Spain. In 1896 he was sentenced to 11 years in prison and huge financial penalty.

Carlist standard

Evading incarceration, in early 1896 Corbató fled Spain. He was briefly hosted by the claimant in Venice, yet he settled permanently in Paris; he tried to make a living by teaching Latin, translations, editing antologies and providing religious service. Unable to manage Monarquía remotely he decided to close it. In 1896 he published Dios, patria y rey o el catecismo del carlista; the booklet presented Carlos VII as a model Christian king, determined to fight liberal tyranny, and was sold via Carlist channels in 1896–1898. During the Spanish-American War he zealously engaged in various patriotic initiatives and visited the Spanish embassy offering his own design of a torpedo. Intransigent as always, he denounced the Paris 1900 Universal Exposition as triumph of socialism, Judaism and freemasonry; even the Spanish hierarchy was not spared his venom as timid and not sufficiently committed. In 1899 Corbató published Los Consejos del Cardenal Sancha; the booklet was aimed against the primate and affirmed that only Carlism represented the genuine Catholic stand.

== In search of new identity ==
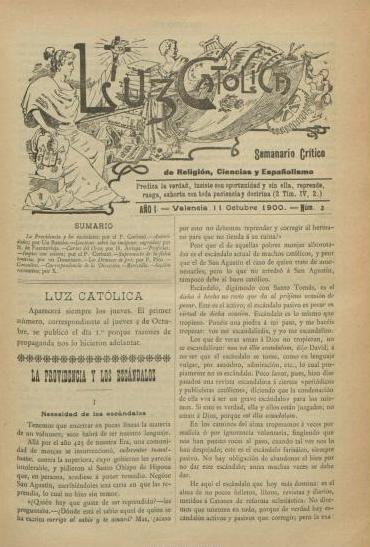
Luz Católica

Though royal amnesty was declared in 1897 and 1898 Corbató was not eligible; he had to wait until 1899, when the usual Fiesta de los Reyes pardon covered also his offences. He returned to Valencia, visited relatives, tried to arrange for a Catholic college, fearing incarceration briefly travelled to Paris and definitely returned in mid-1900; following some confusion his ministerial license was confirmed by the Valencia archbishop. At that time his relations with official Carlism were already strained. Since the mid-1890s he was viewed by local Levantine party leaders as uncontrollable and potentially rebellious. Apart from his political intransigence there were also issues related to personal squabbles and generational divisions involved, and especially Manuel Polo y Peyrolón turned into his vehement critic. Already in Paris Corbató engaged in fervent Carlist insurrectionist propaganda; as in October 1900 the conspiracy boiled down to few isolated attempts he was profoundly disappointed by ambiguous stand of Carlos VII, and his mistrust towards the Levantine party leaders was extended also to the claimant and the national executive.

Back in Spain Corbató – by scholars considered possessed by "obsesiva dedicación al campo de la prensa" – resumed labors to launch a new periodical. He obtained some donations from friends and relatives, was prepared to mortgage his Villareal house and contributed his own meager savings to launch Luz Católica, a weekly which was first published in late 1900. This time the periodical did not assume a clear party identity, sub-titled "Semanario critico de religión, ciencias y españolismo". Initially the weekly might have seemed flavored with Carlism, e.g. when it questioned Traditionalist credentials of Polo y Peyrolón, but soon it turned decisively against the party. Posing as a genuine Traditionalist voice, Luz Católica started to castigate cesarism and hypocrisy of Carlos VII and his men, including the party leader Barrio y Miér; they allegedly opted for rapprochement with the Restoration system. In 1903 Luz Católica was revamped as La Señal de Victoria, but its editorial line remained the same.

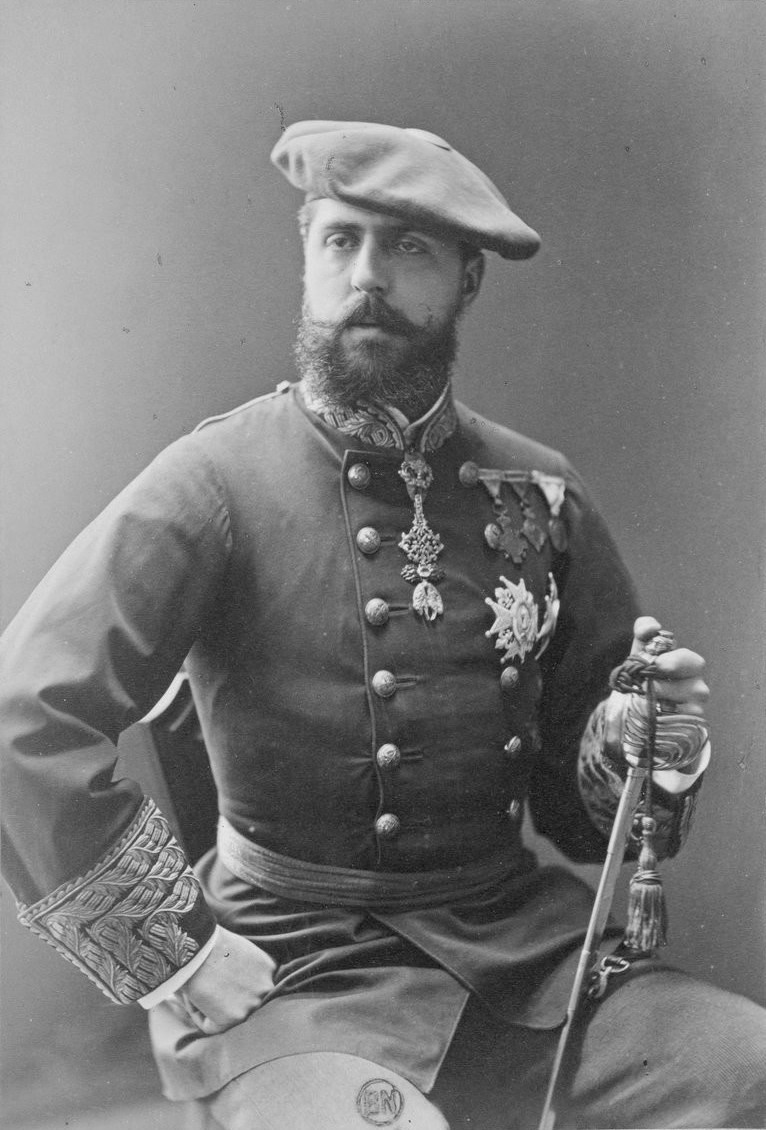
Carlos VII

Corbató's anti-Carlist campaign climaxed with the 1904 publication of Los carlo-traidores. Memoria póstuma del general D. Salvador Soliva. The pamphlet, written jointly with Joan Bardina but published anonymously, was an open and virulent onslaught on the claimant. Dwelling mostly upon the failed 1900 insurrection which allegedly left ardent and dedicated partisans of the cause abandoned by their leaders, the authors presented Carlos VII as traitor to the cause and to the men who trusted him, a delator, fraudster sold out to liberalism and perhaps a man financed with the Alfonsist money. The book triggered a spate of furious attacks on part of the Carlist press; the affair sealed Corbató's break with Carlism. He embraced Traditionalism deprived of the dynastic thread, which he now ridiculed as "Carlos, Carlos y Carlos o César, César y César". At that time Corbató was already promoting a general alliance of all anti-Liberal political groupings. He began to relativize his earlier vehemence, e.g. against the Integrists, and opted for a broad, patriotic and Catholic formula.

== Españolista ==
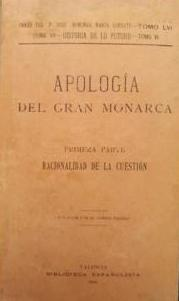
Apología del gran monarca

In the early 1900s Corbató developed his own political theory. Auto-identified as españolismo, it was laid out in some 20 booklets published in Valencia between 1900 and 1905; the best known work is Apología del Gran Monarca. Corbató's españolismo was a highly providentialist, millenarian doctrine which combined exalted patriotism and religious zeal. Based on assumption that the global liberal order would undoubtedly collapse it envisioned ultimate advent of a universalist monarchy. In a regenerationist tone Corbató hinted that the impulse might come from Spain, which would regain imperial status as a Hispanic commonwealth. He remained ambiguous as to the future monarch. Scholars reconstruct his españolismo as "a form of anti-liberal Spanish nationalism, founded on ultramontane Catholicism and Traditionalism, with the objective of building a moderate, regionalist monarchy and corporative society". One historian sees Corbató's españolismo as an attempt to modernize Traditionalism; another presents it rather in terms of mysticism and esoterism.

Apart from his booklets, the principal platform of advancing Corbató's ideas were La Luz Católica and La Señal de Victoria. However, he tried also to set up own political organisation. Since 1902 he headed a Valencia-based Junta Central Católico-Españolista; it presided over few small local círculos. He tried to operate "Academia Españolista" in Barcelona, though with some 40 members it remained almost defunct. His most successful structure was Milicia de la Cruz, founded in 1901. It adhered to a hybrid formula in-between a secular religious order, paramilitary organisation and traditional círculo; its membership is unclear, though it should probably be estimated in tens rather than hundreds. As its leader Corbató assumed a new name, Francisco María Cruz; the militia operated thanks to minor donations and sought support of the local religious hierarchy.

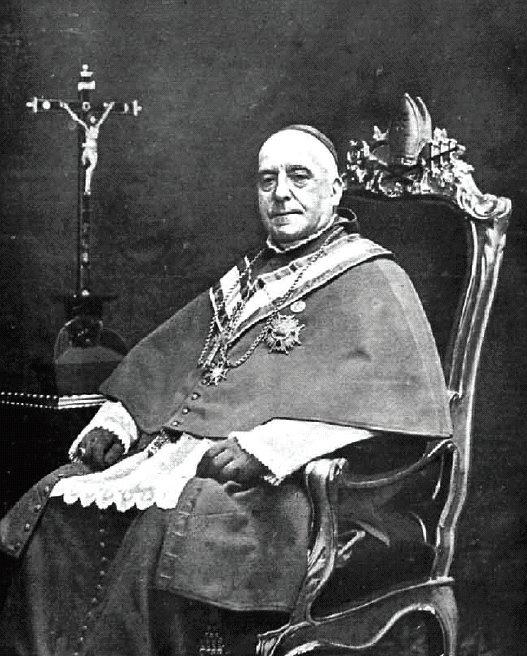
cardenal Guisasola

In 1905 Corbató left Valencia for the Basque Mendívil. Invited by the local entrepreneur Alfredo Ortiz de Villacián he was supposed to serve the community of local miners. In fact, both were consumed by a theory of immaculate conception of Saint Joseph. When in 1907 he published El Inmaculado San José and tried to launch the cult of Sagrado Corazón de San José, the Vítoria bishop prohibited him from saying mass; he was also admonished by Rome. Locally he was increasingly frequently ridiculed as a madman. Subscribers of La Señal started to withdraw and the daily soon collapsed. He dissolved Milicia de la Cruz in 1907 and did not try to rebuild it when returned to Valencia in 1910. Instead, he focused on a new periodical; preparatory works lasted until 1912, when it materialized as a bi-weekly Tradición y Progreso. The local hierarchy viewed him as a "dangerous man"; Victoriano Guisasola y Menéndez suspended his ministerial licenses and denounced his writings as deviating from the orthodox Catholic teaching. Following few issues Tradición closed in late 1912; at the time Corbató was already gravely ill and in poverty. His passing away was barely noticed in the press. Some of his disciples awaited Corbató's resurrection for a few years to come.

== See also ==
- Carlism
- Traditionalism (Spain)
- Españolismo
