= Matías Barrio y Mier =

Spanish politician

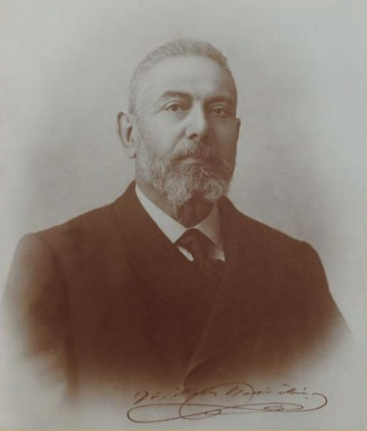
- Born: Matías Barrio y Mier; 1844; Verdeña, Spain
- Died: 1909 (aged 64–65); Madrid, Spain
- Occupation: politician
- Known for: academic, politician
- Political party: Carlism

Matías Barrio y Mier (1844–1909) was a Spanish law academic and a Carlist politician. He served as a scholar of jurisprudence at various universities, though mostly in Oviedo (1881–1892) and Madrid (1892–1909), and authored manuals used by students until the 1930s. He is best known, however, as the Carlist political leader (1899–1909). As a Traditionalist he served 9 terms in the Cortes, initially during the rule of Amadeo I (1871–1872) and then during the Restoration period (1891–1903, 1905–1909).

== Family and youth ==
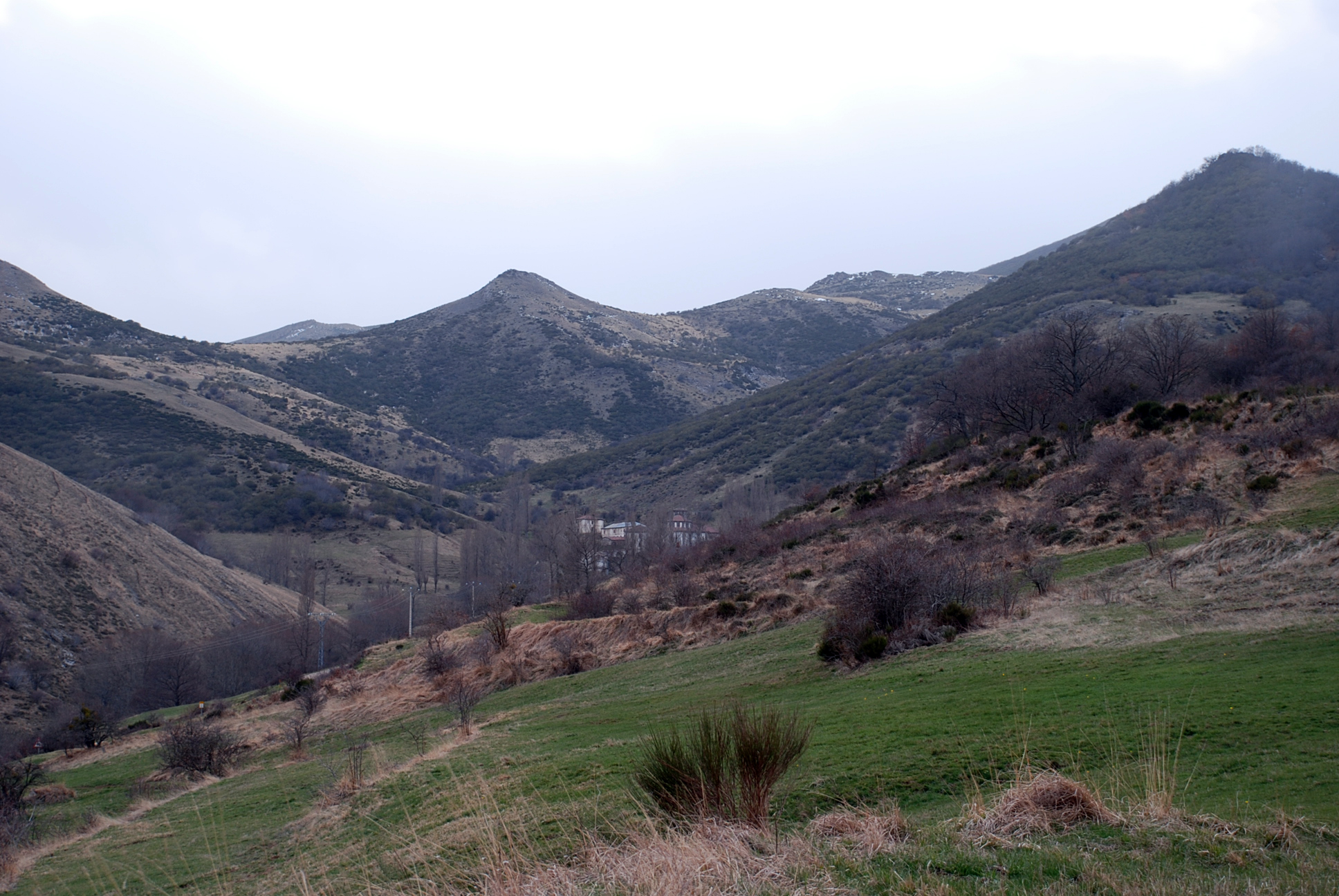
Palentine mountains near Verdeña

Matías Barrio y Mier was born in a mountainous village of Verdeña (Province of Palencia). His paternal grandparents, Manuel Barrio and Teresa Vielba, were local hidalgos. His maternal grandparents, Simon Morante and Tomasa de Mier, belonged to petty nobility from the nearby San Juan de Redondo. His father José Barrio Vielba married Dolores de Mier y Terán; the couple had no children. Following her premature death, in 1836 Barrio Vielba married the niece of his defunct wife, Susana de Mier. The couple had 4 children, Matías coming third and the only son. At the age of 8 he moved to Toledo, where his maternal uncle served at the prestigious post of the Cathedral dean; he looked after Matías when the latter attended Latinidad y Humanidades course at the local Instituto Provincial de Segunda Enseñanza (periodically also private colleges in Madrid), until the young Barrio became Bachelor of Arts in 1859 (cum laude). As a teenager Matías intended to join the military, but dissuaded by his father, he eventually agreed to pursue a career in law.

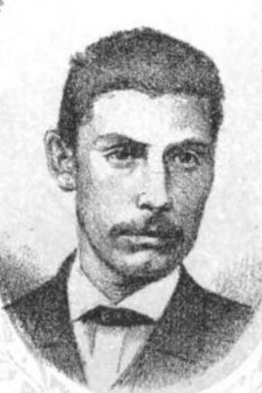
Barrio as a young catedrático, around 1870

In 1859 Barrio moved to Valladolid, where he studied Filosofia y Letras and Derecho Administrativo simultaneously. He completed the law studies first, obtaining bachillerato in 1863 and graduating (cum laude) the year after. In 1865 he started doctoral research in Derecho Civil y Canónico at Central in Madrid; his PhD title was awarded in 1866. He pursued his Philosophy and Letters studies to obtain bachillerato (from Valladolid) 1867, graduating (from Central) in 1868 and reaching for PhD laurels in 1872, still at Central. He followed a number of other classes, getting certified as archivist and librarian from Escuela Especial de Diplomática; he also studied theology in Madrid and Vitoria, though sources differ as to the grade he reached. Barrio completed also some courses abroad; at the Paris École des Hautes Études he studied sanscrit, perfected in Madrid in the late 1870s. When the Spanish revolution of 1868 broke out Barrio was already a formidable prospective scholar, with one PhD, four licenciaturas and six carreras completed.

In 1871 Matías Barrio married an Asturiana from Llanes, Maximina Marcos Sánchez. Nothing is known about her or her family, except that it was "one of the most distinguished ones" in the city and that she outlived her husband at least by 14 years. The couple had 4 children, José, Carlos, Jaime and Blanca; the family moved across Spain, following the professional lot of Barrio and his subsequent academic assignments. The oldest son, José Barrio Marcos, died as a student in 1900, Blanca perished at 26 years of age in 1910. Carlos grew to head of fiscal administration in Valladolid in the mid-1930s; he was dismissed by the Francoist administration in late 1936; the dismissal was related to the decree which envisioned release from state service officials who demonstrated antipatriotic behavior. There is nothing known about one more son, Jaime; there is neither any information available on any of Barrio's grandchildren.

== Academic ==
Matías Barrio commenced his teaching career as an interim assistant professor in Valladolid in 1864–65, the following year nominated assistant professor in Comparative Law at Facultad de Derecho at Central in Madrid. As in 1869 he completed the required 25 years of age, following an unsuccessful bid for the chair of Derecho Romano at Central, he applied and won the chair of Derecho Político y Administrativo español and Derecho Político de los principales Estados at Universidad Literaria in Vitoria, a local Álavese institution managed by its self-government. In 1873 the local ayuntamiento fired Barrio for his refusal to join Batallón de Voluntarios de la República; one year later, in full swing of the Third Carlist War, the governmental order released him from the chair of Geografia Historica at Universidad de Zaragoza.

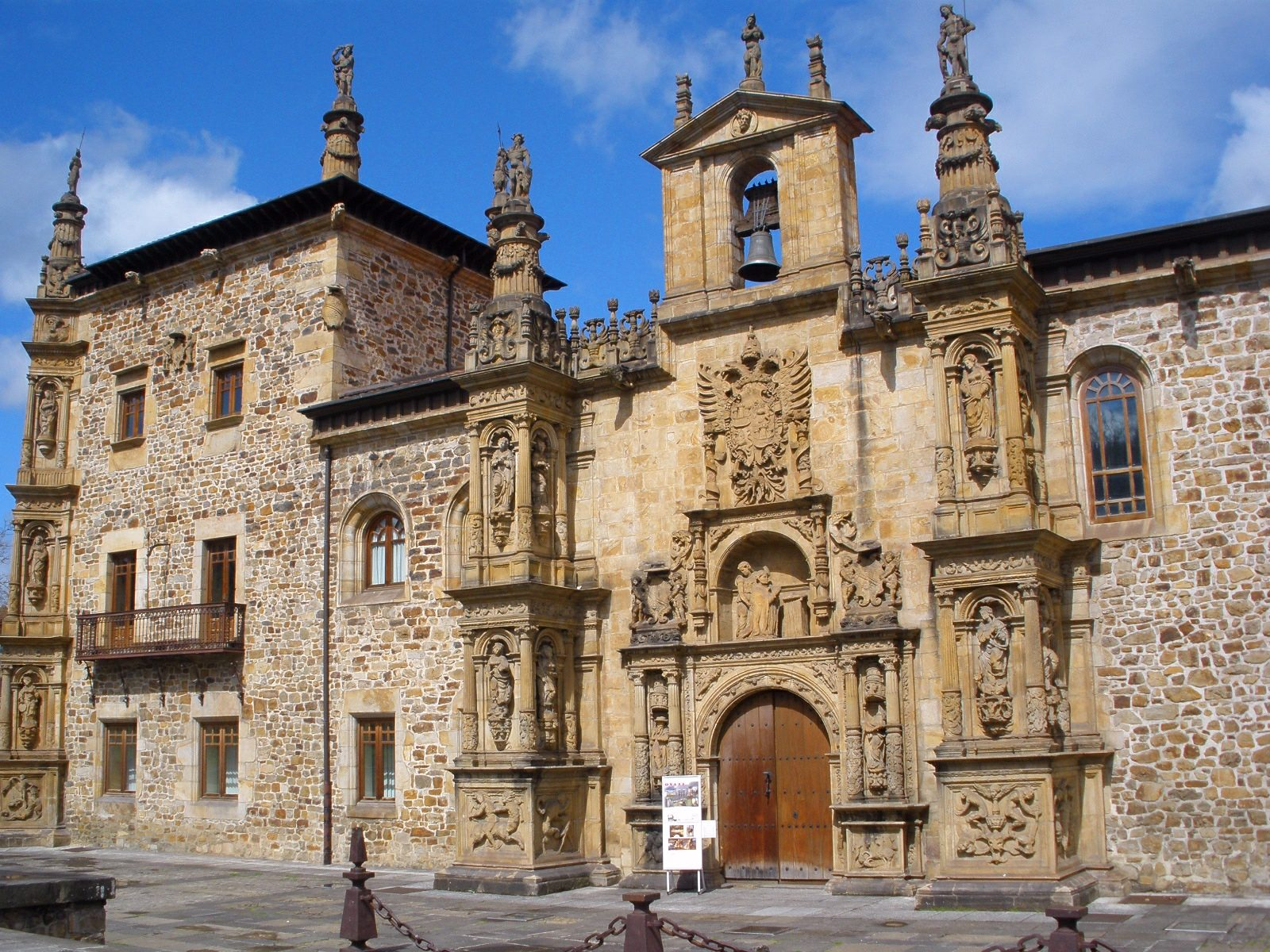
former University of Oñate

Expulsed to France he returned to Spain to the Carlist-held territory, where at the university of Oñate he became dean of the Jurisprudence Faculty, working also as catedratico and a librarian. Following the Carlist defeat he migrated to France but returned thanks to the 1877 amnesty, unsuccessfully requesting re-installment at his Zaragoza post. In 1880 he was nominated (beating 9 counter-candidates) catedratico numerario at Universidad de Valencia and commenced teaching Prolegómenos de Derecho e Historia and Elementos de Derecho Romano. Following a brief spell in Zaragoza (teaching Historia Universal) he had his rights fully reinstated and acknowledged by the ministry in 1881.

In 1881 Barrio commenced his 11-year-spell at Universidad de Oviedo, where he initially assumed Historia y elementos de Derecho civil español, in 1883 elected dean of the Faculty of Law and 1884 starting lectures in Derecho civil español, común y foral. He is remembered for having reformed the library of the Law Faculty, granting access to the public. In 1892 Barrio left Asturias for Madrid, as he won the competition to chair Derecho civil español, común y foral at Universidad Central; in 1902 he assumed Derecho común de España comparado con el foral there. Elected unanimously dean of the Faculty of Law in 1905.

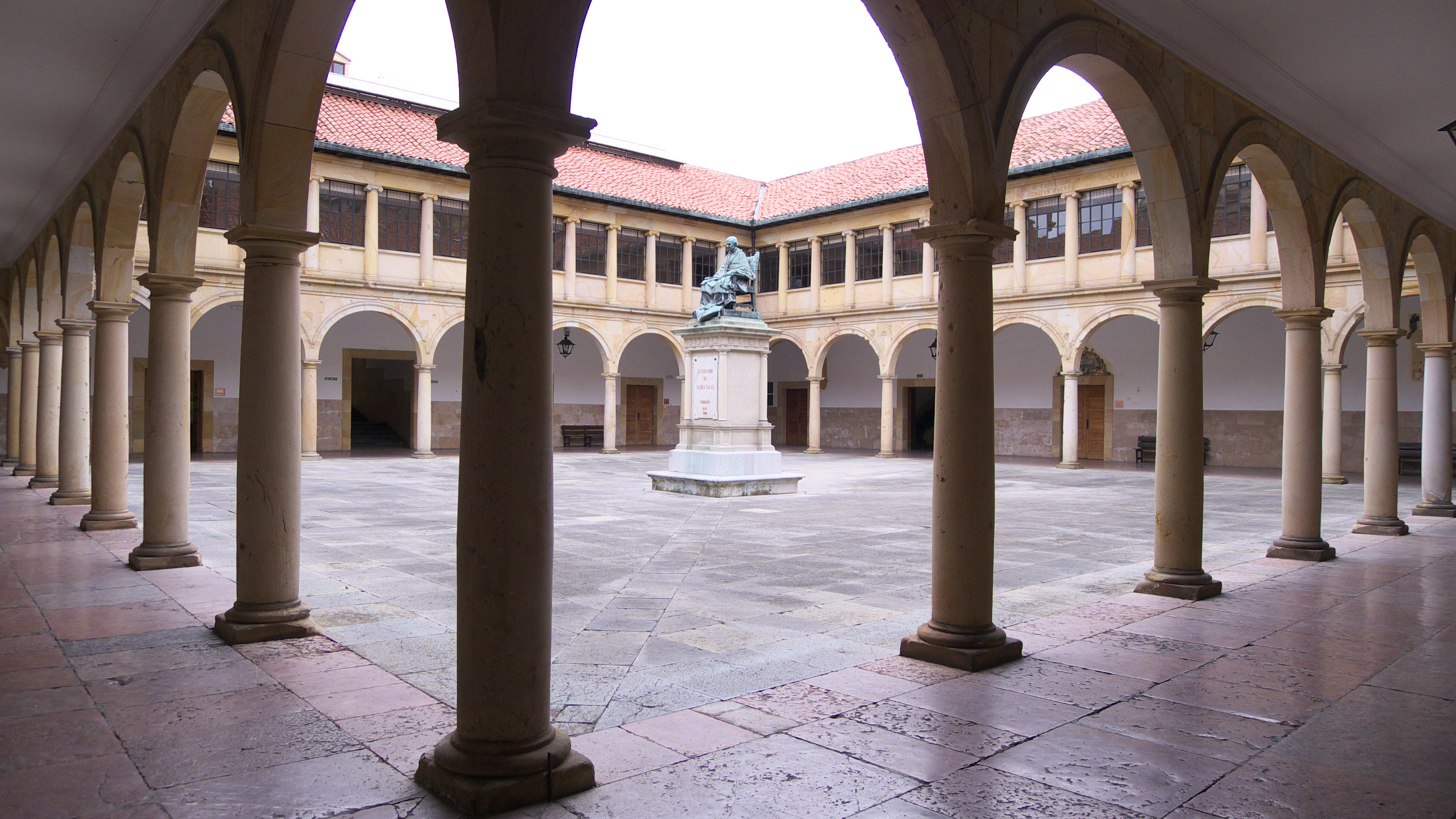
University of Oviedo

His fundamental work is the monumental Historia general del derecho español, which served as a textbook for generations of students of law in Spain and in Latin America, re-issued with some modifications even 30 years later, see Apuntes de historia general del derecho español, issued by Universidad Central in 1929. In Palencia he is recorded as an author of a small booklet named Tradiciones pernianas, published in 1871; a late version of earlier Romantic books on folk culture, it described Palencian customs and gathered together local tales. Another work, never published and left as manuscript, is Territorio Perniano, dated 1878 and gathering data on localities in the regions of Liebana and La Pernía.

== Public servant ==
During his university years of early 1860s Barrio was active in the Ateneo of Valladolid, later animating also the local Juventud Catolica. Initially holding petty positions in the local fiscal structures he declined a career offer and dedicated himself to law. In 1869 he entered Colegio de Abogados in Madrid, followed by joining similar bodies in Vitoria (1869) and in Valladolid (1878). He practiced as an attorney for the poor in Madrid, opening law offices in Palencia and Cervera de Pisuerga. As a lawyer and academic he gained great prestige for competence and impartiality, and was often nominated as referee in many oposiciones de cátedras across the country. He is noted for his stance during the competition for Cátedra de Lógica, Etica y Derecho at Instituto de Enseñanza Media in Toledo; facing a choice between two contenders, a Traditionalist Catholic priest and the future socialist leader Julián Besteiro, Barrio voted for the latter.

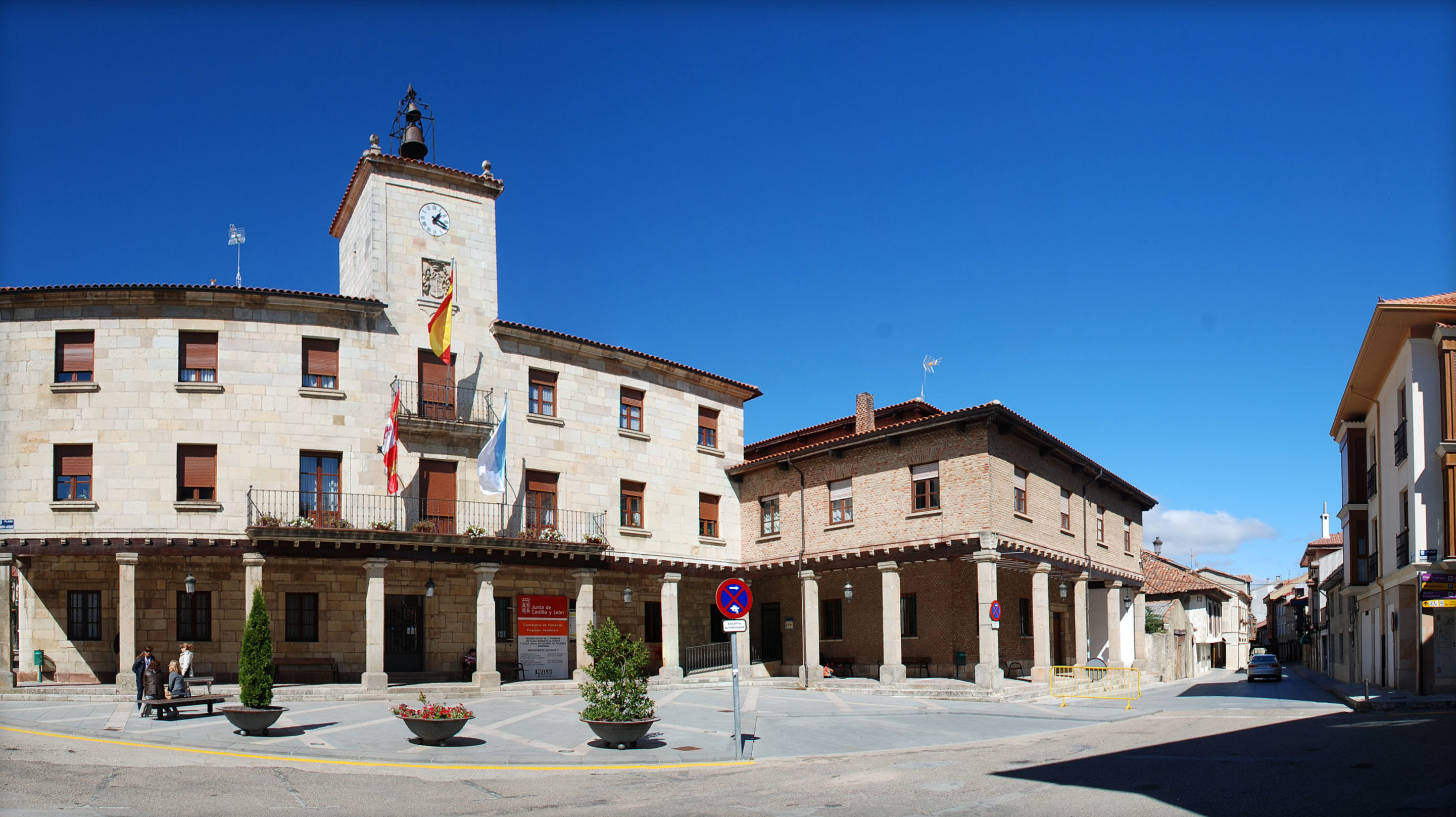
Cervera de Pisuerga

Some sources claim that he unsuccessfully ran for the Cortes in 1869 from Cervera. Most studies start by noting that he commenced his parliamentary career elected from Cervera as a Carlist candidate in 1871, though the mandate did not last long. Following 20 years dedicated to academic career, in 1891 Barrio resumed his parliamentarian duties as a deputy of his native Cervera de Pisuerga. From this moment onwards he was elected almost continuously 8 times from 1891 to 1907, the only exception having been 1903, when he lost to a local conservative candidate.

As a deputy he is recorded for calm logic rather than hyperbolic rhetoric; he is not noted as an impressive speaker, though remembered as a respectful, non-aggressive and conciliatory MP, even towards the Republican deputies. During 15 years of service his interventions ranged from local Palentine issues (road construction and maintenance, subsidies to local institutions, relief for victims of natural disasters, pension rights, railway lines, also defense of peasants accused of rural property crimes) to national and international matters. As an expert in law, he chaired the Comisión de Codificación and was counselor to Ministry of Education. As a Carlist deputy he spoke in defense of the Church and is noted for condoning atrocities committed by the Catholic missionaries in the Spanish Guinea Equatorial. In June 1898 as leader of Carlist minority he abstained from giving advice when the prime minister Sagasta consulted the parties on continuation or termination of the war with the United States, though 3 months later he voiced against accepting the Washington Protocol and along few deputies signed a manifesto to the nation, denouncing the treaty.

== Carlist ==
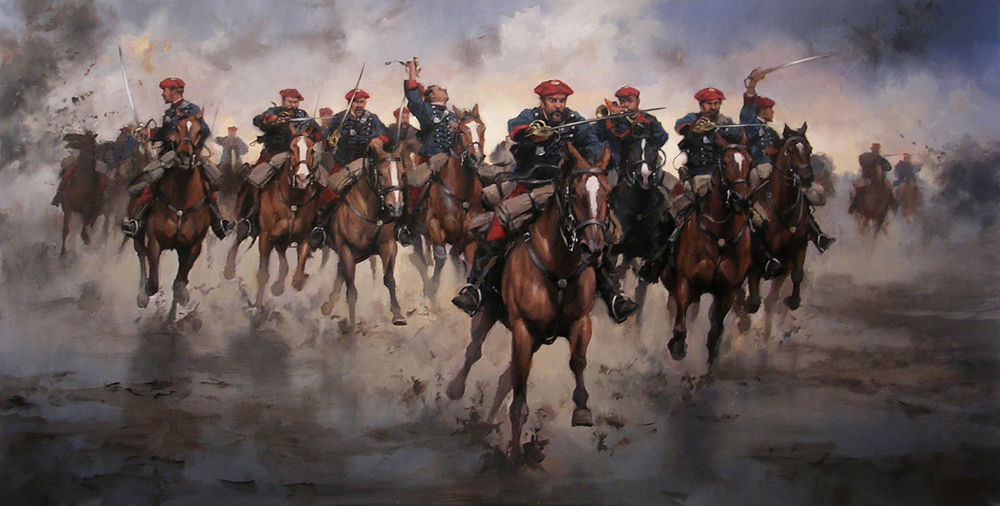
Carlist cavalry charging

It was his parents, both fundamentally Carlist, who passed their intransigent Traditionalist outlook to Matías Barrio. In 1867-1869 he was an editor and contributor to the local Carlist periodical La Cruzada. It is possible that due to his political stance he faced some harassment as a fiscal official and as a candidate to the Cortes; it is confirmed that politics cost him academic positions in Vitoria and especially in Zaragoza in 1874 during the Third Carlist War, when he was detained and expulsed from the country. He joined the insurgency soon afterwards, though it is not clear whether he served with the combat troops before nomination to Corregidor del señorio de Vizcaya by Carlos VII. At this role, together with his position at the Orduña university, Barrio became the heart and soul of the judicial and cultural organisation in the insurgent Carlist state, though the actual Minister of Justice was Romualdo de Viñaret.

Carlist standard

Little is known about Barrio's Carlist activity in the 1880s, though he was probably busy rebuilding the Traditionalist network in León. His position in the organization grew once he became a deputy and started speaking in defense of the Carlist cause in the Cortes. With the number of Carlist deputies ranging from 5 to 10, Barrio, along Cesáreo Sanz Escartín, gradually became the most experienced MP and in the late 1890s assumed the post of the Carlist Cortes minority speaker (though the parliamentarian leadership was reserved for the senator, marqués de Cerralbo); by the same time he emerged as the regional Leonese leader and the representative of León in the nationwide structures. He also became one of the movement's pundits, regularly publishing in the semi-official Carlist daily, El Correo Español. In case the Jefe Delegado, marqués de Cerralbo, was out of the country, it was usually Matías Barrio replacing him.

== Jefe Delegado ==
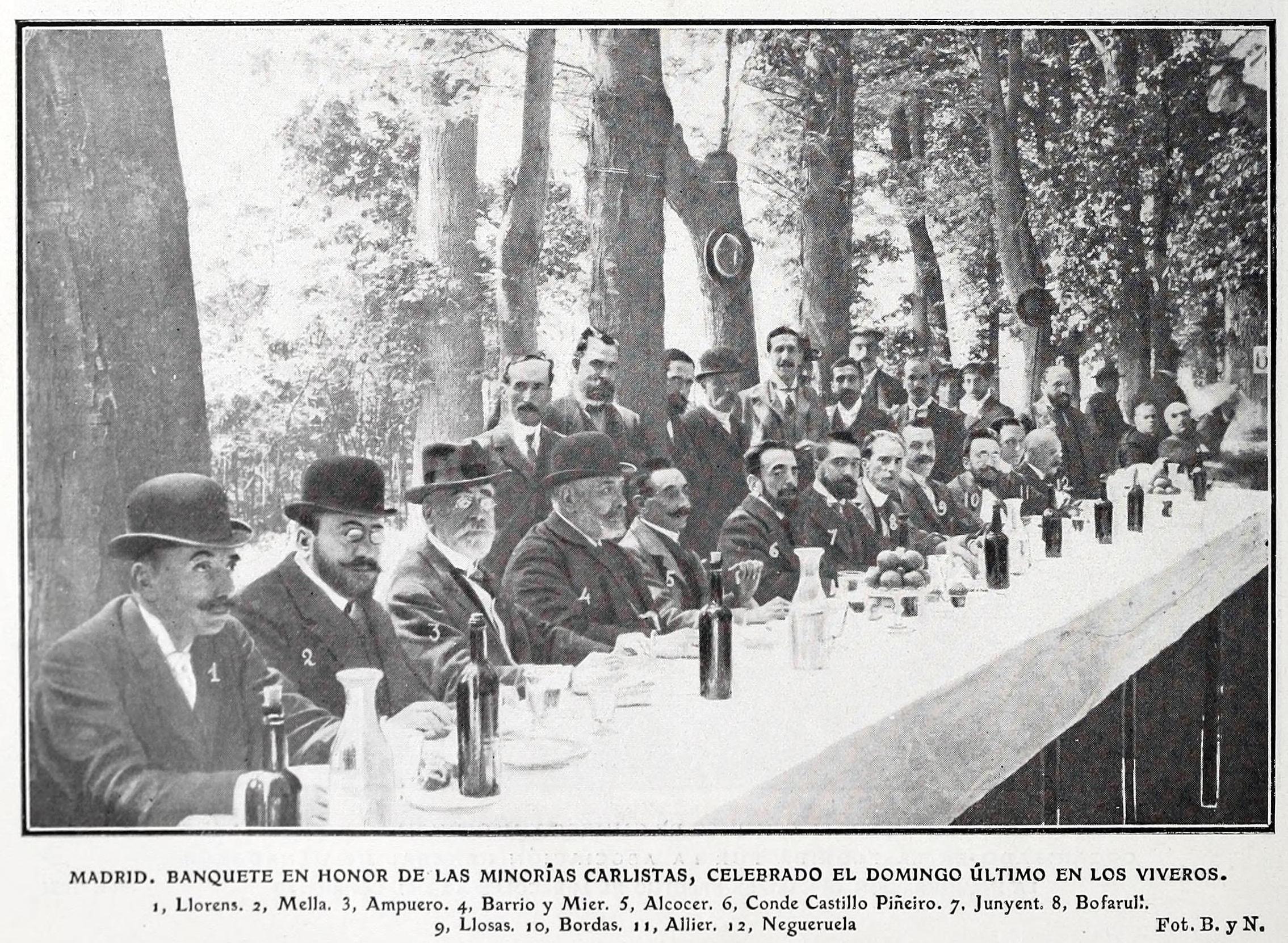
Barrio at a Carlist banquete, 1907

When de Cerralbo resigned as Jefe Delegado in 1899 there were many personalities counting as his potential successors, including Juan Vázquez de Mella, Tirso de Olazábal, conde de Melgar, Romualdo Cesáreo Sanz Escartin, marqués de Valde-Espina, Joaquín Lloréns or Manuel Polo y Peyrolón. Despite Olazábal having been rumored to get the post, Carlos VII opted for Matías Barrio. As at that time the conservative and liberal press was widely speculating about another Carlist war approaching, the appointment of a “notorious legalist” and “conciliator” Barrio might have been interpreted as calming the waters, though actual intentions of the claimant remain rather unclear.

Barrio did not manage to prevent isolated and probably spontaneous outbursts of Carlist insurgency, especially the 1900 Badalona uprising dubbed "La Octubrada". As unlike many Carlist personalities Barrio was spared the resulting governmental repressive action, his primary task turned out to be reconstruction of the party, suffering from closures of circulos, suspension of periodicals and exile of its leaders. The reopening of circulos produced their visible reformatting, with increased female presence and more focus on youth, including sport (especially football). The resumption of press activities produced a conflict with de Mella, already averse towards Barrio, as the claimant ordered his Jefe Delegado to purge El Correo Español of the Mellista influence.

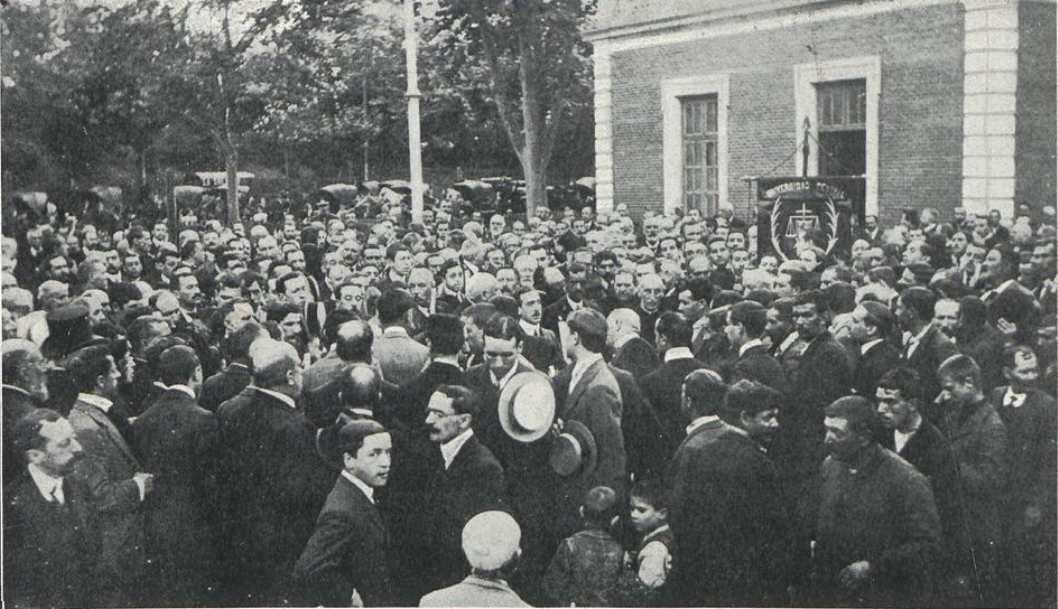
Barrio's funeral

In the early 20th century Matías Barrio was already suffering from leukemia, which was gradually taking its toll. In 1903 the claimant intended to relieve him of some duties by forming Junta Central with Barrio as president, but the body seemed inept and was dissolved after half a year. During the last years of his activity Barrio kept focusing on building a strong parliamentary minority. Except Navarre, where thanks to Barrio's conciliatory strategy towards Integristas the Traditionalists gained almost a monopoly in political representation, in other regions of Spain these efforts remained rather fruitless. Ready to take the blame Barrio submitted his resignation, which was rejected by Carlos VII. His endeavours were finally crowned two years before death, in the 1907 elections, as the Traditionalists, mostly thanks to joining Solidaritat Catalana, recorded their largest electoral success so far and gained 16 mandates in the Cortes, the result bettered only once, 26 years later.

== See also ==
- Carlism
- Restoration (Spain)
- Electoral Carlism (Restoration)
- Carlos VII
