= Cesáreo Sanz Escartín =

Spanish Carlist politician and military leader

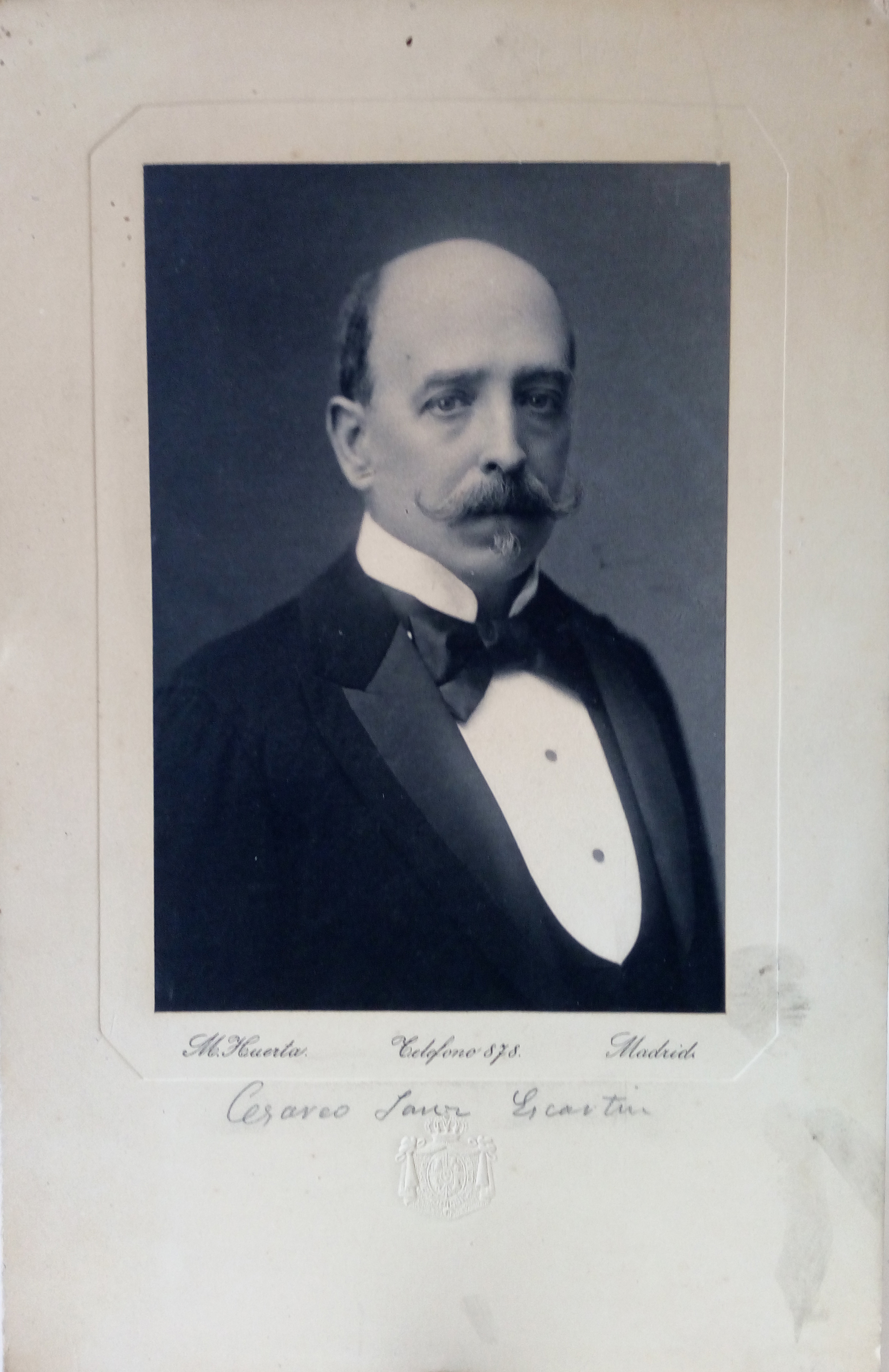
- Born: Cesáreo Sanz Escartín; 1844; Pamplona, Spain
- Died: 1923; Madrid, Spain
- Occupation: entrepreneur
- Known for: politician
- Political party: Carlism

Romualdo Cesáreo Sanz Escartín (1844-1923) was a Spanish Carlist politician and military leader. He is known mostly as a longtime Cortes member, first as a deputy and later as a senator, in both cases representing Navarre. In 1918-1919 he briefly served as provisional leader of Carlist political structures in Spain.

== Family and youth ==
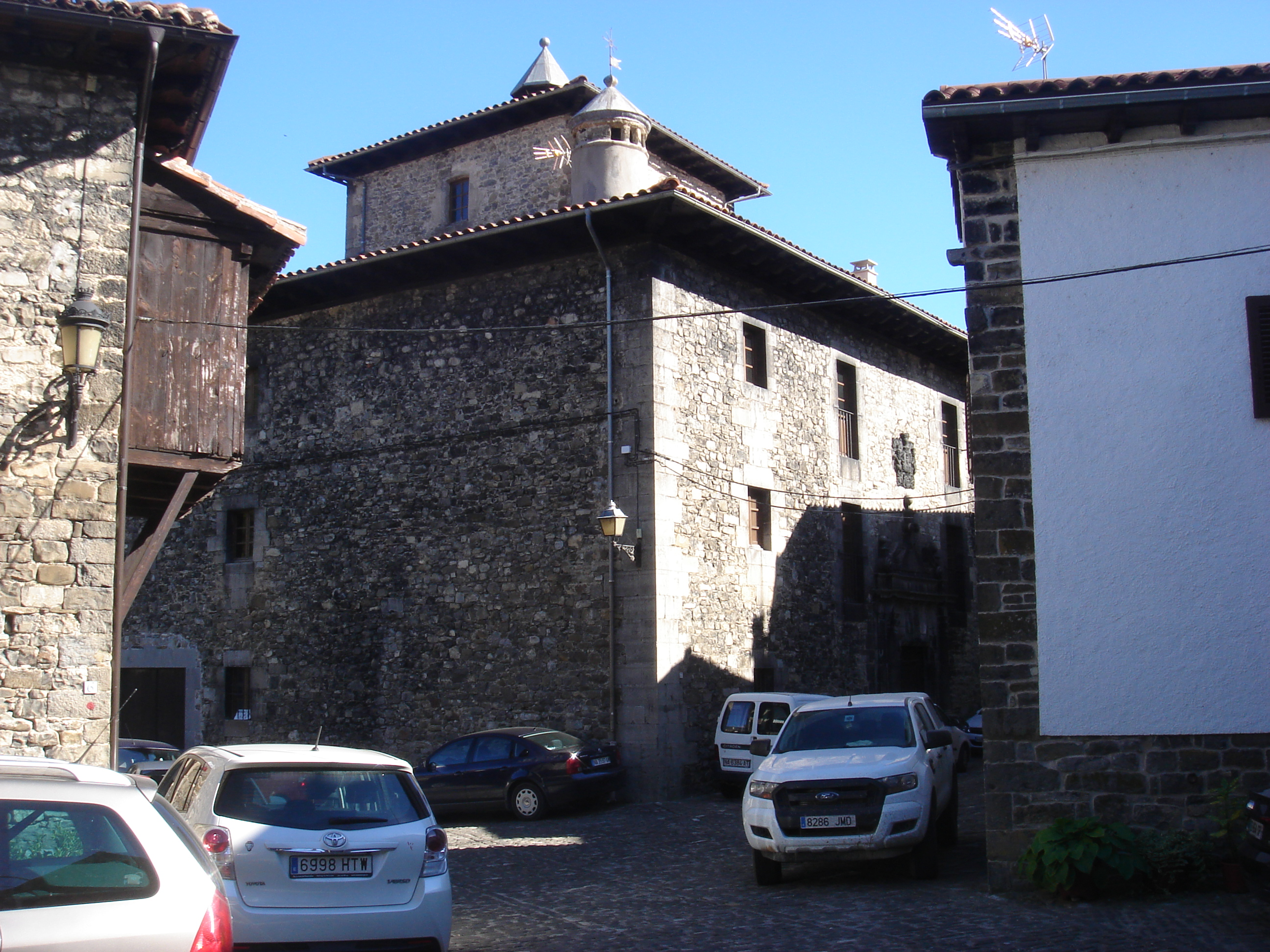
Casa Sanz, Roncal

Along his paternal line Romualdo Cesáreo Sanz Escartín was descendant to Sanz and Amigot families; both for centuries have been related to Valle de Roncal, a mountainous area in the Navarrese Pyrenees, and have inter-married a number of times across a few generations since the 17th century. His paternal grandfather, Agustín Mariano Sanz López (1765-1838), originated from Roncal, where the family owned an iconic Sanz mansion. He married Juana Antonia Amigot Ochoa (1776-1837), also a Roncalesa. Their son and Cesáreo's father, Juan Nepomuceno, served as captain of Carabineros and another relative, Cesáreo Sanz López, in the army. Also other family members served in the uniformed forces: Juan's brother Miguel Sanz Amigot in the Guardia Civil, and rose to the rank of a coronel; he formed part of command layer of Decimotercero Tercio, a unit covering the provinces of Vizcaya, Gipuzkoa, Álava and Navarre.

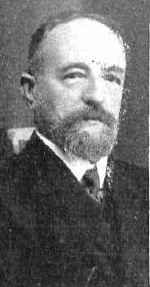
Eduardo Sanz Escartín

Unlike his ascendants Juan Nepomuceno Sanz Amigot did not marry a local a girl and wed Josefa Escartín Mainer (in some sources named as Mayner), a native of Jaca, descendant to an Aragonese family of petty landholders and civil servants noted already in 15th century. The couple settled in Pamplona. It is not clear how many children they had, though there were at least three sons among them. Growing in the family of military tradition, the young Cesáreo was from the onset prepared to join the army; in 1857 he became a cadet in Colegio de Infanteria in Toledo, where in 1861 he completed the standard curriculum and was promoted to the first officer rank of alférez. As excellent student he was not assigned to any field unit and assumed auxiliary teaching duties in the Toledo academy, where in 1863 he became professor de cadetes.

At unspecified time Sanz Escartín married Cristeta Amóros; none of the sources consulted provides any information on his wife, except that she died in 1920. The couple lived mostly in Toledo, though they owned also an apartment at calle San Bernardo in Madrid. It is not clear whether they had any children. Though no author explicitly claims there were none, no genealogical website features any descendants and obituaries of both Sanz and his wife did not mention any; moreover, in last will he administered that personal fortune left after his death be spent on religious purposes. Two of his close relatives became nationally recognized figures. A younger cousin of Cesáreo, Eduardo Sanz Escartín, was a Conservative politician; during late Restoration he grew to civil governor of Barcelona and minister of labor, though he is known mostly as one of sociology pioneers in Spain. Fermín Sanz-Orrio, a son of Romualdo's paternal cousin, was a Falangist politician and minister of labor during mid-Francoism.

== Revolution and war ==
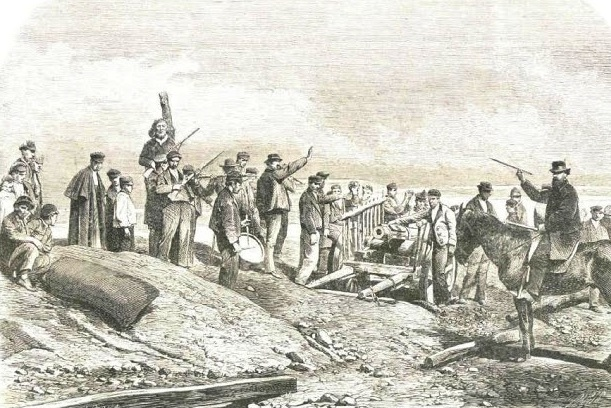
Béjar revolution, 1868

In the mid-1860s Sanz was assigned to batallón de Cazadores de Llerena; he served as teniente when in 1868 the unit was deployed against the revolutionaries in Béjar. The bloodbath and ensuing repression echoed across the country, which prompted Sanz and other officers to defend themselves in the press. Promoted to captain, he resumed teaching duties in Toledo. Sanz's career in the infantry college came to an abrupt end following declaration of the Republic; he lodged a discharge request and was released from the army. At that time he already declared himself a Carlist; straight from Toledo he headed North, where legitimist turmoil was gradually turning into a full-blown civil war. At that time his uncle, Cesáreo Sanz López, was already member of the highest Carlist military and administrative bodies.

Upon access Sanz declined an offer to be promoted to a comandante; he was assigned to the troops commanded by general Nicolas Ollo and operating in central Navarre. It is not clear what unit he was heading during the 1873 campaign, first taking part in victorious battles of Allo and Dicastillo, then taking Estella and finally laying siege to Viana and Lumbier. Gaining his comandante stripes on the battlefield, later in the year he was entrusted with organization of 9. Batallón de Navarra, the unit he then led in combat. In June 1874 he organized a daring attempt to capture Lumbier, an episode which almost cost him life when cut off from his troops, in an isolated house and with personal staff only he fought off enemy soldiers. In the second half of 1874 Sanz led the 9. Battalion at Rocafuerte, Abárzuza and Sangüesa, recognized for both serenity and valor when under fire. During fighting at Santa Margarita heights he personally led a company in a head-on charge and had his horse shot; he was afterwards promoted to teniente coronel.

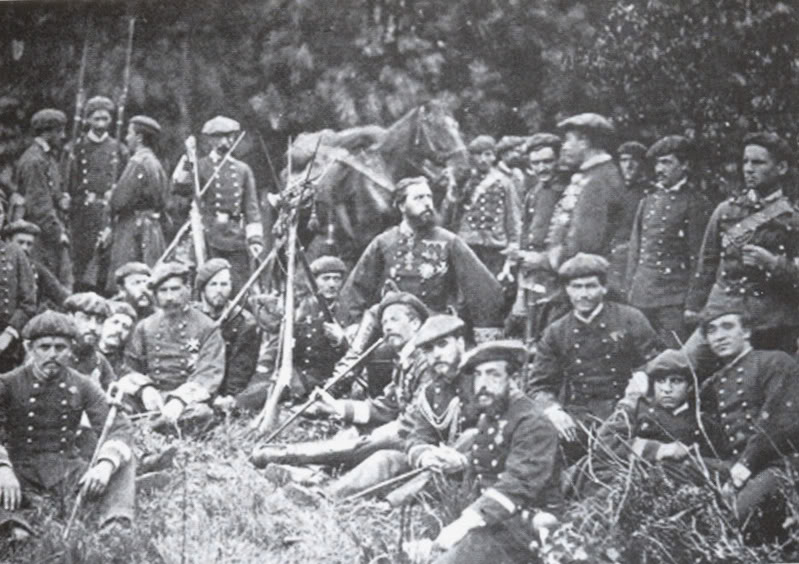
Carlos VII and his staff, 1873-4

In late 1874 Sanz took command of a column, a formation composed of his original 9. Batallón though also of 2. and 4. Navarrese battalions; the grouping was engaged on the Aragon front and until early 1875 took part in the unsuccessful siege of Pamplona. Following the battle of Artazu promoted to coronel de infanteria he left the line command and was appointed head of staff of División de Navarra, commanded by general José Lerga; he is credited for drafting plans to take Lumbier, executed in October 1875 by general José Pérula. At that time Sanz was already responsible for organizing Cuerpo de Inválidos and Batallones Sedentarios, makeshift stopgap formations set up as the Carlist war machine was already running out of steam. Once conde de Caserta assumed command of Ejercito Real del Norte Sanz moved to another staff assignment appointed segundo jefe of his Estado Mayor; at that time the Carlist troops were already in full retreat. Withdrawing towards the Pyrenees, in February 1876 Sanz crossed the French frontier; at that time he was already general de brigada.

== Settled ==
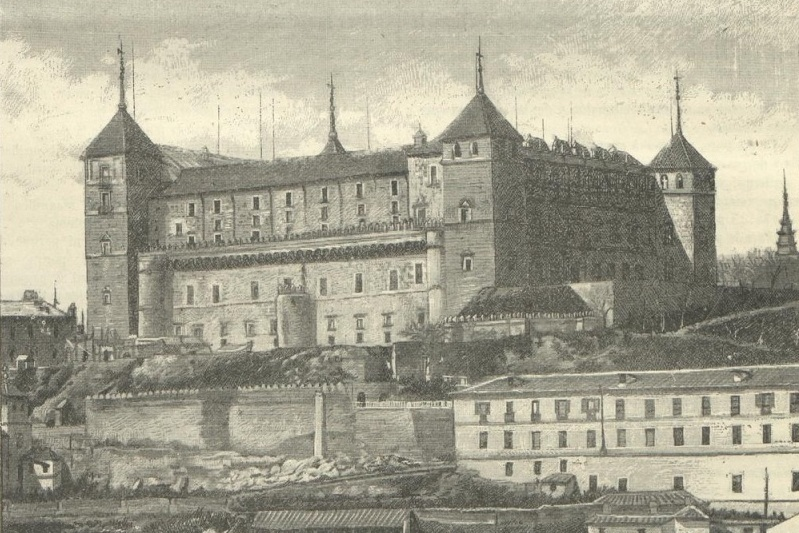
Academia de Infantería, 1880s

Sanz's exile did not last long. At unspecified time though prior to the summer of 1877 he returned to Spain, settling back in Toledo. As a discharged officer he was not entitled to military pension; he decided to make a living banking on his teaching and wartime experience as an infantry commander.

The Toledo Colegio Militár de Infantería, set up by Ministry of Defense in 1850 as the key military education establishment, following a brief period in Madrid returned to Toledo in 1876, renamed as Academia. Located in iconic Alcázar premises and admitting hundreds of officer hopefuls every year it became not only a city landmark, but also exercised enormous influence on local life, with massive impact in terms of lodging, transportation, services and production, all geared to address the academy needs. The Infantry Academy gave rise also to private schools, supposed to prepare candidates to pass the Academia entry exams; during last decades of the 19th century there were 5-8 such establishments operating. It was one of such schools that Sanz Escartín opened himself.

Named Academia Preparatoria, Colegio de Preparación, Colegio General Militar or simply Academia-Colegio, the school was first located at Puerta Llana, then moving to two adjacent buildings at Bajada del Pozo Amargo. Its exact opening year is unclear; some of its later notes claimed it had operated since 1875, though first press adverts targeting new candidates can be traced back to 1877. Invariably featuring Sanz as the director, the school kept recruiting at least until the early 20th century. It is not clear whether lack of press adverts in mid-1890s is indicative of the school temporarily closing or quite to the contrary, acquiring a prestigious status which did not require commercial marketing. Though press adverts did not exploit the Carlist wartime record of its director, parents of similar political leaning used to favor Sanz's college over similar schools; that was the case of Ignacio Hidalgo de Cisneros, the future commander of Republican Air Force, who as a boy was sent from his native Vitoria to Toledo.

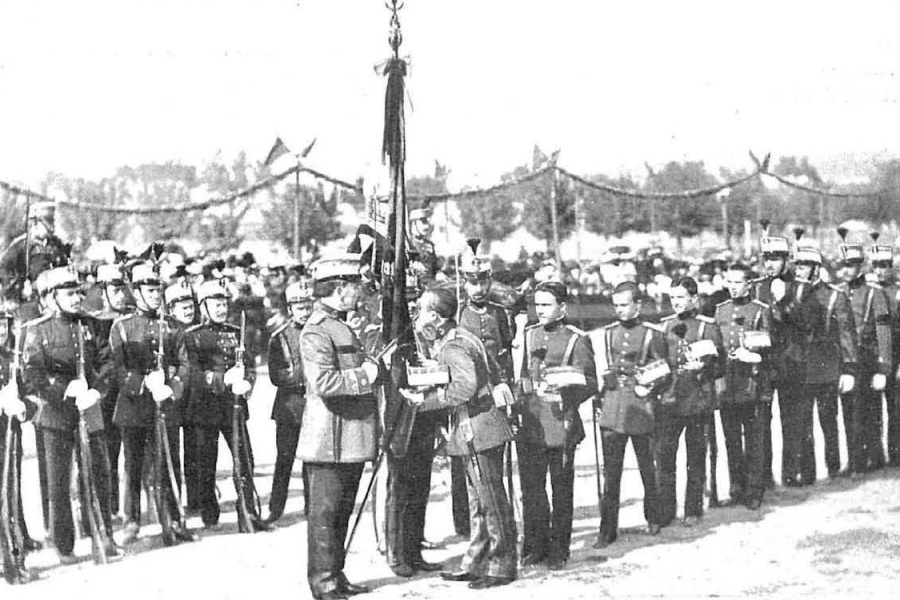
new Toledo cadets taking oath

Sanz's educational establishment seems to have worked well; in 1905 it claimed that 267 of its alumni had passed the Infantry Academy entry exams so far, some of them admitted as "numero uno" in their respective classes. Also independent contemporary commentators noted that in terms of military education Sanz was "greatly successful". At least periodically the college employed some teaching staff, though it is not clear whether Sanz remained an owner-manager or whether he taught himself; the latter is not unlikely, as some sources refer to him as "gran matemático". With some 30 years of teaching record, in the early 20th century the college gained a firm status and its owner emerged as one of established city figures. In the 1910s Sanz entered the Toledan Asociación de Misiones Pedagógicas and became a member of its Junta Directiva. It is not clear in what circumstances and when exactly the college closed. Its last commercial note identified comes from 1911.

== Deputy ==
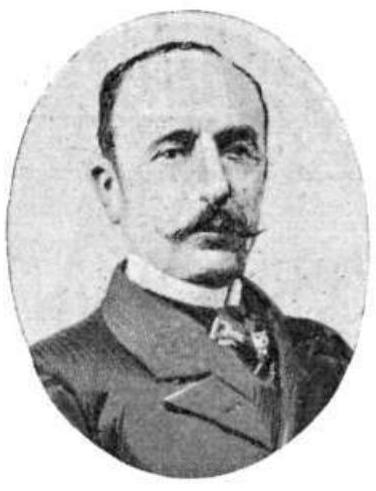
Cerralbo

Following military defeat of 1876 Carlism underwent the period of crisis and did not assume an organized political shape until the late 1880s. Sanz remained on the sidelines of the movement's meager public initiatives; neither in contemporary press nor in scholarly historical works he is noted among provincial, regional or national party leaders. However, he remained engaged in the party, subscribing to Traditionalist press and taking part in mobilization projects formatted as cultural initiatives, e.g. in the mid-1880s donating money to the monument of Tomás Zumalacarregui. During the 1888 crisis, when Ramón Nocedal challenged the claimant and eventually led the secession of the so-called Integrists, Sanz remained loyal to his king. When the new party leader marqués de Cerralbo changed the strategy from abstention to active participation in national political life, Sanz emerged among candidates to take part in electoral race.

During the 1891 campaign the Carlists for the first time decided to field official party lists. Sanz Escartín, though resident of Toledo, was agreed to stand in his native Navarre, in the district of Pamplona. Some newspapers confused him with his uncle, Cesáreo Sanz López, which did not prevent electoral success: Sanz emerged as the front-runner, defeating Conservative, Liberal, Republican and Integrist counter-candidates; especially his victory over the latter must have satisfied the claimant. He was the only one of 4 Carlists running in Navarre who succeeded and one of 7 Carlists elected nationwide. The 1891 success turned out the first in a forthcoming string of almost continuous electoral triumphs: running from the same Pamplona district Sanz got his ticket renewed in 1893, 1896, 1898 and 1901. His victories were always clear, as he used to gain some 40% of the votes cast; usually confident of triumph Sanz scarcely travelled during his campaigns. His stronghold remained central Navarre, with worse results in Pirineos and Cantabricos. The 1891-1903 string would have been uninterrupted save for the 1899 campaign, when the Carlists decided not to take part in elections: Sanz remained fully loyal and complied.

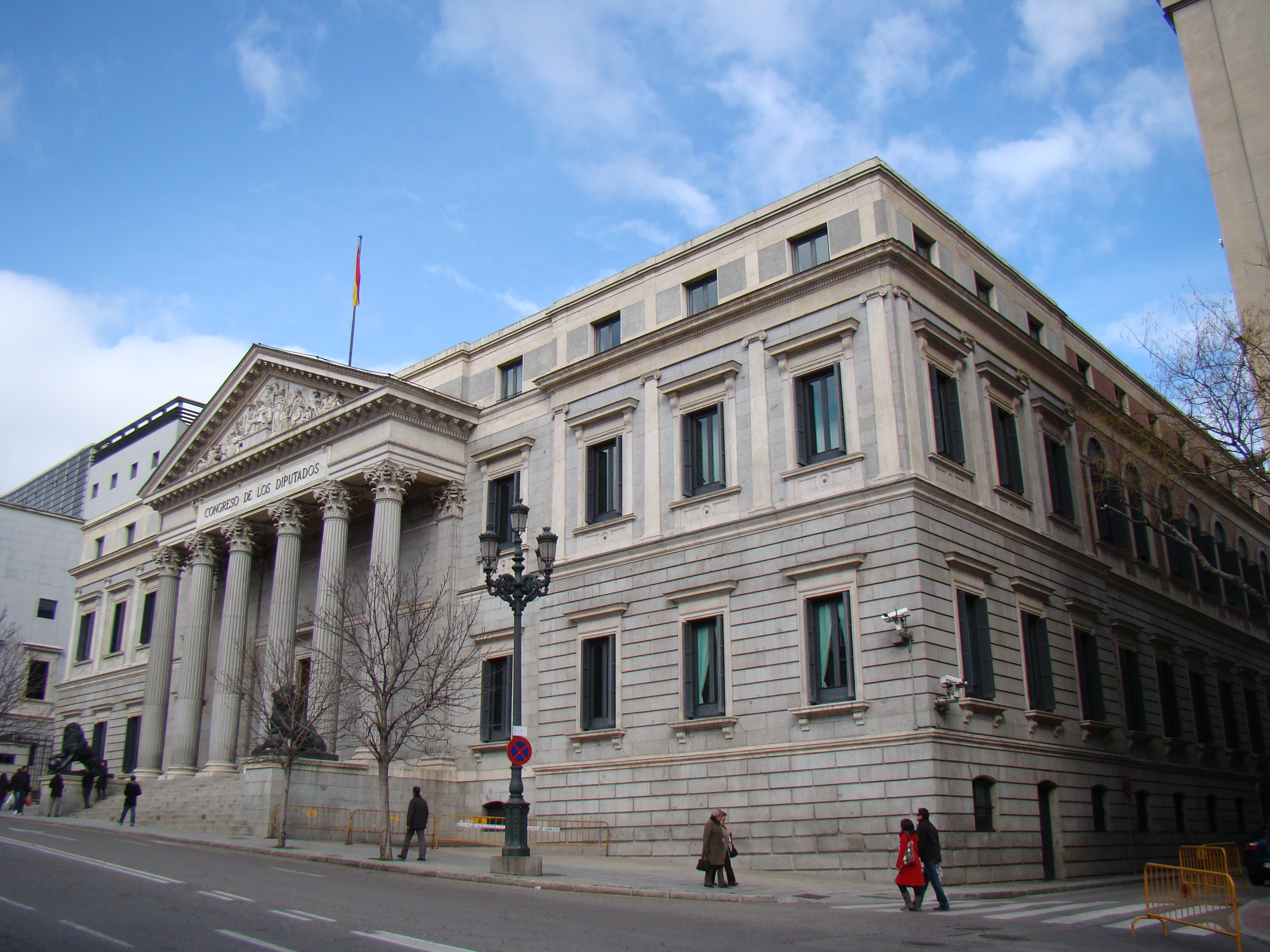
Palacio de las Cortes

Though Sanz spent 5 terms and 9 years in the Congress of Deputies, he is hardly known for any personal activity. Not a single time he has been referred to by the press in his MP capacity, be it delivering an address, fathering a legal motion or simply questioning the government. It seems that his engagement boiled down to signing up to initiatives animated by Carlist parliamentary champions, mostly Juan Vázquez de Mella; their scope ranged from education to economy to military issues. The single time he was mentioned single-handedly was when the disciplinary commission considered legal action against Sanz; the motion, eventually abandoned, resulted from his article published in El Correo Español and deemed anti-constitutional. It is not clear whether his performance in the chamber contributed to termination of Sanz's career of a deputy; in 1903 he again stood in Pamplona and somewhat unexpectedly failed to get his ticket renewed.

== Rise to Field Marshal ==
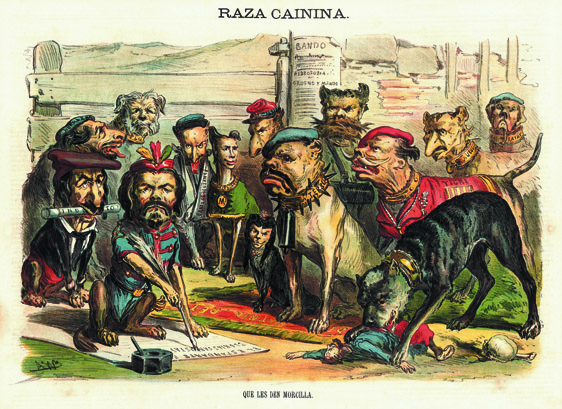
Carlist dogs conspiring

Having obtained the Cortes mandate Sanz, despite his previous moderate engagement in internal party life, emerged as one of the most recognizable Carlist figures. This translated to his somewhat more energetic activities, be it in terms of co-ordinating nationwide projects with nominal party leadership or taking part in public rallies, be it in Pamplona or in Madrid; he also took advantage of his deputy status protesting to civil authorities about alleged mistreatment of Carlist activists. Throughout most of the 1890s, however, he did not assume any major position within the party structures; the regional organization in Castilla la Nueva, where Sanz lived, was led by marqués de Cerralbo, while the one in Navarre, where he originated from, following the death of marqués de Valde-Espina was led by Salvadór Elío Ezpeleta. It was only in the late 1890s when Sanz grew to head of the Madrid circulo, in 1897 assuming also the Navarrese jefatura.

In the very late 1890s Sanz emerged among the party heavyweights. In 1897 he was invited to the claimant's residence in Venice to take part in editing the Carlist doctrinal manifesto, though little is known about his actual contribution to the so-called Acta de Loredan. The following year he was already fully engaged in a Carlist plot, aimed at launching another insurgency. In 1899 he was nominated to a 7-member junta, supposed to co-ordinate action plan of the rising, and grew to its supreme military authority; this was formally recognized by Carlos VII nominating Sanz to mariscal del campo. Full picture of the attempt remains obscure; it seems that the Carlist command put off the insurgency, which in Catalonia got out of hand and materialized as few isolated revolts, known as La Octubrada. During the key period Sanz was in Bayonne, not clear whether part of Carlist smokescreen or actual strategy to disengage from would-be unrest. Also the aftermath period is far from clear. Some authors claim that Sanz was spared the claimant's anger and in 1900 was still considered Minister of War in a would-be rebellious Carlist government. On the other hand, contemporary press reported his alleged differences with Carlos VII, pointed to his supposed opposition to military action and speculated this was the reason for no official reprisal measures having been administered versus Sanz.

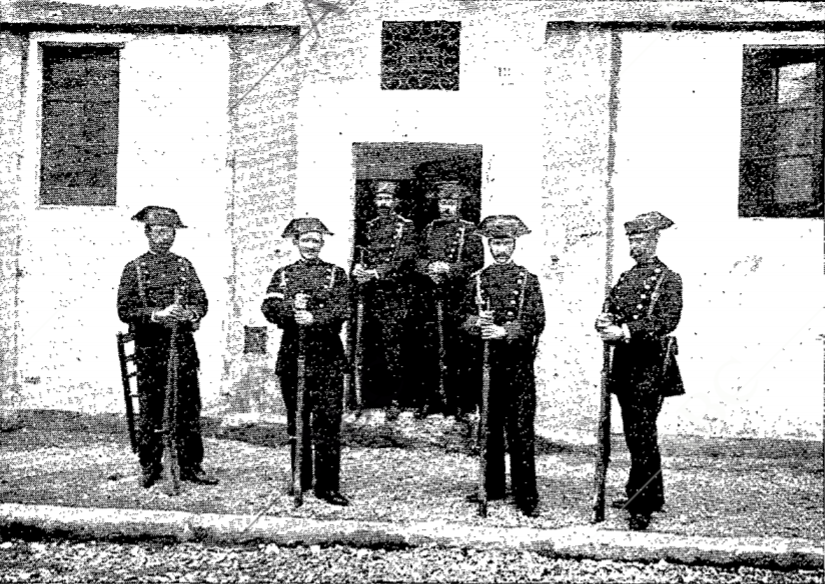
La Octubrada, 1899

La Octubrada caused major shakeup in the Carlist political command, with marqués de Cerralbo replaced by Matías Barrio y Mier as the king's Jefe Delegado. Sanz is not named as a protagonist of the turmoil which rocked top layers of the party, apart that he resigned from the Navarrese jefatura. It seems he did not fall from grace, as in 1902 he was considered member of an auxiliary junta, to be set up as assistance to the ailing Barrio. However, having lost the parliamentary mandate in 1903 he lost also prestigious position within the executive, especially that his friend de Cerralbo was also sidetracked and the party was controlled by a new team.

== Senator ==
Carlist standard

In 1904 Sanz attempted to re-enter the Cortes; instead of Congreso de Diputados he targeted the Senate, fielding his candidature in Navarre. Instead of popular vote, members of the upper chamber were selected by a pre-defined group of electors, named compromisarios; accordingly, the electoral campaign was all about behind-the-stage dealings. Details of the bid are not clear, except that Sanz was endorsed as a Carlist candidate; at that time he was already sort of an iconic Navarrese figure, acknowledged even in not necessarily hostile press couplets. The negotiations must have proven unsuccessful, as he withdrew shortly before the process was concluded. In the mid-1900 he generally disengaged himself from great politics and focused on the Toledan milieu. Apart from rising to executive of the local Asociación de Misiones Pedagógicas, in 1906 he entered Junta Municipal de Toledo and in 1908 became adjunto del Juzgado Municipal. Having engaged in setting up the municipal Cámara de Comercio, in the early 1910s he emerged as its first president.

In 1914 Sanz resumed his Senate bid, again from Navarre. There is no information on the background of the campaign, though apparently this time the backstage haggling proved successful: he was elected among 3 candidates who enjoyed massive advantage over the remaining contenders. The victory again proved to be the first one in a string of successive triumphs: Sanz got his mandate prolonged in 1916, 1918 and 1919. His 4 terms came to an end in 1920; it is not clear whether he lost or decided to terminate the parliamentarian career. Unlike in case of his deputy record, Sanz's stand in the upper chamber was not passive. Though in terms of legal initiatives he is noted only for fathering a draft law related to officer retirement rules, the project he eventually withdrew, Sanz engaged in a number of army-related discussions – he contributed to debates on internal organization, military academies, remuneration and awards, war in Morocco, retirement or military justice. He formed part of commissions related to the army and the navy, though also used to join those focusing on legal, budgetary and economic issues. Though his term in the Senate fell on the years of the Great War, neither in the official Senate record nor in the press he was recorded discussing Spanish position towards the warring parties.

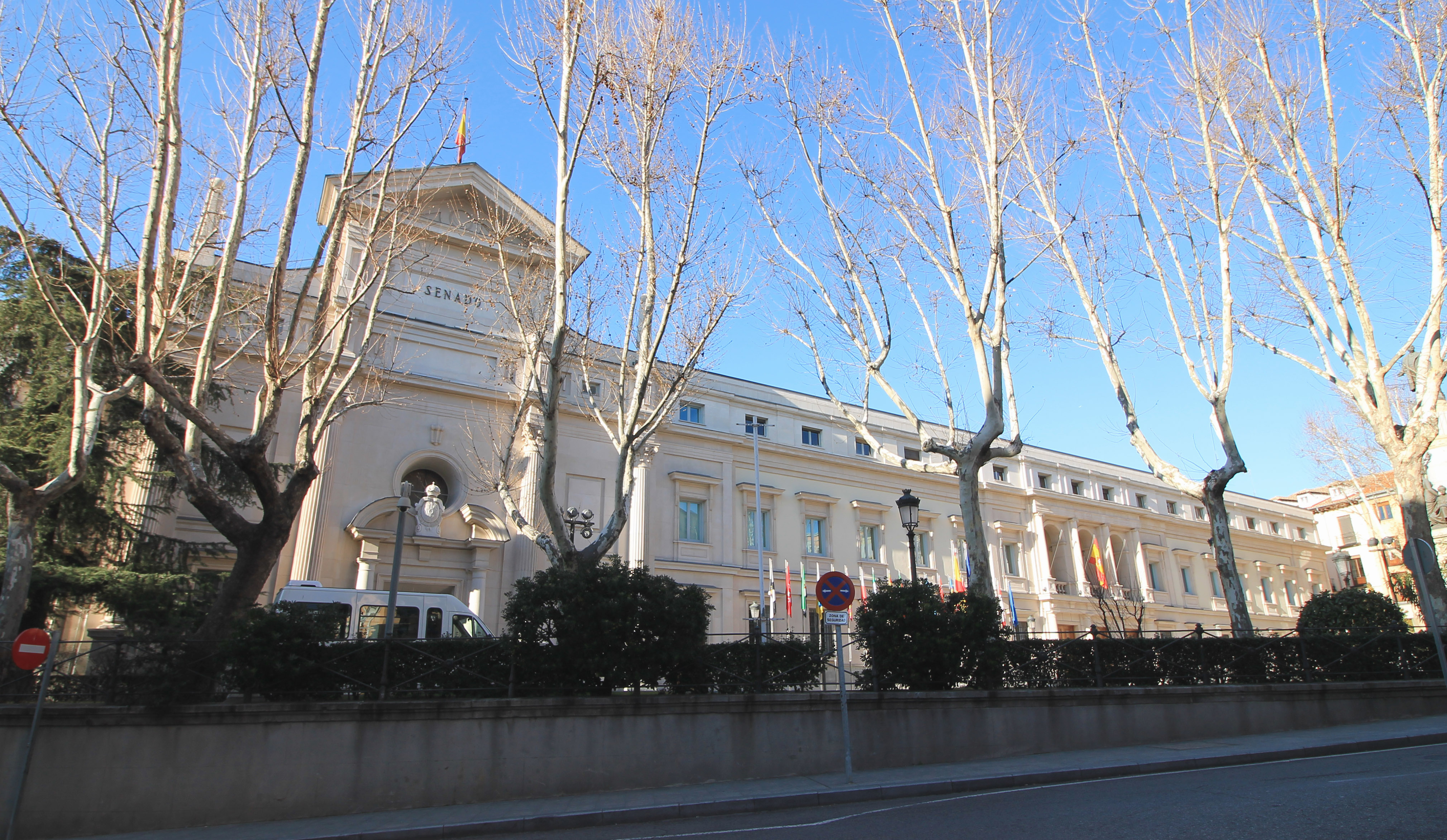
Palacio del Senado

Sanz's term in the Senate was not marked by particular controversies; it was only once that he came under fire as alleged "generalisimo de Requetés", a freshly created Carlist youth organization, whose members were suspected of running a sabotage campaign. He denied any involvement and indeed, at the time the Requeté organization was led by another Carlist military, Joaquín Llorens. Due to his advanced age and longtime parliamentary record Sanz acquired prestigious status: in 1916 Navarrese MPs and senators from all parties elected him their dean.

== Mellista ==
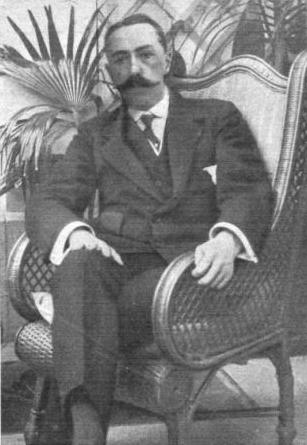
Jaime III, 1918

During the 1910s Carlism was paralyzed by conflict between the claimant Don Jaime and the key theorist, Juan Vázquez de Mella. Sanz, due to his Senate seat a member of Junta Superior Central Tradicionalista, was not a protagonist of the strife, though his links with Cerralbo placed him rather among the Mellistas. In 1916, when the Navarrese jefe Francisco Martínez found it impossible to square the circle of conflicting loyalties and resigned, Cerralbo appointed Sanz as his replacement; at that time Don Jaime was isolated in his house arrest in Austria and the party was almost entirely taken over by de Mella supporters. In the mid-1910s Sanz was already considered "claro promellista".

Since the early 1918 marqués de Cerralbo tried to step down as Carlist political leader. In April 1918 he managed to get his resignation as president of Junta Superior accepted; its members elected Sanz his temporary replacement. At the age of 74 he formally became the Carlist political leader, though missing final confirmation from his non-contactable king he appeared either as "vicepresidente de Junta Suprema" or "presidente en funciones", holding what was named "presidencia interina" or "presidencia accidental". The second half of 1918 was a period of general bewilderment among the Carlists, with de Mella effectively acting as their political leader in Spain. Sanz was not noted for any specific initiative except a note he co-edited and promoted, finally issued by the Navarrese Diputación: it re-claimed traditional provincial rights, scrapped in 1839, and was intended as a measure countering Basque nationalist demands, presented to president Wilson.

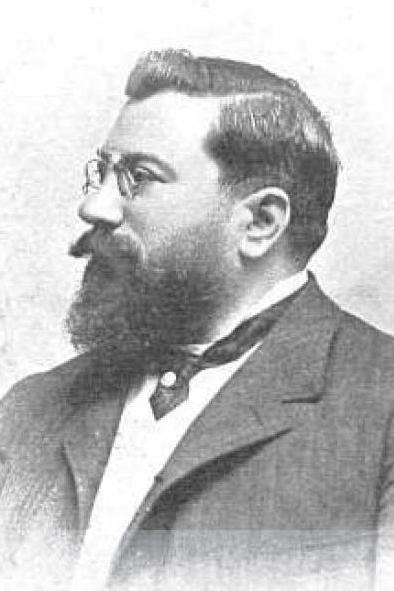
Juan Vazquez de Mella

In the first days of January 1919 Don Jaime arrived in Paris; he immediately demanded that Sanz, de Mella and de Cerralbo report to him in person. Sanz was anticipating the worst and possibly preparing a would-be secession, he took steps intended to transfer ownership of the party mouthpiece, El Correo Español, to a commercial company controlled by the Mellistas. The Spanish Carlists were eventually denied French visas and did not show up in Paris, but as late as in February 1919 the clash did not seem inevitable: Don Jaime confirmed Sanz as temporary president of Junta Superior. Aware of a belligerent manifesto, prepared by the claimant, Sanz asked that its publication be suspended; he was surprised to find it printed in Correo.

Details of the final breakup are not clear; there is no known document in which Don Jaime dismissed Sanz from the presidency or expulsed him from the party. However, in late February 1919 he already appointed Pascual Comín Moya as the new, temporary party leader. In April the 75-year-old Sanz was already recorded as active in Junta Central of a new, separate Mellista organization. Prior to the 1920 elections he was among the key Mellist pundits supporting a non-dynastical Federación Monárquica, though he was also uneasy that general party assembly failed to materialize. Once his senate mandate expired he seems to have withdrawn from politics; starting 1921 there is no further information on his public activity.

== See also ==
- Carlism
- Mellismo
