= Juan Vázquez de Mella =

Spanish politician and political theorist

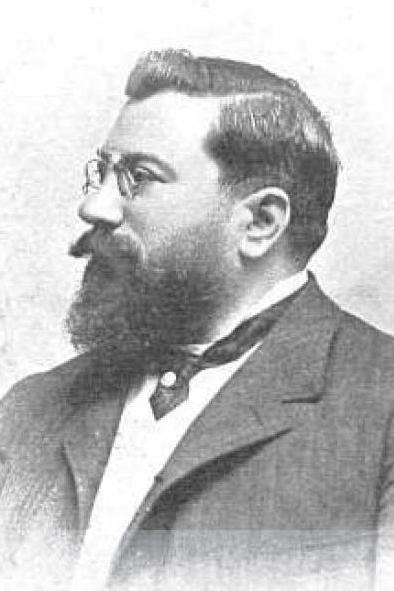
- Born: Juan Vázquez de Mella y Fanjul; 8 June 1862; Cangas de Onís, Kingdom of Spain
- Died: 26 February 1928 (age 66); Madrid, Kingdom of Spain

Philosophical work
- Era: 19th/20th century philosophy
- Region: Western philosophy: Spanish philosophy
- School: Carlism; Mellismo; Traditionalism

Juan Vázquez de Mella y Fanjul (8 June 1861 – 18 February 1928) was a Spanish politician and a political theorist. He is counted among the greatest traditionalist thinkers and is sometimes considered the finest author of Spanish Traditionalism of all time. A politician active within Carlism, he served as a longtime Cortes deputy and one of the party leaders. He championed his own political strategy, known as Mellismo, which led to secession and the formation of a separate grouping.

== Family and youth ==
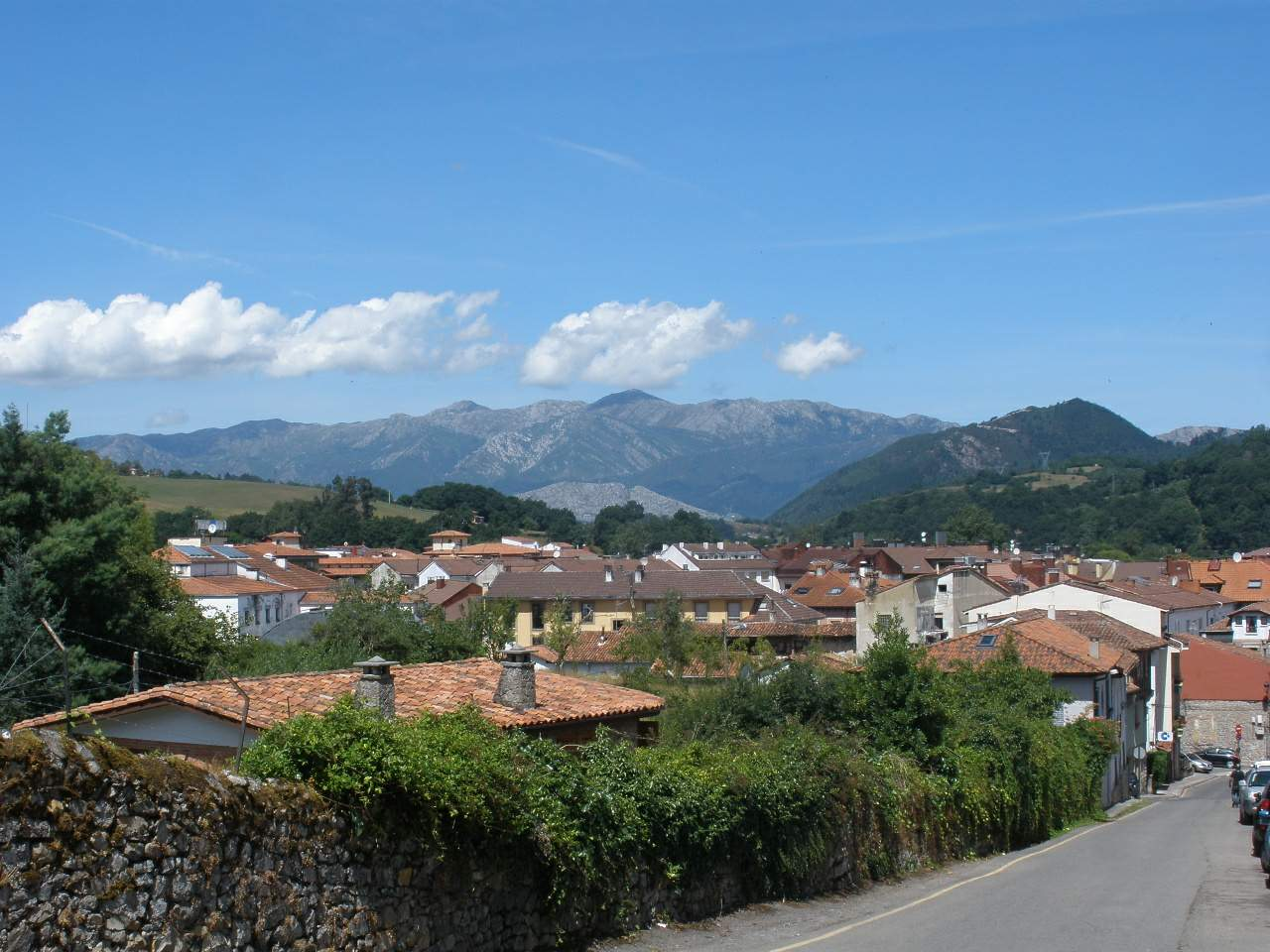
Cangas de Onís

Juan Antonio María Casto Francisco de Sales Vázquez de Mella y Fanjul was descendant to an old, though not particularly distinguished Galician family; its best known representative was a 15th-century-cardinal of Zamora. There were mostly military men among Juan's ancestors along the paternal line, related to various towns in Galicia; military were also his grandfather, Andrés Vázquez de Mella, a native of Filgueira, and his father, Juan Antonio Vázquez de Mella y Varela (died 1874), born in Boimorto. The latter, rising to teniente coronel, proved a rather restless figure and by some was described as exaltado. The man of clear Liberal convictions, for supporting the Espartero coups he was fired from the post of administrador de aduanas in 1840 and imprisoned in 1843. Soon restored to previous post in Lugo, in 1848 he was promoted to intendente provincial in Oviedo, the same year posted to Seville and later to Málaga. In the late 1850s transferred to Covadonga, he resigned from the army in 1860, once his application to join the troops fighting in Morocco had been rejected. Active in the local Liberal realm, allegedly he declared the republic in Cangas in 1873; his son later denied that he had been a Republican.

Juan Antonio married Teresa Fanjul Blanco (died 1893), a native of Amieva and descendant to a locally recognized family; her father ran a commerce and tanning business. The couple settled in Cangas and had only one child. After death of her husband, the widow was first assisted by her brother, who inherited the family enterprises; following differences with her sibling she moved to live with her cousins in Galicia, where Juan spent his childhood. It seems that he identified himself with Galicia rather than with Asturias. According to opponents he was "born into opulence"; he rather admitted "en las perspectivas de la opulencia", which failed to materialize following death of his father; according to some, he spent most of his life bordering poverty and actually died in poverty.

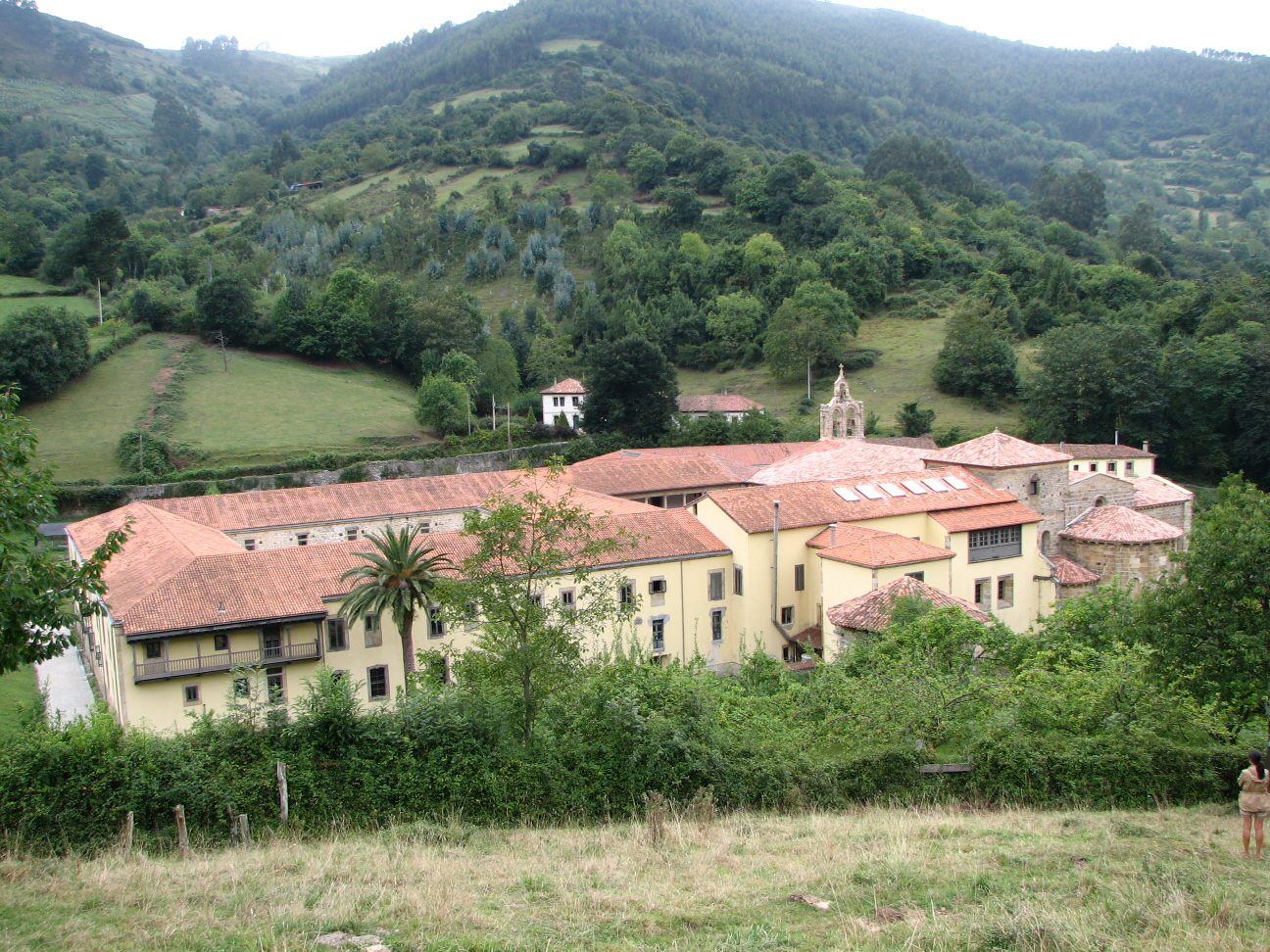
Valdediós college

In 1874 the young Juan entered Seminario del Valdediós near Villaviciosa; though not an excellent student, he used to gain "diplomas de tercera clase" a few times. He demonstrated a penchant for letters, reading books and periodicals instead of playing with his classmates. Having obtained bachillerato in 1877, he enrolled at Universidad de Santiago; he preferred to study Filosofia y Letras, but as such department did not exist in Santiago at the time, he settled for law, the subject he approached with disgust. As a result, he did not make a systematic student, recorded rather for pursuing his own interest and spending more time in libraries than in lecture halls. The year of his graduation is not clear; none of the sources consulted clarifies how he made a living in the early 1880s, when he lived with his mother in Santiago. Tending to solitude from early childhood he has never married and had no children, though at one point he was supposed to marry a Pamplonesa, María Baleztena Ascárate.

== Provincial columnist to Madrid editor-in-chief (before 1890) ==
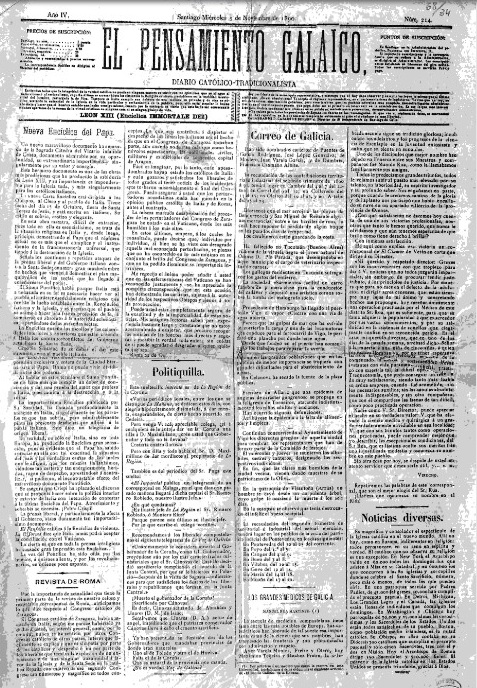
El Pensamiento Galaico

Juan was orphaned by his militantly Liberal father when entering the teenage period; despite Carlist antecedents among his paternal uncles, there is neither any indication that he inherited Traditionalist outlook along the family line. Scholars tend rather to suspect that the young Vázquez de Mella embraced it during the academic period. For some time he served as secretary to professor José Fernández Sánchez, an acquaintance of Marcelino Menéndez y Pelayo; de Mella had access to their lengthy correspondence and was exposed to the doctrine. He left the university already as a Traditionalist; unlike most Carlists, he espoused the concept not by means of inheritance or intuition, but as a result of intellectual speculation. In the early 1880s he was first noted in public realm as an orator in the compostelan Ateneo and in Academia Católica de Santiago.

At unspecified time though probably in the mid-1880s de Mella commenced co-operation with some conservative periodicals; the two identified are La Restauración, a Madrid weekly managed by Francisco de Paula Quereda, and the Santiago daily El Pensamiento Galaico. Little is known about his contributions, as there are almost no copies of both preserved in the archives. At least his Pensamiento pieces must have made an impact beyond Galicia, as they were noticed in Madrid; this refers in particular to a series of vehemently anti-Nocedal articles, published in wake of the Integrist breakup from Carlism in the late 1880s. As the breakaway Nocedalistas controlled El Siglo Futuro, previously the national party mouthpiece, the claimant Carlos VII decided to set up a new semi-official Carlist newspaper; the daily materialized in 1888 as El Correo Español, desperately short of good contributors. According to some scholars it was the Carlist political leader, Marqués de Cerralbo, who invited de Mella to contribute; according to the others, it was rather the manager of Correo, Luis Llauder.

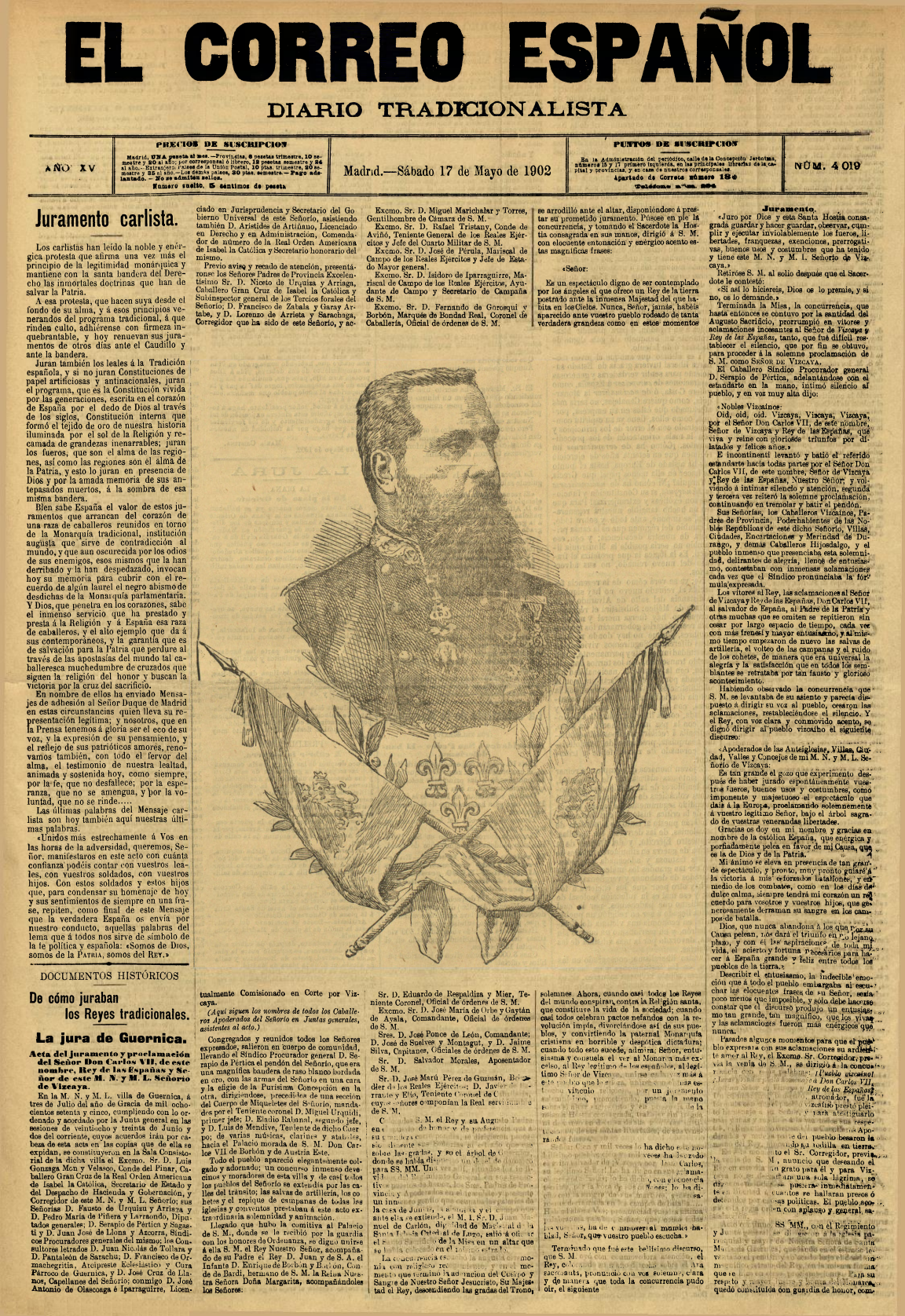
El Correo Español

At the turn of the decades de Mella started to contribute to Correo as a correspondent; in the meantime he grew to manager of El Pensamiento Galaico, the job held until 1890. Initially he kept publishing under various pen-names, most of his essays having been doctrinal ones, with some focus also on society and regional establishments. At some point de Mella was invited to move to Madrid and enter the editorial board, the offer he accepted. When Correo achieved stability and moved out of its teething phase, Llauder decided to return to Barcelona; his position of director was assumed by the former redactor jefé, Leandro Herrero, whose job was in turn offered to de Mella. Either in 1890 or 1891 de Mella became editor-in-chief, formally subordinate of Herrero, but politically instructed to follow the guidance of Cerralbo. Scholars are not certain who followed whom; they note that already at that point Cerralbo was visibly impressed by de Mella and tended to accept his authority of a theorist.

== Rise to political prominence (1890–1900) ==
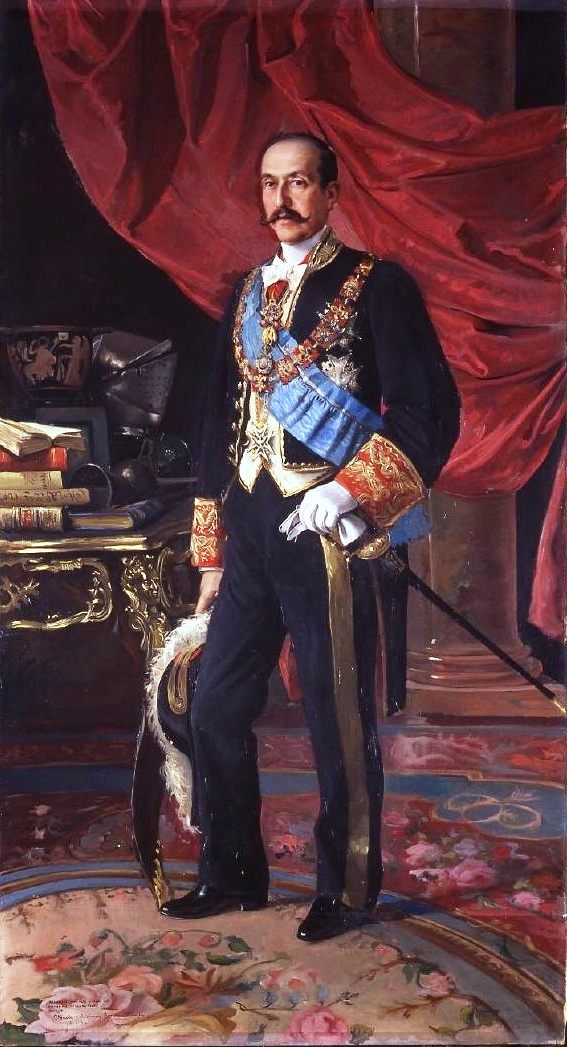
Marquis of Cerralbo

De Mella's assumption of chief editor role stirred controversy. He was reported as rather loosely approaching his duties, working short hours, being absent from the office for 2–3 days and pursuing own interests. Alarmed by Herrero, in the early 1890s the claimant's secretary Melgar repeatedly demanded from Venice that Cerralbo brings his protégé into discipline, the calls which produced little effect. De Mella kept contributing broadly aimed and high quality pieces, but the daily was left mostly to Herrero and the administrative manager, Puiggrós. This was to continue until the late 1890s, also de Mella himself increasingly disappointed with editorial work.

De Mella owed his position not only to his pen, but also to co-operation with Cerralbo. In the early 1890s the marquis launched an innovative scheme of touring the country and mobilizing support by means of public gatherings and close meetings; de Mella used to accompany him, acknowledging the journeys and Cerralbo's addresses in booklets. At times he took the floor himself, due to oratorical skills gaining more and more attention. During the 1891 elections to the Cortes he was placed on the Carlist list in Valls; a typical cuckoo candidate, he lost. He renewed his bid from the Navarrese Estella, another constituency he had no personal relation with. Following enormously conflictive campaign against the governmental candidate this time de Mella won, commencing a string of Carlist Estella victories which was to last almost continuously until the end of Restoration.

A member of tiny Carlist minority, in the Cortes de Mella exercised little influence over the legislative work. However, he soon gained attention as an individual, taking on most respected politicians and his exhilarating addresses exercising hypnotic effect. Increasingly respected especially among the Conservatives, in the mid-1890s he was offered Ministry of Education, the post he declined. Re-elected from Estella in 1896 and 1898, he was already a Carlist and parliamentary star; also addresses at public meetings were received frenetically. The claimant was delighted; in 1897 de Mella was invited to visit him in Venice, when he heavily contributed to the programmatic document known as Acta de Loredan.

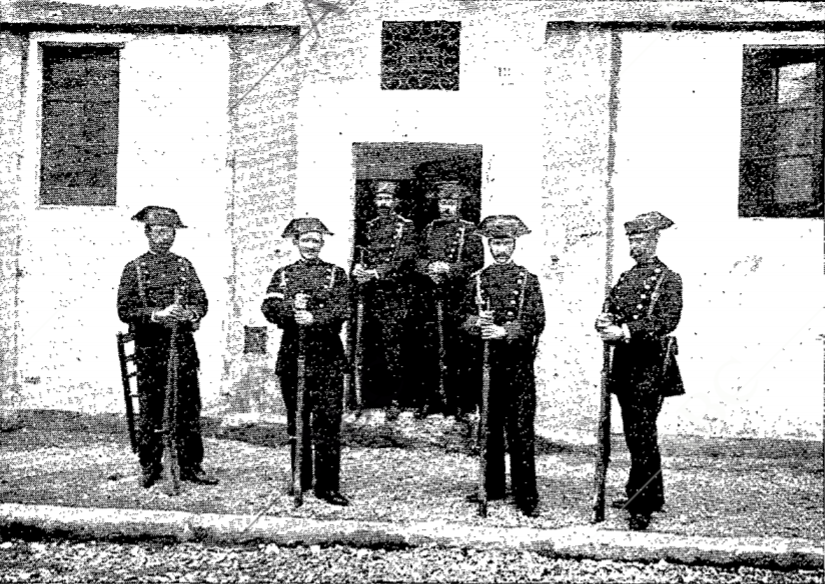
La Octubrada

Acting on Carlos VII's order de Mella resigned from the parliament in 1898 and did not take part in the 1899 elections. At that time the Carlists were mounting a coup supposed to topple the Restoration regime; de Mella contributed propaganda wise, fathering ambiguous press notes and public addresses. Following another visit to Venice in 1899 he entered a Carlist junta entrusted with wartime preparations. As the claimant developed doubts, in 1900 de Mella seemed to side with those determined to rise even in case no order is given, though there is no evidence that he actually instigated the rising, which boiled down to a series of minor October 1900 revolts known as La Octubrada. In the aftermath his Madrid house was raided by the police, which seemed minor inconvenience compared to wrath of the claimant. Suspecting the entire party leadership of treason, he ordered de Mella out of Correo.

== Fall from grace and road back to power (1900–1912) ==
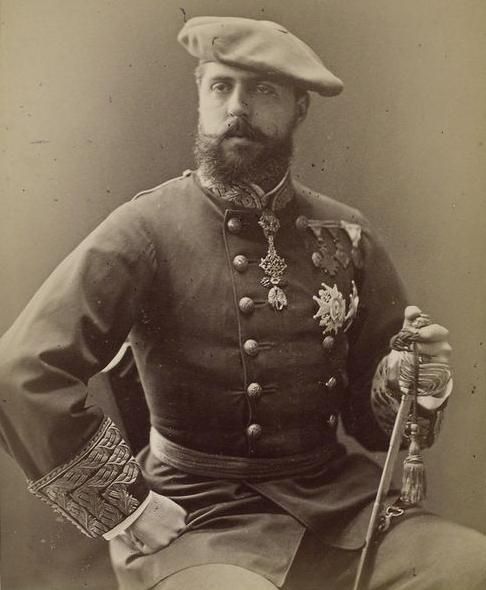
Carlos VII

De Mella decided to comply with the order of his king. It is not clear whether there were any official administrative measures intended against him; possibly fearing further governmental reprisals, in the very late 1900 via France he left for Portugal and settled in Lisbon. He spent there some 3 years on intermittent basis, at times visiting Spain and contributing to various Spanish periodicals. Not reconciled with the claimant, in 1901 he was even suspected of plotting with Cerralbo and Solferino; the scheme comprised forced abdication of Carlos VII in favor of his son, Don Jaime. In 1903 he obtained the royal pardon and was allowed to renew his Cortes bid. Following death of a Carlist Aoiz deputy Miguel Irigaray, de Mella took his seat in 1904. In the 1905 campaign he stood and won in Pamplona, the constituency he would represent continuously for 13 years to come, though sporadically he also stood in his native Asturias.

De Mella's position within Carlism was still precarious. As a nationally recognized figure – in 1906 he received invitation to the Academy - he was an asset the party could not have afforded to ignore, though the claimant remained suspicious and the new party leader, Matías Barrio y Mier, was determined to impose total loyalty. De Mella developed particular dislike towards him, in private sparing his jefe little insult. Apart from personal enmity, the two clashed in terms of political strategy, as de Mella first demonstrated what would later become a trademark of Mellismo: a penchant for maximalist extreme-Right coalitions. Following death of Barrio in early 1909 de Mella campaigned to have Cerralbo restored as leader and was furious to see Bartolomé Feliú appointed instead; some considered also himself a possible candidate.

Carlist standard

Following 1909 death of Carlos VII his son as the new Carlist king found himself pressed to dismiss Feliú; he opted for a compromise, confirming the nomination but appointing de Mella his own personal secretary. He was called to Frohsdorf to prepare something like a new Acta de Loredan, but relations did not go smoothly, the two developing suspicions versus each other. After a joint trip to Rome in May 1910 de Mella was replaced with Artero Samaniego, disillusioned - rather mutually - with his new monarch. During the next 2 years the group, already dubbed Mellistas, sabotaged Jefe Delegado, in 1910 openly promoting non-dynastic ultra-conservative coalitions against Feliú-approved accords strictly conditioned by dynastic claims. Constantly dubbing Feliú as incompetent leader, in 1912 Mella decided to launch a full-scale onslaught; he accused jefe delegado of illegitimately holding the jefatura and demanded his deposition, in private threatening the claimant with rejecting his rule as deprived of "legitimacy of execution". Don Jaime gave in and by the end of 1912 he re-appointed de Cerralbo as president of Junta Superior.

== In control (1912–1918) ==
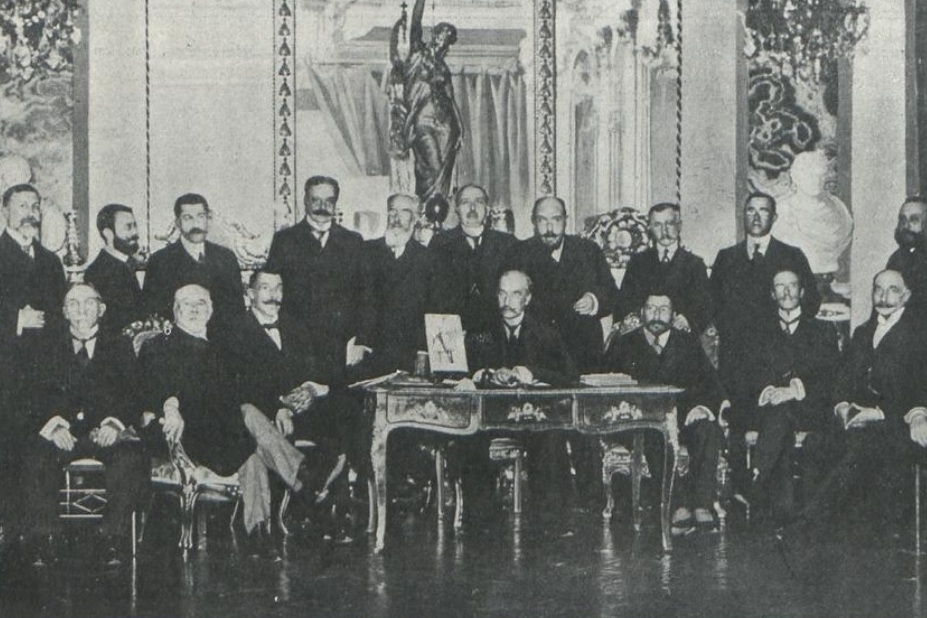
Among Carlist executives, 1913

Some scholars claim that with de Cerralbo aging, tired of conflict and increasingly disoriented politically, it was rather de Mella who assumed command of the party from the back seat. The Carlist parliamentarian contingent was dominated by his personality; in the 30-member party top body, Junta Superior, around one third were leaning towards Mellismo. As de Cerralbo re-organized the national executive in 10 sections, Mella monopolized the ones of propaganda and press while his followers dominated in electoral and admin ones. Only El Correo Español remained a battlefield with supporters of Don Jaime, but it was increasingly taken over by the Mellistas. De Mella was already planning general overhaul of the party, waiting only for the old-style leaders to die out. At that stage he probably hoped that Don Jaime could be pushed to a decorative role, reduced to "un rey a su imagen y semejanza".

Outbreak of the Great War played into de Mella's hands: Don Jaime was left hardly contactable in his house arrest in Austria. The Mellistas took almost full control of the election strategy; the Carlist Cortes campaigns of 1914, 1916 and 1918 were visibly marked by de Mella's vision. It aimed at a non-dynastical alliance of ultra-Right, leading to emergence of a maximalist ultra-Right party, perhaps a new incarnation of Traditionalism, which in turn would do away with liberal democracy and ensure passage to Traditionalist, corporative system. The strategy produced co-operation with a branch of the Conservatives named Mauristas, with another branch named Ciervistas, with the Integrists and with other small groups, but it also demonstrated its limitations. The alliances hardly outlived electoral campaigns and did not improve Carlist standing in the parliament; in regions with strong local identity party militants grumbled that fuerismo might suffer in a hypothetical ultra-Right alliance.

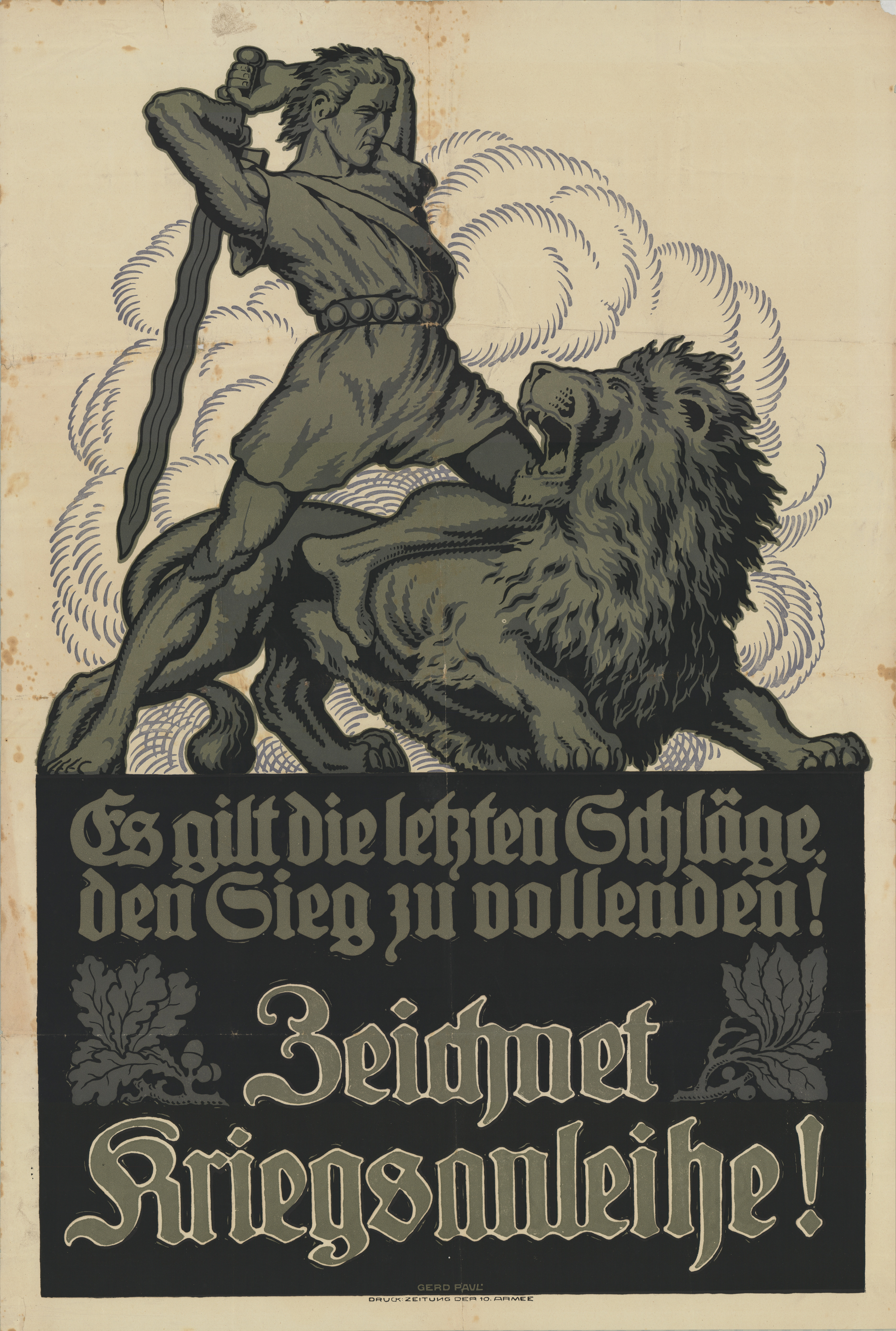
British lion defeated

Following outbreak of the Great War earlier demonstrated pro-German de Mella's sympathies, very much shared by the party rank and file, turned into a full-blown campaign. Combined with his personal gallophobia and traditional Carlist anti-British sentiment, it produced numerous booklets and lectures; technically they supported Spanish neutrality, but effectively they favored the Central Powers. The claimant remained ambiguous and it was rather some Carlists from his entourage, especially Melgar, who openly opposed de Mella with their pro-Entente campaign. Today there are different opinions as to the role of World War One alliances in general de Mella's vision. According to some the question was central and Mellismo is simply a pro-German stance. Most suggest that it stemmed from ideological premises, quote passages praising anti-Liberal German regime and lambasting Masonic, democratic, parliamentarian British and French systems. Some relate germanophilia to the Mellista version of regeneracionismo in international politics. There are comments suggesting that victory of the Central Powers was expected to facilitate takeover of Spanish political scene by extreme Right, while few students suggest that the war issue was of no relevance at all.

== Breakup (1919) ==
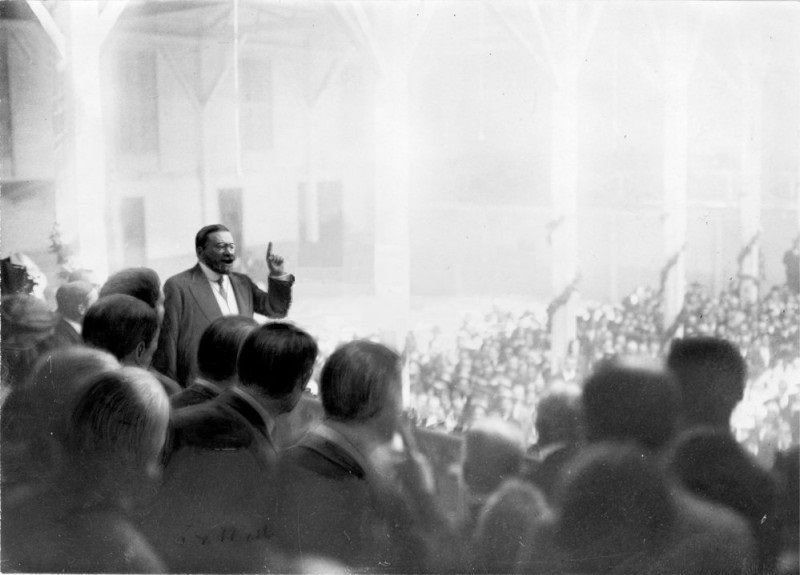
de Mella speaking, 1910s

In 1918 de Mella was losing ground: electoral alliances failed to produce major gains, course of the Great War made pro-German attitude pointless and undermined position of its advocates, some regional jefaturas kept voicing dissent and de Cerralbo, increasingly tired of his own double-loyalty, finally managed to have his resignation accepted, temporarily replaced by another Mellista, Cesáreo Sanz Escartín. Moreover, during the 1918 elections supposed to run as usual from Pamplona, for reasons which are not entirely clear de Mella withdrew. In early 1919 the claimant was released from his house arrest in Austria, arrived in Paris and after 2 years of almost total silence came out with 2 manifestos In somewhat unclear circumstances published in early February in Correo Español, they explicitly denounced disobedience of unnamed Carlist leaders failing to sustain neutral policy and indicated that command structures of the party would be re-organized.

De Mella and his supporters concluded that the strategy employed previously in struggle for domination in the party – cornering the claimant in private to elicit his conformity – would no longer work and that an ultimate all-out confrontation was imminent. He mounted a media counter-offensive, going public with charges disseminated confidentially in 1912 and presenting Don Jaime as a ruler who lost his legitimacy: for years he remained passive and inactive, pursued hypocritical policy of declaring neutrality but in fact supporting Entente, departed from Catholic orthodoxy, ignored traditional Carlist collegial bodies embarking on Cesarist policy, toyed with the party and - clear reference to his lack of offspring - behaved irresponsibly; all in all, his latest moves were nothing but a "Jaimada", a coup within and against Traditionalism. None of the conflicting parties referred to the question of political strategy as to the point of contention.

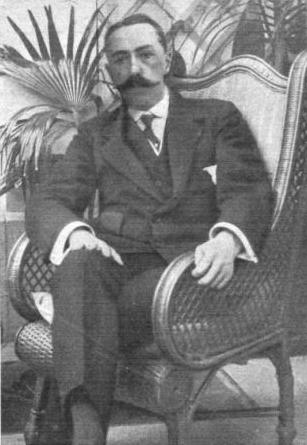
Jaime III

Though initially it might have appeared that the strengths of both sides were comparable, Don Jaime soon tilted the balance in his favor. His men reclaimed control over El Correo Español and he replaced San Escartín with former germanophile politicians who seemed pro-Mellistas but turned loyal to the royal house, first Pascual Comín and then Luis Hernando de Larramendi. When Alfonsist and Liberal press cheered anticipated demise of conflict-ridden Carlism, many party members earlier demonstrating unease about Don Jaime started to have second thoughts. Vázquez de Mella, conscious of his strong position among MPs and local jefes, responded with a call to stage a grand assembly, hoping that the party heavyweights would help him regain control. Some scholars claim that at that point he already acknowledged that the struggle to control Jaimist structures was pointless; they interpret his appeal as decision to walk out and build a new party. The showdown lasted no longer than two weeks. By the end of February 1919 de Mella openly opted for an own organization, setting Centro de Acción Tradicionalista as his temporary headquarters in Madrid.

== Political failure and retirement (after 1919) ==
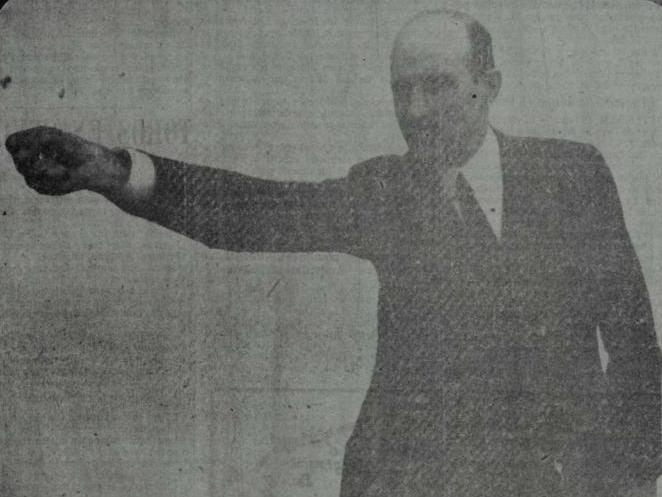
Victor Pradera speaking

Though de Mella lost the battle to control Carlism, on rebellious path he was followed by most of its local leaders, MPs and otherwise distinguished figures; it was only among the rank and file that Mellistas gained little support, the group resembling an army of generals with rather few soldiers. Before the 1919 elections de Mella set up Centro Católico Tradicionalista, intended as a stepping stone towards an ultra-Right alliance; the campaign produced mere 4 mandates and de Mella himself failed to gain a ticket. Offered a ministerial post in a new government of national unity he declined, claiming he could never align himself with the 1876 constitution and its system. The 1920 elections proved even worse, with Mellistas gaining only 2 tickets; de Mella, who lost again, soon launched his bid for seat in Tribunal Supremo, but failed to mount sufficient support among conservative parties and suffered prestigious defeat.

By 1921 it was clear that de Mella was struggling organizing his own party. His dislike for systematic effort and commitment - demonstrated already during academic years, Correo management, inability to produce a major written opus, never completed Academia entry address and solitary lifestyle - again took its toll. He was withdrawing into periods of inactivity and already pondered upon his role of a pundit, providing guidance from the back seat. In the meantime, more and more of his followers were defecting to other Right-wing formations. When a grand Mellist assembly materialized in October 1922 in Zaragoza, it was controlled by supporters of Víctor Pradera, who instead of an ultra-Right maximalist coalition advocated a broad conservative alliance based on the lowest common denominator. Anticipating defeat de Mella did not attend; instead he sent a letter. Once again reasserting his anti-system views he confirmed Traditionalist monarchy as an ultimate goal and declared himself committed to work towards it as theorist and ideologue, though not as a politician any more.

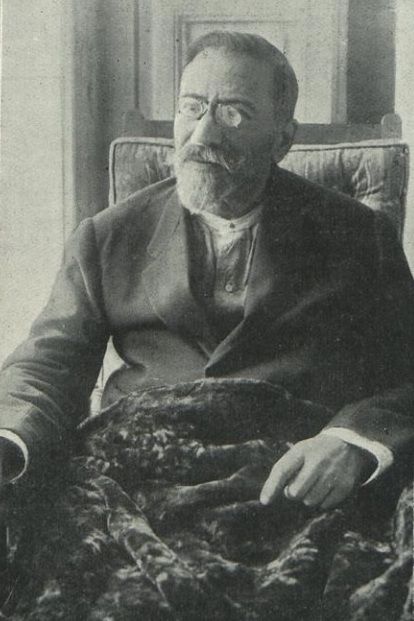
de Mella, mid-1920s

De Mella did not take part in works of the newly established Partido Católico Tradicionalista, the more so as in 1923 the Primo de Rivera coup brought national political life to a standstill by banning all political parties. Initially he might have been inclined to support the dictatorship, as the press informed about his work to set up a new political formation and in 1924 he was received by Primo himself. Whatever his views were, in early 1925 he already had few doubts about the dictature; he considered it a pocket version of a grand political shakeup needed by the country and in January 1925 ridiculed it as "golpe de escoba", though he also allegedly confirmed that directorio implemented some Traditionalist ideas. His last public appearance fell on early 1924; a diabetic, he suffered further health problems and in the summer of 1924 had his leg amputated. He remained a public figure and until early 1925 the press systematically reported about his health conditions. He died shortly after having completed a philosophical study on Eucharist, his death widely discussed by Spanish periodicals.

== Thought ==
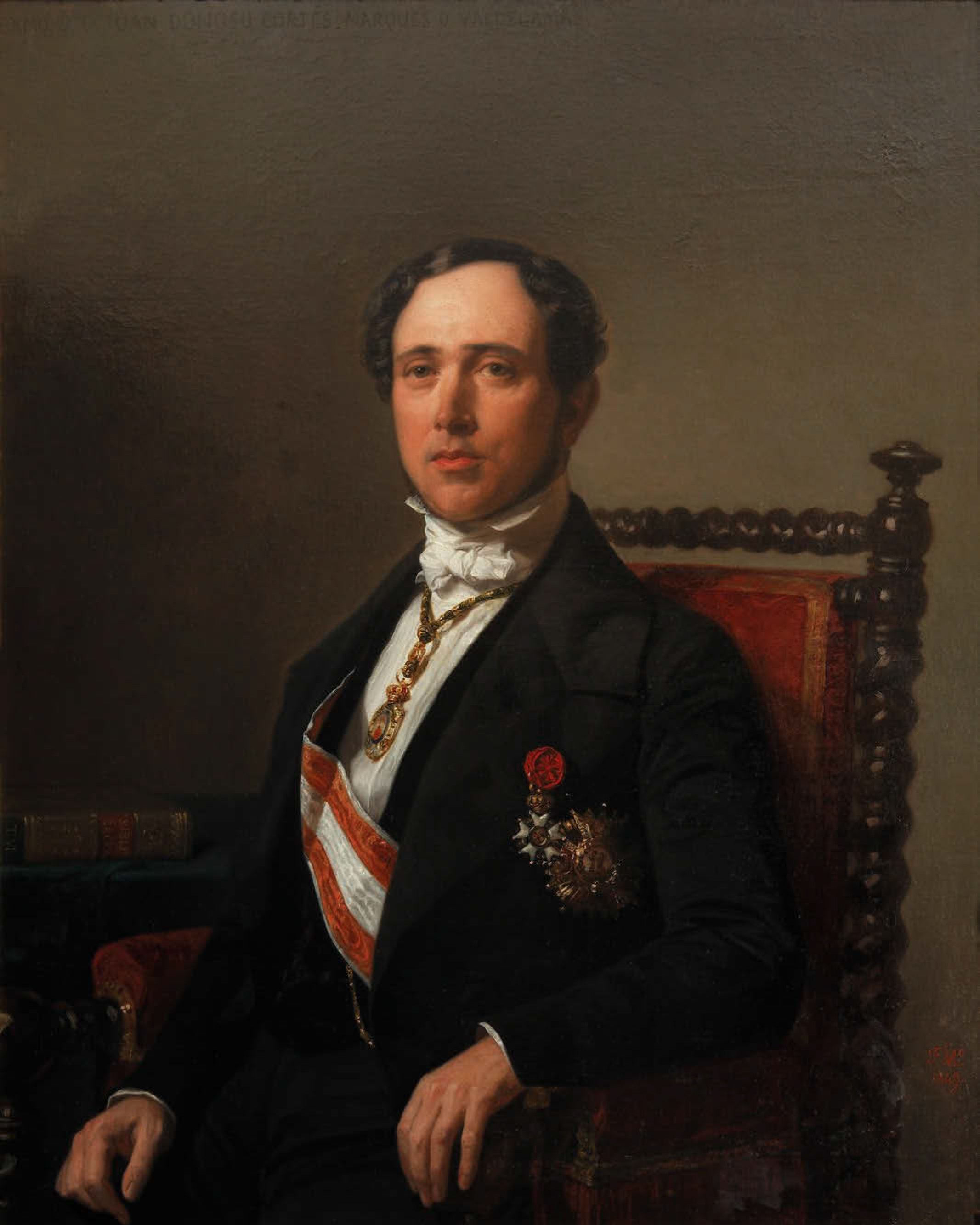
Juan Donoso Cortes

De Mella's writings are typically categorized as political theory. He is considered indebted mostly to Balmes and Dónoso, though also to Aparisi and other Neo-Catholics, Aquinas, Suárez and Leo XIII. Some students maintain that de Mella was greatly influenced by Gil Robles. He was not familiar with works of the most notable foreign Traditionalist thinkers. In terms of doctrinal profile de Mella is almost unanimously considered a Traditionalist; moreover, his vision is often presented as one of the most classical incarnations – if not the most classical incarnation indeed – of the doctrine. As such, it features a loosely organized and rather withdrawn state, envisioned as a lightweight superstructure placed over different types of largely autonomous and overlapping functional, geographical or professional communities. Political sovereignty lies with a monarch equipped with strong but highly limited powers; such entity is united by common orthodoxy, defined by Catholic faith and Spanish tradition. Exact nature of these components were elaborated down to minuscule details.

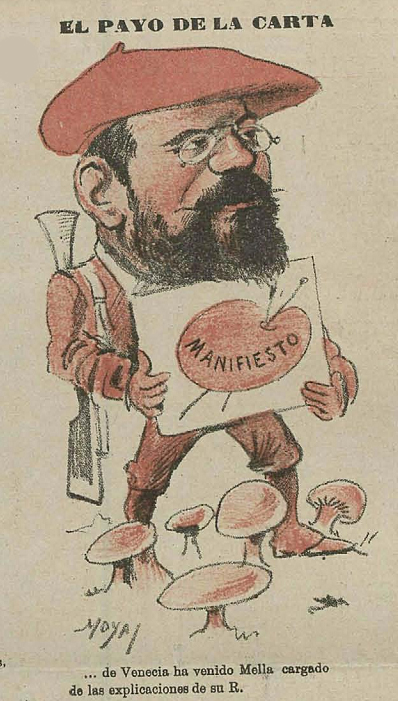
de Mella preparing Acta de Loredan

Key elements of de Mella's thought are defined as society, religion, family, regionalism, tradition and monarchy. The very core of de Mella's concept, however, considered also his most original contribution to Traditionalist thought, was his idea of a society. Though many thinkers before him dedicated considerable attention to the problem and underlined that it was not a contractual body but a result of natural development, most scholars agree that it was de Mella who introduced the theory of social sovereignty. Different from political sovereignty exercised exclusively by the monarch, it attributes to communities the right to govern themselves with no interference on part of external agents, be it the king or other communities; social sovereignty is embodied in the Cortes. Other scholars maintain that the concept was coined by others, but de Mella elevated it to the form he named sociedalismo, which stands for superiority of such a society over state. The concepts of de Mella and Gil led to major transformation of Traditionalism; in the previous phase centred on monarchy, in the subsequent one, to last until the late 20th century, it was centred on society.

There are scholars who emphasize Mellista regionalism, with state to be organized on a federative basis and regions being one type of intermediary bodies and local emanations of a nation. Others, however, tend to reverse the order and focus on nation. All agree that nation is principally about tradition and that neither a nation nor a state possessed own sovereignty. Other core concepts emphasized are family - the key element of social fabric, Catholic unity – the basic building block of Spanish nation, tradition – a general concept, labor, and monarchy, defined as traditional, hereditary, federative and representative. Though Carlist most of his life, de Mella did not emphasize the legitimist ingredient; he did espouse the doctrine of double legitimacy, but as individual who embraced Carlism out of intellectual speculation and not by heritage or intuition, he had little problem totally abandoning the legitimist thread later on.

== Orator and writer ==
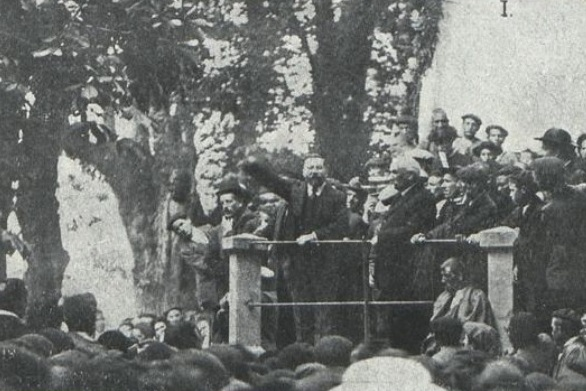
de Mella speaking, 1912

Most of his contemporaries were impressed not with de Mella's writings, his thought or leadership style, but rather with his oratorical skills. This applies to both young men and experienced statesmen; it is often quoted that when listening to a then unknown de Mella in the Cortes, Antonio Cánovas mumbled in amazement: "¿Quién es ese monstruo?" De Mella exercised hypnotic effect on huge public gatherings and limited audiences alike; it is not infrequent to find reports of listeners brought by his addresses to the borders of frenzy and hysteria. This was so despite the fact that de Mella was not gifted with impressive posture: mid-height, tending to overweight and lacking a mesmerizing voice, he used to transform when taking the floor. It is recorded that each his address was a great show: body language of eye movement, head movement, gestures and steps combined with master command of verbal communication bestowed upon him "a majesty of a lion". Some scholars consider de Mella one of the greatest speakers of Spanish parliamentarism. However, his harangues were not shows only; many of de Mella's addresses were printed as booklets. It is not clear whether in general he was improvising or rather coming with at least a sketch of the text pre-prepared; as a huge number of his addresses were reconstructed on basis of his private papers, it seems that the latter was the case. Most of the addresses published are in range of some 500–800 words, which would make less than 10 minute speech. Some are up to 1,600 words, requiring attention of a listener for slightly less than half an hour. There are scholars who make veiled references to Hitler and Mussolini, claiming that de Mella represented a new type of charismatic public speaker compared to old-style 19th century leaders.

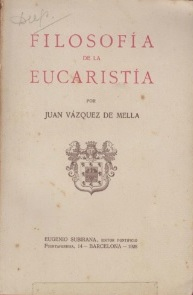
Filosofía de la Eucaristía

During his lifetime de Mella published mostly short pieces in various periodicals; apart from contributions signed with pen-names, especially in the 1880s, they were mostly editorials and essays to El Correo Español and El Pensamiento Español, though not only. Another category are booklets containing his addresses; probably no more than ten of them went to print. By the very end of his life the harangues delivered in the parliament were published in 2 volumes, titled Discursos Parlamentarios. Finally, shortly before death de Mella managed to complete and publish Filosofía de la Eucaristía, the only major book published in his lifetime and partially also a compilation of earlier writings. A huge number of pieces – press contributions, booklets, addresses and private papers – were published posthumously in the 31-volume Obras Completas series of the 1930s. Taken together they amount to massive opus; however, it is made of small – or at best mid-size writings, many of them circumstantial. As there is no in-depth, extensive and systematic treaty among them, a number of editors attempted sort of a synthesis by selecting pieces they deemed most representative and by combining them in topic-oriented sections; this is how de Mella's thought is usually absorbed.

== Reception and legacy ==
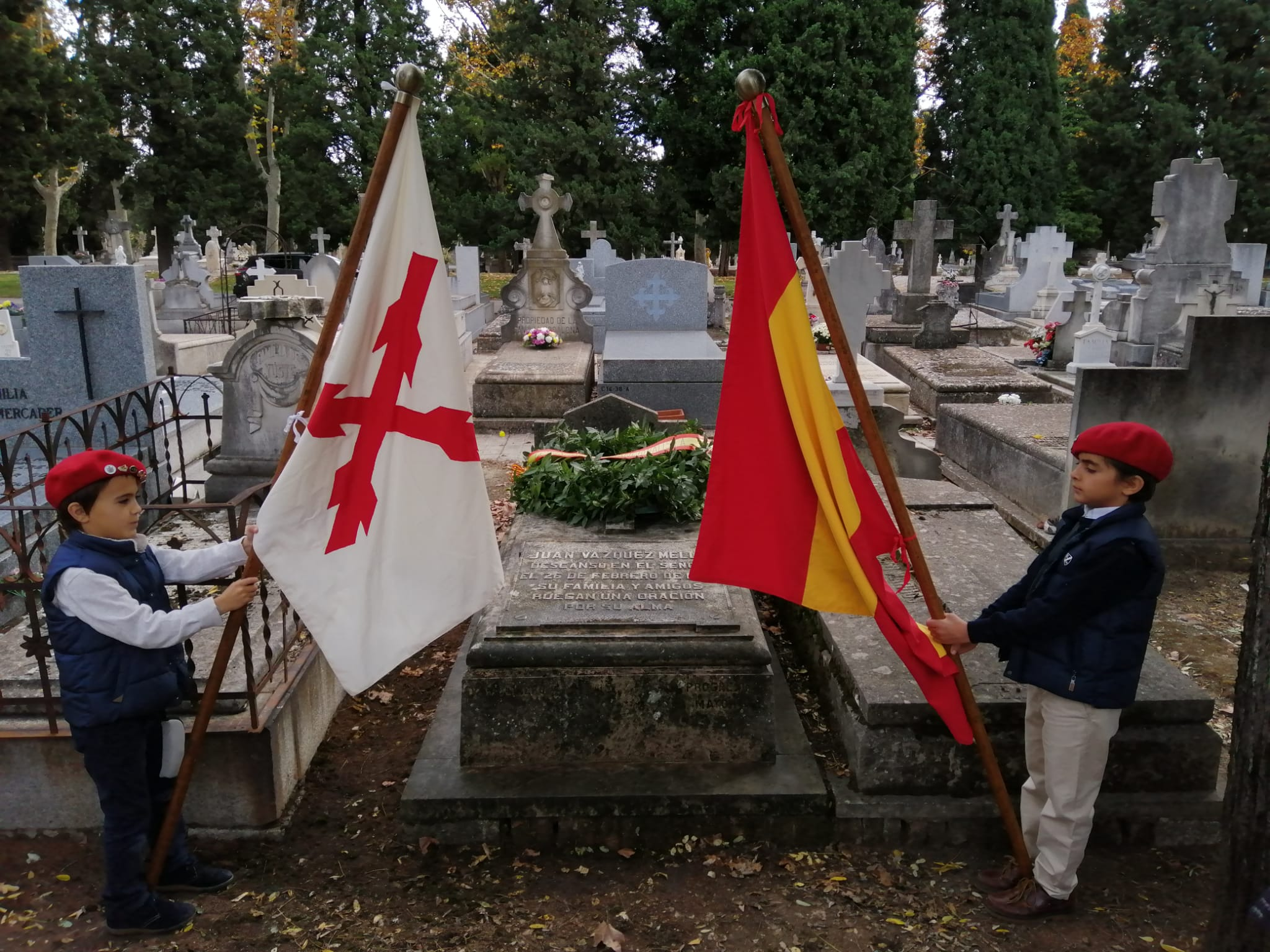
Carlist tribute before the tomb of Juan Vázquez de Mella, 2019

Since the early 1900s de Mella enjoyed a popular standing nationwide among Conservatives, he grew into an iconic figure among the Spanish Traditionalists, disregarded by the foreign ones. Among Republicans and Liberals he was ridiculed as an apostle of outdated, medieval ideas. When a retiree he featured in the press as a point of reference, many reviews publishing huge all-page photos following the news of his death. Former Mellistas ensured that soon afterwards a commemorating plaque was mounted in Madrid. In the early 1930s most faithful disciples edited a monumental series of de Mella's works. For the progressists he was already a ludicrously prehistoric voice from "ultratumba".

In 1946 a Madrid plaza was renamed to Plaza Vázquez de Mella, hosting also his modest monument. An informal Carlist Academia Vázquez de Mella existed in the 1940s, but de Mella enjoyed a revival in the mid-1950s; a new generation of Traditionalist thinkers, mostly Elías de Tejada and Gambra, made his thought a point of departure for their own works and elevated him to the status of an all-time Traditionalist great. In the 1960s the memory of de Mella became an object of competition between two increasingly hostile groupings within Carlism, the Traditionalists and the Progressists. The latter, posing as renovators of Carlism, tried to turn it into a Left-wing party and re-defined de Mella as a pre-socialist writer. Major scholarly and non-partisan works on de Mella started to appear in the 1980s; apart from minor studies, there were 5 published in Spain, the latest one completed in 2016.

Currently among scientists of Spanish political thought Vázquez de Mella is usually considered one of the most eminent theorists of Traditionalism of all time; some tend to give him precedence over most others, while some tend to view him as a follower. His Carlist credentials are admitted somewhat hesitantly. Internationally he did not gain recognition; most encyclopedic entries on Traditionalism fail to mention his name, though in specialist studies ranging from America to Eastern Europe he features prominently. In historiography perhaps the most controversial question is de Mella's impact on Francoism. Also, some scholars note that de Mella fuelled anti-semitism and count him among "theorists of extermination".

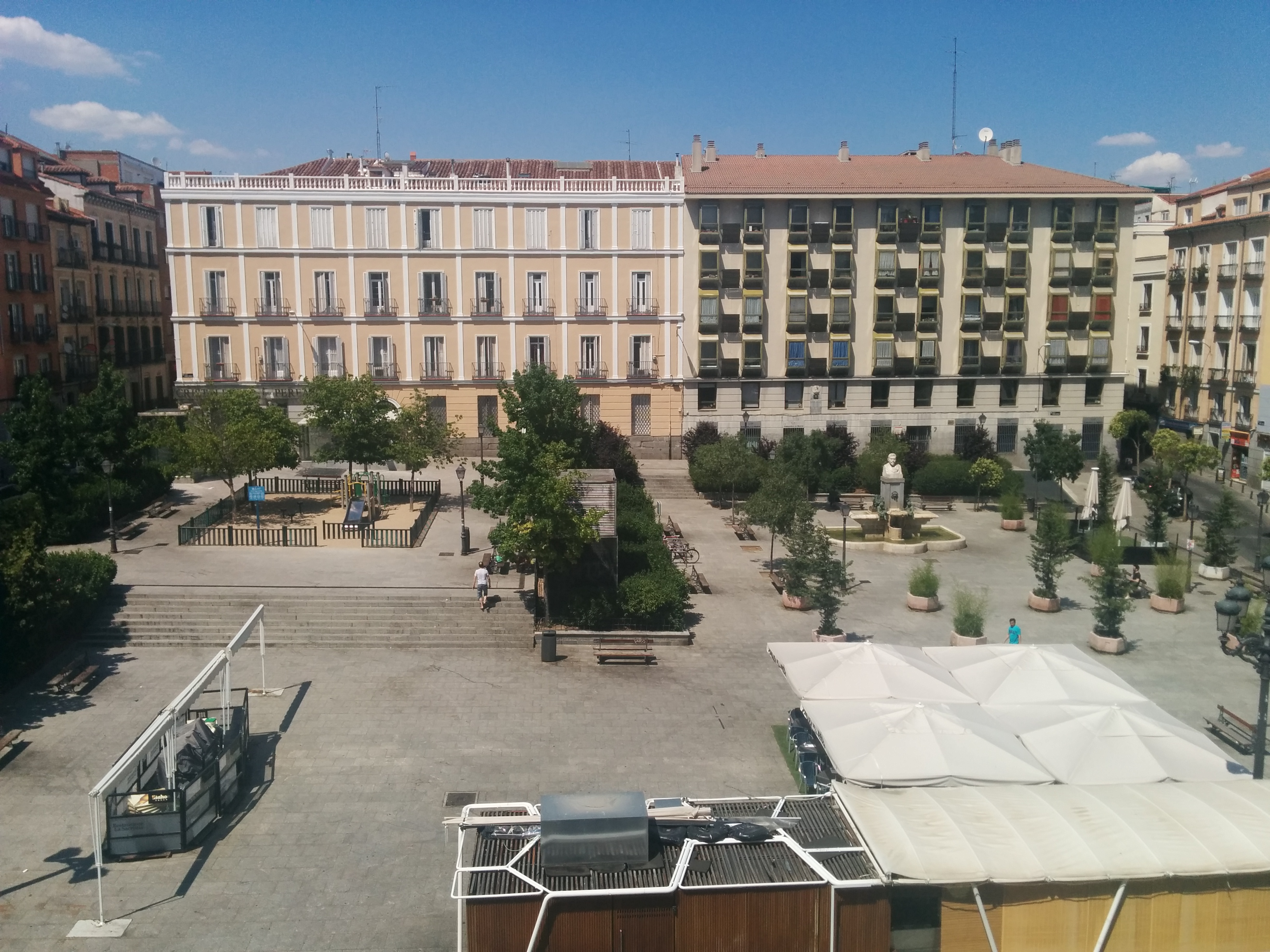
Former Plaza Vázquez de Mella, his monument visible right-back

In Spanish popular discourse de Mella is moderately present, usually referred to as a political theorist, at times denounced as co-responsible for reactionary, anti-democratic, shameful past. In 1994 there were calls to restore the plaque in his honor, mounted in 1928 and since then destroyed with the Paseo del Prado 14 house he lived in. In 2016 Plaza Vázquez de Mella was renamed to honor homosexual rights activist and PSOE councillor Pedro Zerolo; in the accompanying debate the insults of "Fascists", "Francoists" and "homophobes" were used to describe de Mella and his supporters. Initiators of the motion claimed they collected 84,000 electronic signatures in support. A number of cities in Spain still maintain street names honoring de Mella.

== See also ==
- Carlism
- Traditionalism (Spain)
- Mellismo
- Navarrese electoral Carlism during the Restoration
- Electoral Carlism (Restoration)
- Osvaldo Lira
