= Bernardo Elío y Elío =

Spanish aristocrat and politician

The Most Excellent The Marquess of las Hormazas GE
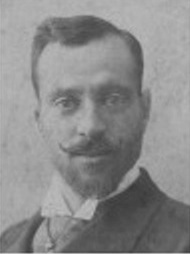
- Born: 1867; Pamplona, Spain
- Died: 1937 (aged 69–70); Bilbao, Spain
- Occupation: landowner
- Known for: politician
- Political party: Carlism

Bernardo Elío y Elío, 7th Marquess of Las Hormazas (1867–1937), was a Spanish aristocrat and politician. He supported the Carlist cause. During the late Restoration period he formed part of the regional Aragon party executive. He is known mostly as the local Traditionalist leader in the province of Gipuzkoa, especially during the lifetime of the Second Spanish Republic; he briefly served also in the supreme party executive without playing a major role in shaping the nationwide party politics. He was an inner-circle aristocrat ruling the local Traditionalist structures.

== Family and youth ==
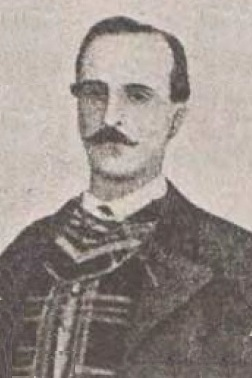
father

The Elíos, since the Mid-Ages related to Valle de Echauri, during the Modern Period became owners of many estates, scattered across central and Northern Navarre. Family representatives held various prestigious positions, for centuries served in the Cortes and were briefly care-takers of Virreinato de Navarra. By means of marriages they acquired Marquesado de Vesolla in the early 18th century and Marquesado de las Hormazas in the early 19th century. The holder of both titles and Bernardo's grandfather, Francisco Javier Elío Jiménez-Navarro (1800–1880), passed the Vesolla title to his oldest son, while the Las Hormazas title went to the second son and Bernardo's father, Joaquín Elío Mencos (1832–1876). The family was heavily related to other aristocratic Navarrese families, like Marquéses de Lealtad, Marquéses de Vadillo, Duqués de Bailén, Condes de Guenduláin and other.

Joaquín Elío married his cousin, Petra Celestina Elío Arteta (1836–1909), descendant to another Navarrese landholder family and already a widow. It is not clear whether the couple settled in Pamplona or at one of family estates; they had at least 3 children, Bernardo, Eduardo and Francisca Javiera. Following premature death of Joaquín Elío, result of his engagement in the Third Carlist War, in the late 1870s the widow and children settled in Zaragoza; the family Navarrese property was embargoed and possibly expropriated, while her well-off relatives lived in the Aragón capital. The young Bernardo was growing up in Zaragoza, though he has always cherished his Navarrese heritage. He studied law at the Zaragoza University and graduated probably in the late 1880s, though he has never practiced.

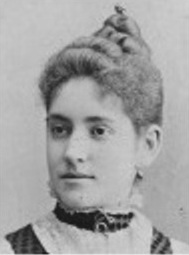
wife

In 1895 Elío married Teresa Zubizarreta Olavarría (1870–1936), descendant to a distinguished Gipuzkoan landowner family from Ataun in the Tolosa county. The couple settled in Zaragoza, though later they moved to Zubizarreta properties in Gipuzkoa; it is not clear how many children they had. The only one known was Bernardo Elío Zubizarreta, the 8. Marqúes de las Hormazas; marginally involved in Carlism in the early Francoist era, he did not become a public figure. Neither did any of the Elío Lopetedi grandchildren; following death of Bernardo Elío Lopetedi the 9. Marqués de las Hormazas in 2016 the title is vacant.

Numerous Elío's more distant relatives grew to prominence. Among his predecessors many from the Elío Ezpeleta, Elío y Elío and Zubizarreta branches distinguished themselves as legitimist military or officials, serving either in the First or/and Third Carlist War. His paternal uncle Alvaro Elío Mencos served as president of the Alava diputación in the late 19th century. Among his paternal cousins, Luis Elío Elío Magallón was a conservative Navarrese senator in 1907–1920; Francisco Javier González de Castejón Elío held various ministerial posts in conservative cabinets of 1900–1914; Miguel González de Castejón Elío was a military and preceptor of the future king Alfonso XIII, later made Conde de Aybar. His brother-in-law, Eusebio Zubizarreta, was a Carlist deputy to the Cortes in 1893–1896. Many other relatives intermarried with aristocratic families, usually related to the Vasco-Navarrese area.

== Early public activity ==
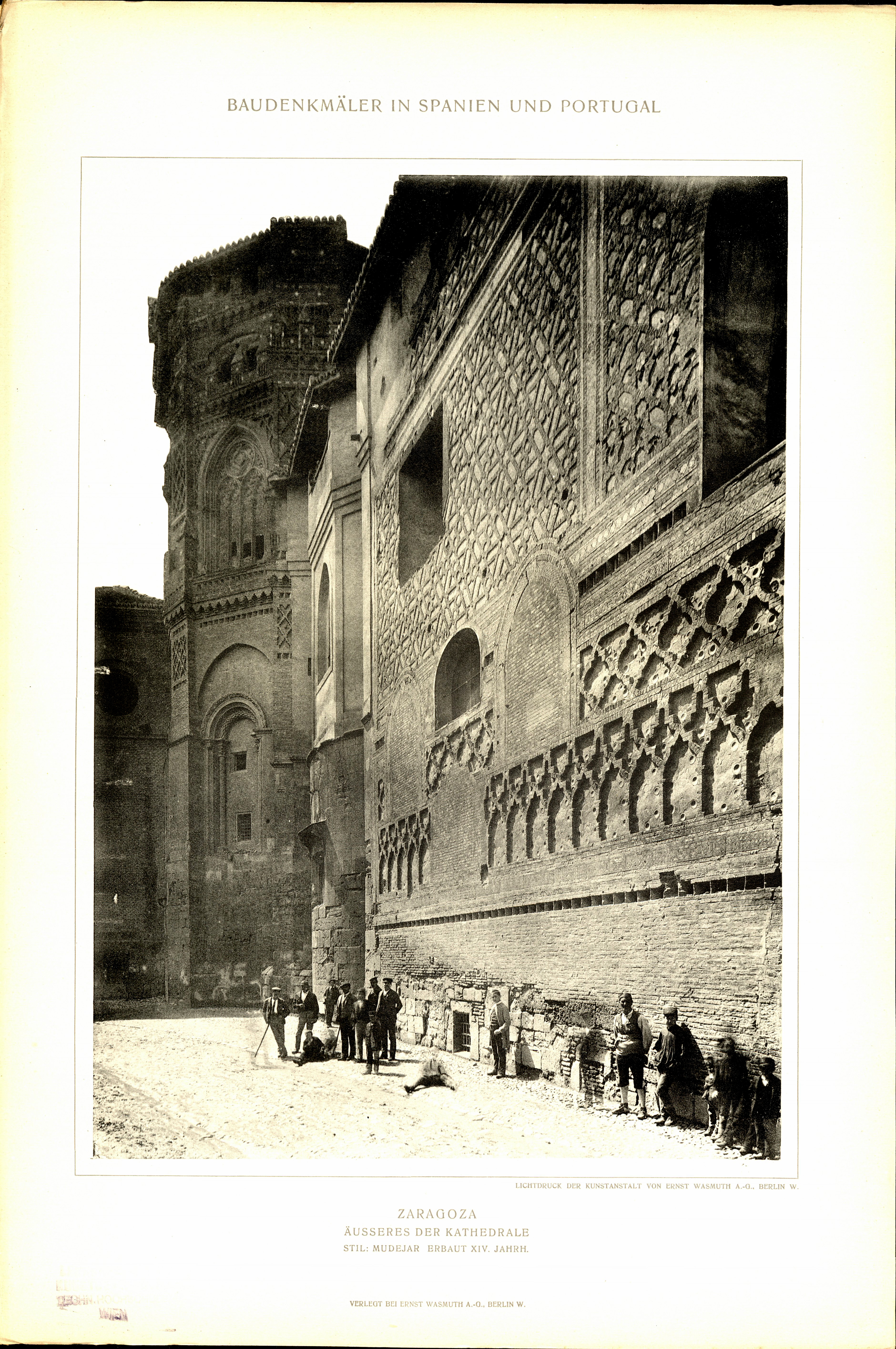
Zaragoza, late 19th c.

Many members of the Elío family sided with the Carlists since the 1830s, and a few like Joaquín Elío Ezpeleta grew to iconic figures of the movement. Bernardo's father Joaquín Elío Mencos prepared the Pamplona rising in 1869; captured and sentenced to death he was eventually condemned to exile on the Mariana Islands, but escaped in Cádiz and commanded a battalion during the Third Carlist War. Apprehended again few years later, he perished in captivity. Bernardo's father-in-law was the nephew of Tomas Zumalacárregui, a half-mythical Traditionalist hero, and engaged in the legitimist coup of 1860. Bernardo himself started to demonstrate his Carlist zeal already during the academic period in the mid-1880s, first signing letters protesting alleged mistreatment of the Pope and then – as member of Aragonese Carlist youth – manifesting his adherence to the claimant and his son Don Jaime. In 1890 he took part in Catholic Congress in Zaragoza and in 1891 embarked on a journey to Venice to pay his respect to the pretender.

As Elío remained among relatively few high aristocrats loyal to Carlos VII, he usually featured among first signatories of various open letters, circulated by the party activists. Since the early 1890s Elío started to appear along provincial prestigious Carlist personalities, e.g. in 1892 he co-presided a Traditionalist meeting in Zaragoza. During the honeymoon trip of 1895 he and his newly wed wife changed plans and detoured to Switzerland to meet the claimant and receive his best wishes. The same year Las Hormazas for the first time took part in a meeting of the nationwide Carlist executive in Madrid, headed by the party political leader Marqués de Cerralbo. In 1898 he was rumored to run on the Carlist ticket for the Cortes; newspapers speculated he would stand in the Navarrese district of Aoiz, but eventually the news was not confirmed.

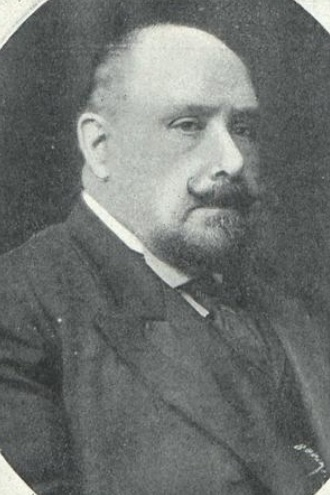
Solferino

In the early 20th century Elío was already a regular prestigious guest at various local Zaragoza and Aragón Carlist rallies. He was opening new círculos, featured prominently during party events like Fiesta de los Mártires de la Tradición, presided over rallies of the party youth, donated money to Traditionalist prints, co-signed various open letters and appeared in first row during related religious services; the claimant honored him with personal letters. In 1907 he became vice-president of Juventud Carlista de Zaragoza; at the same time he was also deputy chairman of Junta Tradicionalista of Zaragoza and probably also member of the Aragonese Junta Regional. Following the 1905 death of the unquestioned Aragón Carlist leader Francisco Cavero the regional party leadership was contested by Duque de Solferino, Manuel Serrano Franquini, Pascual Comín and José María del Campo; Elío and Francisco Cavero Esponera formed the second row of aspiring politicians.

== Aragón party executive ==
Carlist standard

In 1909 Elío for the first, and, as it would turn out in the future, also the last time, decided to stand in electoral competition. He represented the Carlists on a broad Right-wing ticket of Asociación Social Católica when running to the town hall from the Pilár district and emerged successful; the victory terminated the string of earlier Carlist electoral defeats. During the next few years he was recorded in local press as the ayuntamiento councilor, usually during charity events and other official ceremonies, e.g. meetings with local hierarchs, like civil governor of the Zaragoza province. His last assignment identified was the 1912 nomination to Junta Provincial de Instrucción Pública; indeed, he demonstrated particular interest in education, animating rallies against secular schools.

At least in 1909 Las Hormazas entered Junta Regional de Aragón; it is not clear whether at the time he was also member of the provincial Zaragoza party executive, though he held vice-presidency of Juventud Tradicionalista in the city. In the early 1910s he went on with usual and rather traditional party ceremonial duties, e.g. speaking at close meetings or taking part in related religious services. In his early 40s, since 1910 he presided over the freshly set up Zaragoza branch of Requeté, at the time the sporting and outdoor organization for the youth. In the regional executive he was also responsible for co-ordination of charity work. Elío is not mentioned as engaged in nationwide Carlist politics; historiographic works on Traditionalism of the early 20th century ignore him and it is not clear what – if any – was his position in numerous conflicts tormenting the party at the time, like mounting conflict between the claimant and the key theorist Vázquez de Mella, position versus growing peripheral nationalisms or the question of a broad conservative alliance.

Valde-Espina

Though resident in Zaragoza and active in the regional Aragón party structures, Las Hormazas maintained links to his native Vasco-Navarrese area; e.g. in 1909 he was noted in San Sebastián taking part in the funeral mass to the late Carlos VII. In the mid-1910s Elío focused on remnants of his Navarrese estates in Valle de Baztán, as construction of Tren Txikito, the Elizondo-Irún narrow-gauge railway line, affected his property related to the former Señorio de Bertiz. None of the sources consulted confirms when he left Zaragoza and settled in Gipuzkoa, most likely at the Zubizarreta property inherited by his wife in San Sebastián. In 1914 he was for the first time noted as engaged in the provincial Gipuzkoan Carlist structures, at that time led by Marqués de Valde-Espina. Also the last Zaragoza-based information related to the Elío couple comes from early 1914.

== Gipuzkoa party executive ==
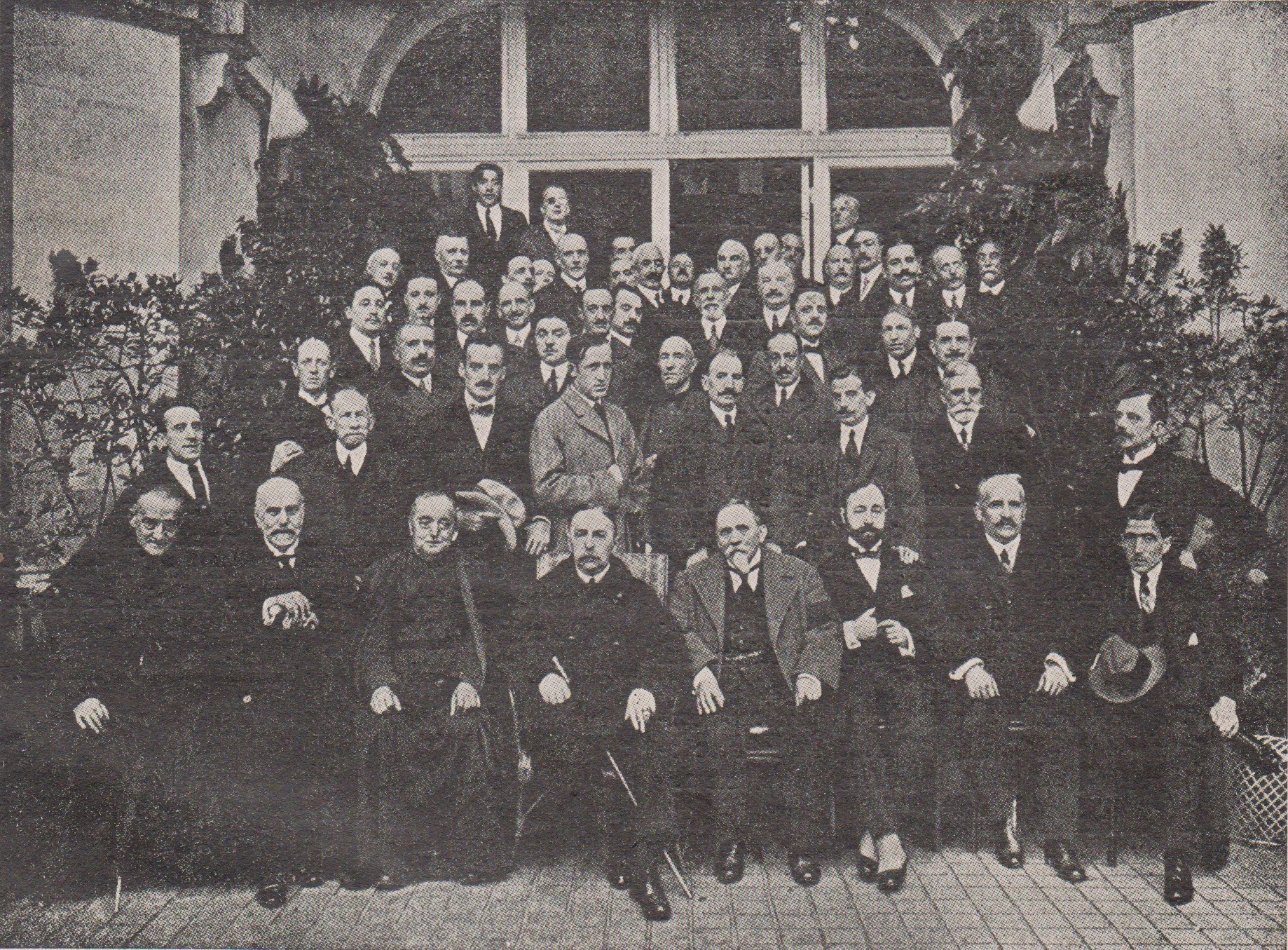
Magna Junta de Biarritz, 1919

During the Mellista crisis of 1919 Las Hormazas sided with the claimant. As representative of Gipuzkoa he was one of 4 aristocrats present during a grand meeting known as Magna Junta de Biarritz, supposed to set the new course of the movement. In the early 1920s he moderately engaged in Jaimista propaganda and purchased shares in Editorial Tradicionalista, a Donostía-based Carlist publishing house. However, the Primo de Rivera coup of 1923 brought political life in the country to the standstill; throughout the rest of the decade Elío was recorded in the press only on the societé columns, as he apparently withdrew into privacy.

Few weeks after the fall of Primo, in early 1930, the Gipuzkoan Jaimistas reconstituted their provincial executive; Las Hormazas was temporarily elected its president, the choice confirmed a few months later during a grand rally in Zumarraga. As provincial jefé in October he issued a manifesto which called to recognize distinct identity of the Vasco-Navarrese provinces, including the Basque language and separate legal establishments, all to be incorporated within “esta hermosa Federación de Naciones”. In 1931 he suggested setup of “Pro Reivindicaciones Vascas”, a junta expected to work for re-constitution of “nuestras libertades”; however, he opted against "organización supraprovincial”.

In 1930-1931 Elío emerged strongly in favor or re-unification of all Traditionalist branches, initially on basis of a Catholic alliance. When in late 1931 the process was completed with emergence of united Comunión Tradicionalista he saw his powers somewhat diminished; though he remained the provincial jefé of CT, in public it seemed that he co-presided with the former Integrist leader, Juan Olazabal, as the two appeared as peers on many assemblies, especially at the 1931 funeral services to the defunct Don Jaime. Though he was confirmed as Gipuzkoan jefe in 1932, the double-leadership pattern was maintained as both Elío and Olazabal entered the national party executive.

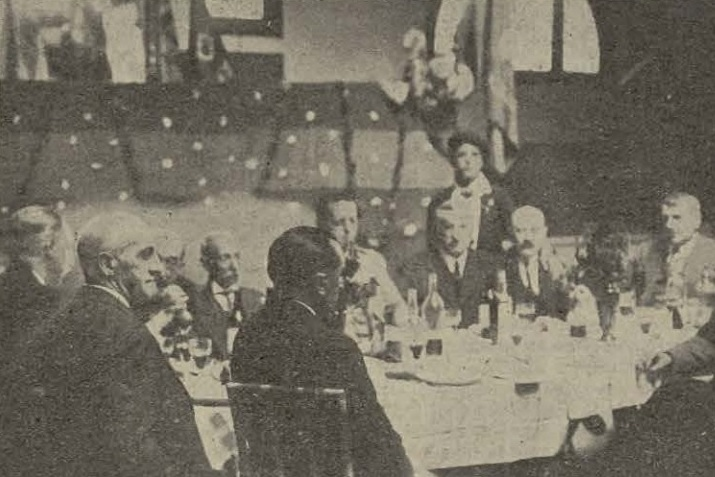
Elio at a Carlist banquet in Azcoita, 1930s

During early stages of debates on Vasco-Navarrese autonomy Elío remained active and called to abolish the government-imposed comisiones gestoras, but in his 1932 addresses he was more ambiguous; historiographic studies do not list him as involved. Still member of the national executive in the mid-1930s, in 1933 he was first noted as suffering from poor health and got temporarily replaced. In 1934-1935 he was noted on few rallies and entertained the new party leader Manuel Fal in the province, though at key gatherings he seemed in the second row.

It is not known whether Elío was involved in anti-Republican conspiracy of 1936. In Gipuzkoa the coup failed; Las Hormazas was detained and ended up in the Bilbao Angeles Custodios prison. Since the Basque government did not deploy autonomous police to protect the building during the unrest, caused by the nationalist bombing raid over the city, the prison was entrusted to the UGT militia unit. On January 4 socialist militiamen executed around 100 prisoners; some were killed by hand grenades thrown into cells, some were shot and some were reportedly slashed with machetes. It is not clear how exactly Elío died.

== Footnotes ==
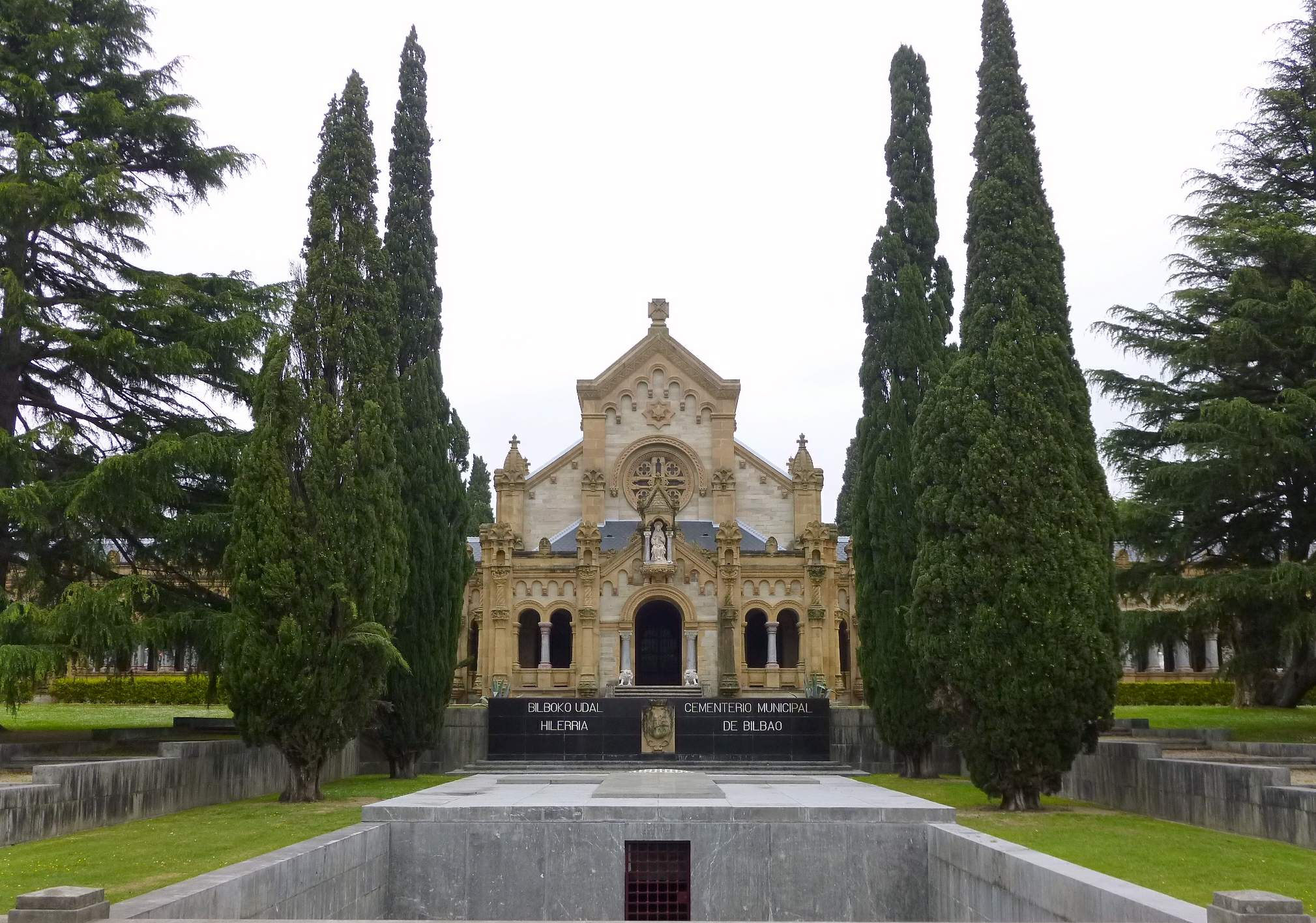
Bilbao, Derio cemetery. In front the entry to the crypt with remnants of 4.1.37 victims, now unmarked, closed, in total decay and unattended
