= Pascual Comín Moya =

Spanish Carlist politician

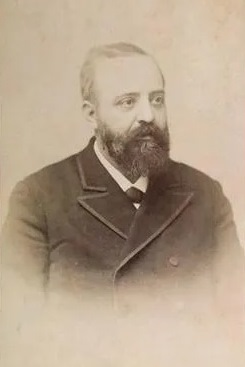
- Born: Pascual Comín Moya; 1855; Zaragoza, Spain
- Died: 1928 (aged 72–73); Zaragoza, Spain
- Occupation: lawyer
- Known for: politician
- Political party: Carlism

Pascual Comín Moya, 2nd marquess of Comín (1855–1928) was a Spanish Carlist politician. Since the mid-1890s he formed part of the provincial Zaragoza party executive and the Traditionalist regional Aragón leadership; since 1907 he was the party leader in the region of Aragón. His political climax fell on 1919, when during 6 months between mid-February and mid-August he held the provisional Carlist party jefatura nationwide. Until today his leadership period remains the shortest one in the entire Carlist history.

== Family and youth ==
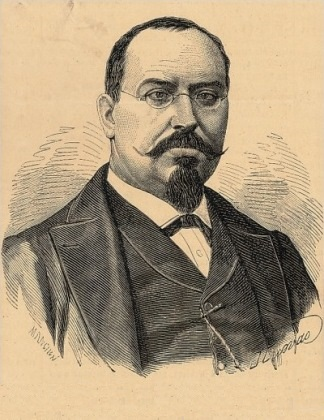
Bienvenido Comín

Origins of the Comín family are obscure. One branch settled in Aragón, but until mid-19th century none of its representatives gained public recognition. Pascual's paternal grandfather sided with the legitimists during the First Carlist War; following defeat he settled in Bordeaux. This is where his son and the father of Pascual, Bienvenido Comín Sarté (1828-1880), spent his late childhood. In 1842 he returned to Spain and studied law; in 1848 he started to practice in Zaragoza. In the mid-1850s Comín Sarté engaged in Carlist conspiracy himself; following the Aragonese rebellion of 1855 he went on exile again. Back in Spain he gained local recognition as “el abogado de los pobres” and served in the Zaragoza ayuntamiento. In the late 1860s he became president of Junta Provincial Católico-Monárquica, emerged as key Carlist theorist and laid out the legal claim of Carlos VII; the pretender rewarded him with the title of Marqués de Comín. Exiled again during the Third Carlist War, in the late 1870s he was among most distinguished Carlist intellectuals of the era and one of the best-known lawyers in Aragón.

Bienvenido Comín married Luciana Moya Huerto (died 1896); none of the sources consulted provides any information either on her or on her family. The couple had 3 children: Pascual (born 1855), Francisco Javier (1857) and María Comín y Moya (1862), all brought up in very religious and zealously Traditionalist ambience. It is not clear where the young Pascual received his early education. He then enrolled in Facultad de Derecho at the University of Zaragoza; exact years of his academic career are not known, though they fell probably on the early 1870s. Comín Moya obtained the licenciatura in law in Zaragoza, to pursue his doctoral research at Universidad Central in Madrid later on; the year of his doctorado is not clear. In the late 1870s he was back in Zaragoza, where he soon opened his own law office.

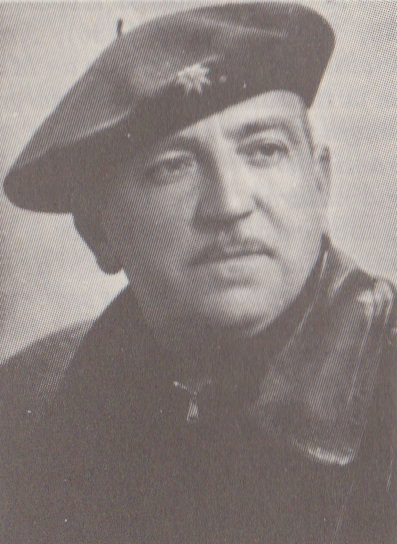
Jesús Comín

At unspecified time Pascual Comín Moya married María de Arévalo y Aguilar; there is no information on her or her family available. It is neither clear whether the couple had any children. When referred in societé columns of the press, e.g. in the 1890s, they are listed along nephews and other relatives, but never with own children; also later notes on Comín's family engagements do not contain information on his children. Comín's obituaries and death notices, which customarily contained condolences addressed to descendants, did not mention any. Marquesado de Comín, which Pascual inherited from his father, passed on to his younger brother. A few of Comín's relatives grew to public figures. Pascual's younger brother Francisco Javier became an academic and served as dean of the law faculty in Zaragoza; his son and Pascual's nephew Jesús Comín y Sagüés emerged as Carlist politician and served in the Republican Cortes. The son of Jesús Alfonso Carlos Comín Ros gained name as a writer and politician who tried to merge Communism and Catholicism, while his son Antoni Comín Oliveres is a Catalanist separatist politician.

== Earlier public activity (prior to 1907) ==
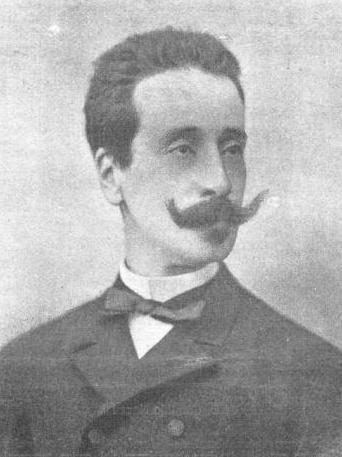
Ramon Nocedal

As descendant to two generations of Carlists and as son to one of the greatest Traditionalist theorists of the time, Comín inherited his political outlook from the ancestors. Already as a 10-year-old boy he was listed in various open letters which supported the Catholic cause; in his teens he delivered addresses during local gatherings and while at the university he engaged in the religious charity organisation Asociación San Luis Gonzaga. His whereabouts during the Third Carlist War are not clear. In the late 1870s and early 1880s his name kept appearing among signatories of various declarations of support or protest letters, usually related to religious questions and perceived anti-Catholic measures of the Madrid government. In the early 1880s Comín acted as president of Juventud Católica de Zaragoza and used to deliver militant addresses at its meetings.

Comín's focus on religious issues seemed perfectly in line with the strategy adopted by the Carlist political leader, Candido Nocedal; Comín travelled to Madrid to take part in related events. Following death of Nocedal, in the mid-1880s Comín seemed supportive of his son Ramón Nocedal, who aspired to vacated party leadership. However, upon outbreak of the conflict between Nocedal and the claimant Carlos VII Comín sided with his king and did not join the Integrists, who broke away in 1888. In the early 1890s Comín was active in quasi-political activities animated by the Church, which at the time turned towards wider public mobilization: he took part in Congreso Católico de Zaragoza and formed part of a commission appointed by the archbishop, entrusted with screening local periodicals and propagating Catholic virtues in the press. In 1893 latest he entered Junta Provincial Carlista de Zaragoza, the provincial party executive; in 1895 he was reported as member of Junta Regional, the body which commanded Carlist structures in entire Aragón.

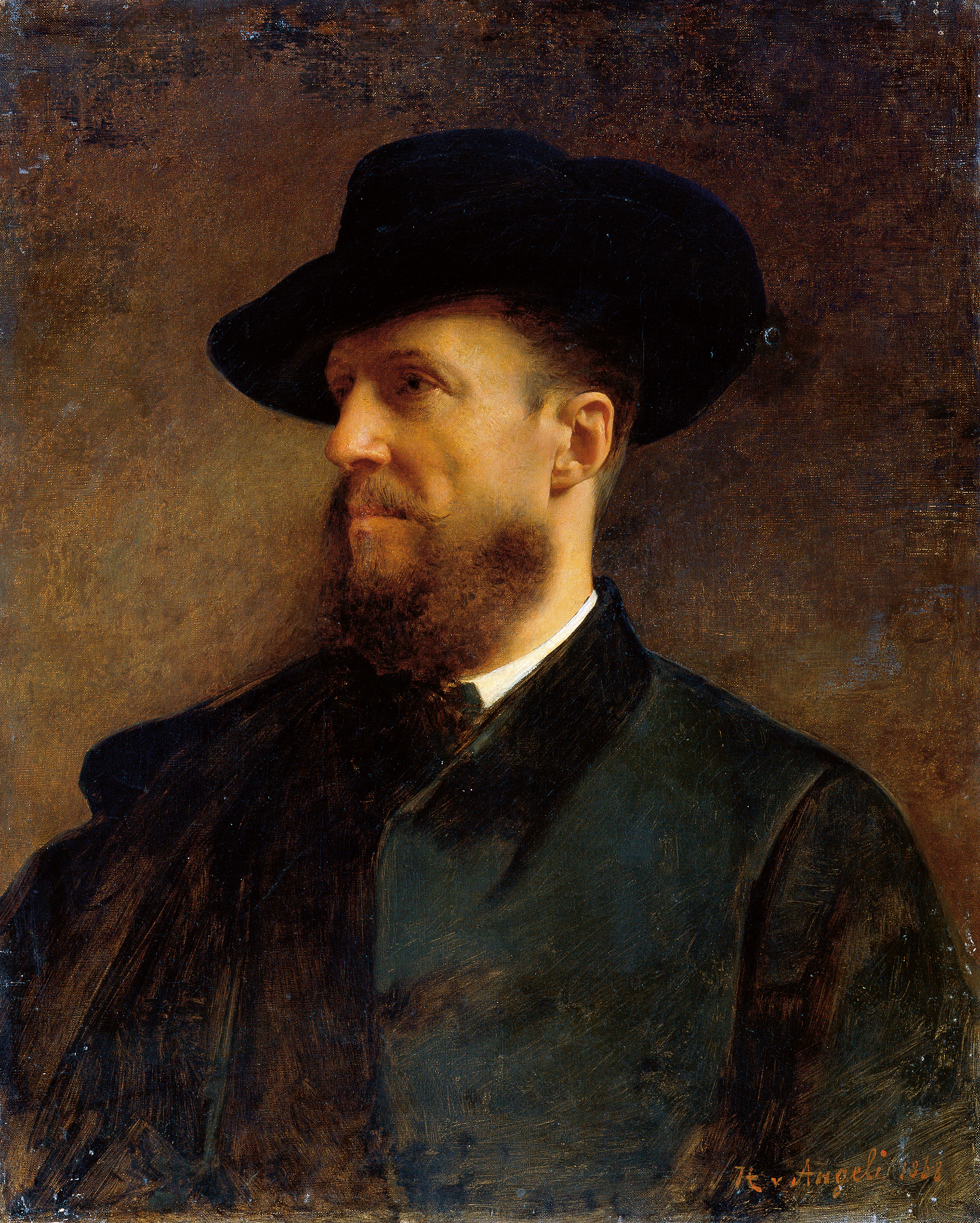
Carlos VII

At the turn of the centuries Comín was already a recognized Zaragoza personality. He formed part of executive of the local charity organisations La Protectora, remained active in anti-duel association and took part in numerous in one-off events, e.g. the one intended to prevent tuberculosis. A recognized specialist in local heritage law, he was delivering lectures at congresses of Aragón lawyers. A royal decree which created a nationwide Comisión General de Codificación nominated him to sub-commission entrusted with work on specific legal Aragón establishments. He served as counselor in the ayuntamiento, member of Audiencia Provincial and fiscal de la cámara de apelaciones, specializing in criminal law. He handled prestigious legal cases and represented local personalities in civil lawsuits. His career in jurisprudence was crowned when in 1907 Comín grew to dean of the Zaragoza Colegio de Abogados.

== From regional to national leader (1907-1919) ==
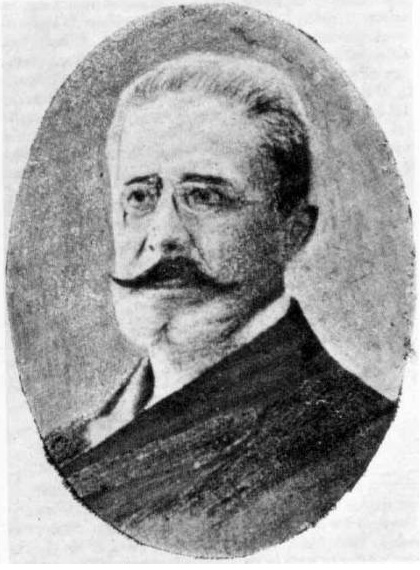
Bartolome Feliu

Since the 1870s the Aragón party leader was the military old-timer Francisco Cavero; however, in the 1890s he was already withdrawing into senility. The regional jefatura went to the young Duque de Solferino; as he moved to Catalonia the role was then handed to the veteran landowner Manuel Serrano Franquini. Following his death in 1906 the position was vacant; among candidates to take over there was José María del Campo, Cavero's son Francisco and the young Marqués de las Hormazas. None of them, however, compared to Comín in terms of prestige and professional position; in 1907 he was appointed the new Aragon jefe regional.

Much of Comín's party activity was routine administrative and propaganda work. He was present at openings of new círculos, handed standards to existing units, greeted the party leader Feliú or infanta Beatriz in Zaragoza, headed meetings and rallies, launched a party periodical El Pensamiento Aragonés, signed various open letters or issued electoral recommendations. Since pre-war times Aragón have failed to elect a Carlist candidate to the Cortes; Comín tried to revert the trend when running from Tarazona in 1910, but he failed; this was his only bid for the parliament. In 1912 he had to deal with discipline problems and disauthorised a group named “Lealtad Jaimista”; details of the conflict are not clear. The same year he first met his new king Don Jaime in person as he travelled to Saint Jean de Luz. Also in 1912 he was nominated to Junta Superior Central, a newly created 15-member national Carlist executive. Since then he started travelling to Madrid; in 1913 Comín was nominated to a sub-section named comisión de defensa jurídica. Some sources claim he ceased as regional jefe in 1914. Comín is credited for efficient organizational work and contribution to development of Carlist network in Aragón.

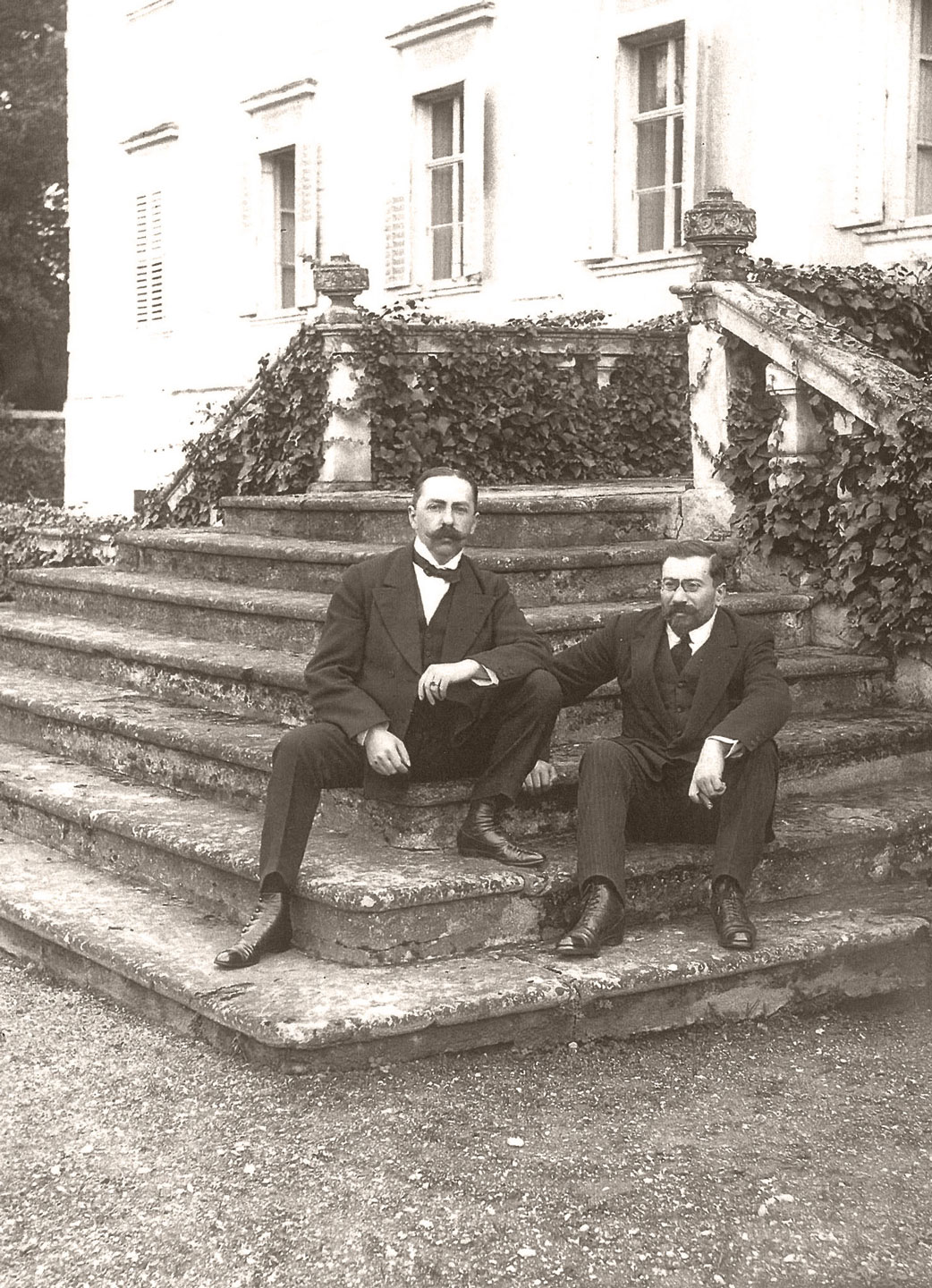
Don Jaime and de Mella

In the mid-1910s Carlism was divided between followers of the theorist Juan Vázquez de Mella and the claimant; the former advocated a grand ultra-right alliance, the latter demanded loyalty based on own monarchic claim. Moreover, the Mellistas sympathized with Central Powers, the claimant tended to favor the Entente, while the party political leader Marqués de Cerralbo, aging and tired, was unable to take a firm stand. Comín remained a resolute Germanophile, but he did not encourage the Mellista campaign and maintained loyalty to the claimant, himself incommunicado in sort of a house arrest in Austria. When the First World War ended in early 1919 Don Jaime travelled to Paris; he immediately dismissed all leadership including Cerralbo's interim successor, Cesareo Sanz Escartín. De Mella left to build his own organisations and numerous top leaders joined him. As the party command layer was decimated by defections and many older tycoons seemed bewildered, there were few to choose from when looking for a new leader. Though Comín was not particularly active in nationwide party executive, in mid-February 1919 Don Jaime appointed him secretario general, a de facto political Carlist leader in Spain; Comín accepted the nomination given it was a temporary stopgap measure.

== Secretario General (Feb-Aug 1919) ==
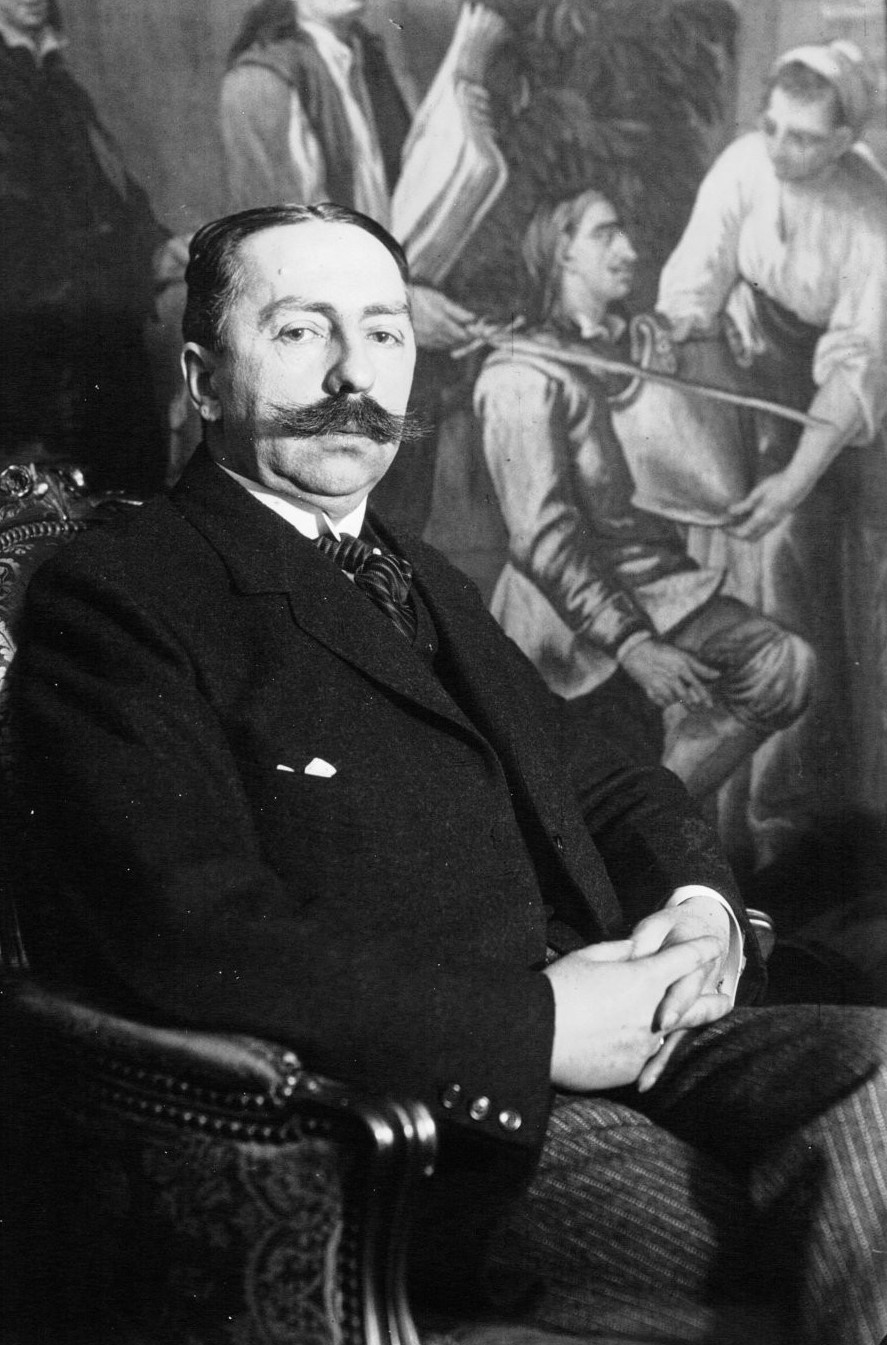
Don Jaime, 1910s

Shortly following nomination Comín travelled to France to discuss the way forward with the claimant. In early March he was back in Spain and proceeded to sort out most urgent personal matters; he ceded the Aragón leadership to a collegial makeshift body, set up a new Catalan jefatura and tried to re-organize command layer in other regions. Following few months of conciliatory tactics, in May 1919 Comín dissolved all regional juntas and dismissed all leaders who held their posts prior to February. However, only in few cases he managed to appoint the new ones; the wave of defections to the Mellista camp decimated high- and mid-range leaders. He did not tolerate fence-sitters; also in May Comín disauthorised another theorist and intellectual, Víctor Pradera, who until then maintained an ambiguous stand. One more thread was fight for the party infrastructure and preventing its takeover by the rebels. It proved victorious, as the Jaimistas retained control over 3 key newspapers, El Correo Español, El Pensamiento Navarro and El Correo Catalan; the rebels were forced to build their press mouthpiece from scratch.

On the external propaganda front Comín downplayed the impact of the Mellista secession. In public he presented the breakup not as a clash of different concepts and strategies, but merely as a result of disciplinary action taken against some dissenting militants. In wake of rising Catalanism he underlined the regionalist profile of Carlism. He also presented the movement as the party of order, which stabilized political life and prevented social radicalism. Referring to increasing chaos and lawlessness he pointed to republican Lerrouxism and violent Anarchism as to responsible forces, and once again offered Carlism as the only force capable of confronting revolution and disorder. The first major test of these maneuvers was the general election of June; Comín did not stand and limited himself to general co-ordination. The campaign turned disastrous; while in 1918 the Jaimistas got 9 MPs, in 1919 they managed to have only 3 candidates elected; the breakaway Mellistas also elected 3 candidates.

Carlist standard

In the summer of 1919 Comín, apart from his routine professional engagements and work for the Zaragoza ayuntamiento, shuttled across Spain not only to Madrid but also to other regional capitals; moreover, he visited the claimant in France. Comín's relations with his king were turning sour; Comín detested the claimant's personal secretary, Francisco Melgar, whom he charged with numerous intrigues and promotion of the Francophile group of activists. One of them was supposedly Melchor Ferrer, appointed by the claimant as the new manager of the unofficial Carlist press mouthpiece, El Correo Español. Comín requested written confirmation of the nomination and remained highly skeptical about the “afrancesado” Ferrer; possibly together with some Navarrese he tried to block his nomination. Eventually when speaking to Don Jaime he pointed to his own age, declared himself unable to remain during long spells in Madrid and resigned; in mid-August 1919 the resignation was accepted and made public.

== Late public engagements (1919-1928) ==
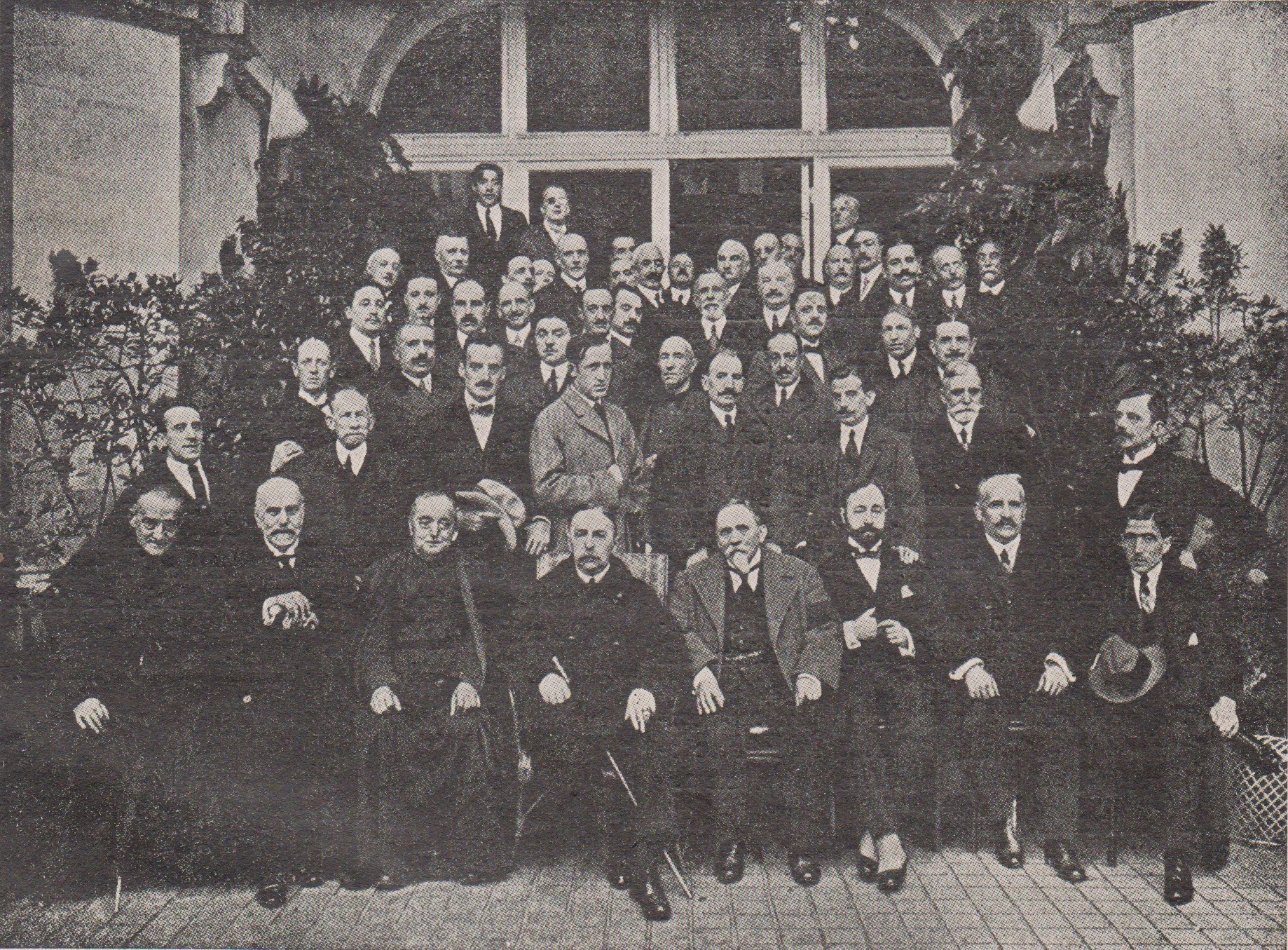
Magna Junta de Biarritz, 1919

Following resignation Comín did not withdraw into the second row and remained moderately active in the Carlist command layer. His engagements were very much directed against Melgar, whom Don Jaime initially envisioned as the party political leader. Before resignation Comín recommended that his successor as secretario general be Luis Hernando de Larramendi, also a Germanophile and the politician he earlier co-operated with during numerous social initiatives in Zaragoza. Eventually the claimant agreed to appoint Larramendi, but Comín went on with his anti-Melgar crusade. The campaign proved successful and Melgar did not take part in a grand Jaimista meeting dubbed Magna Junta de Biarritz, staged in November 1919; it is not clear whether he was not invited or aware that spirits against him were running high, he withdrew. Comín himself telegraphed his adhesion, but did not participate; the meeting was supposed to set the direction of the new, post-Mellista Carlism.

In early 1920 Comín grew even more skeptical about Don Jaime and the perceived Francophile intriguers in his entourage, reportedly still led by Melgar. He and a group of Basque-Navarrese leaders, including Hormazas, Joaquín Beunza, Tomás Domínguez Arévalo and Julian Elorza Aizpuru, addressed the claimant with a letter. They declared utter loyalty to the cause and to Don Jaime; nevertheless, in ultimative tone they demanded that “funesta y perjudicial” influence of Melgar and his men be reduced, with specific references to management of El Correo Español. The signatories hinted that otherwise, they would be forced to “reduciéndonos a rendir culto a nuestros principios en la intimidad de nuestros hogares”. As their positive recipé to prevent marginalization of the party they demanded setup of a party collective executive, which would consist of representatives of every region. There was no reply and in mid-February the letter was made public; Comín and some other signatories resigned their posts.

After 1920 there is no information on any Comín's engagements in the Carlist ranks and it seems that he indeed “cultivated Traditionalist principles in the privacy of his home”. He went on with his professional juridical duties, either representing clients in private lawsuits or acting as assessor for the Zaragoza ayuntamiento; he might have performed some roles in the city council itself. In 1923 he was noted as representing the University during a local act, though his exact relation to the Zaragoza alma mater has not been established and he is not known to have ever undertaken a teaching role. None of the sources consulted confirms Comín's public activity during the Primo de Rivera dictatorship. His death was acknowledged in merely a handful of newspapers, including few national ones; he was noted as notable Aragón lawyer and former Carlist executive, though some obituaries confused Comín with his brother Francisco Javier.

== See also ==
- Traditionalism
- Carlism
- Jesus Comin Sagues
