= Francisco Martín Melgar y Rodríguez =

Spanish Carlist politician (1849–1926)

Francisco de Asis Melgar Rodríguez Carmona
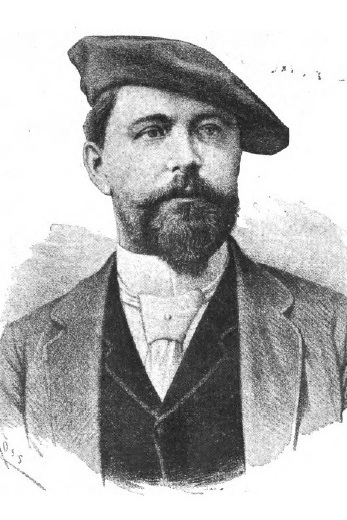
- Born: Francisco Melgar Rodríguez; 31 August 1849; Madrid, Spanish Empire
- Died: 3 March 1926 (aged 76); Paris, France
- Occupation: journalist
- Known for: politician, author
- Political party: Carlist

Francisco de Asís Martín Melgar y Rodríguez Carmona, 1. Count of Melgar del Rey (31 August 1849 – 3 March 1926), was a Spanish Carlist politician. He is known as political secretary of the Carlist king Carlos VII and one of the late 19th century party leaders. He is also noted as author of memoirs, which together with his massive personal archive are an invaluable source on Carlist history of the era.

== Family and youth ==
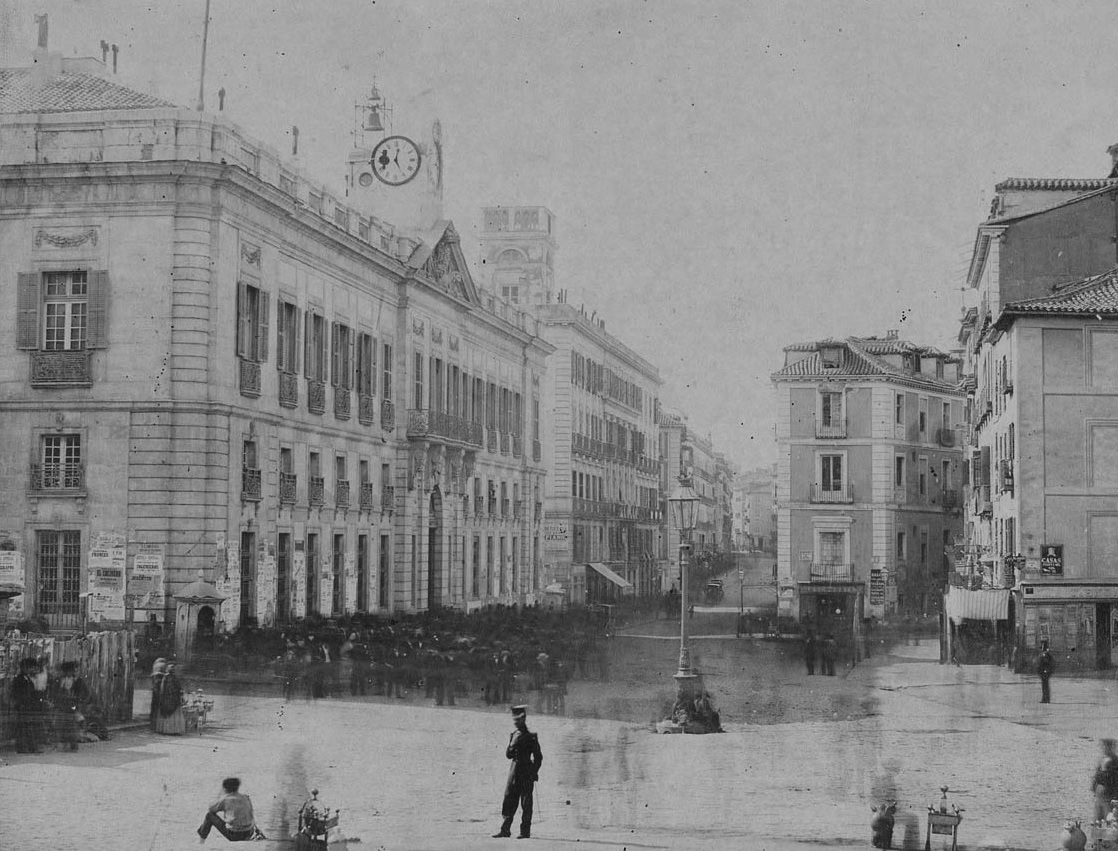
Madrid, 1857

The Melgar family originated from Aragon. Francisco's paternal grandfather, Jorge Martín, left his native Zaragoza and settled in Madrid. His son and Francisco's father, Manuel Martín Melgar (1806-1883), already as a young man grew to low-range administrative positions at the court; in 1827 he was nominated fiscal in Real Academia de Teologia and in 1831 he became Bibliotecario de Cámara of Francisco de Paula, the youngest brother of Fernando VII. He remained loyal to Infante Francisco during the First Carlist War, in the 1840s passing to entourage of his vehemently liberal son, Infante Enrique. In 1848 confirmed as royal secretary, during década moderada he broke with the court following political disagreements. He dedicated himself to law career and acted as representative of local Madrid Catholic establishments, retaining the honorary title of secretario primero del gobierno. Over time Manuel Melgar assumed an increasingly conservative stand; in the 1860s he approached the neocatólicos, together with them nearing the Carlists later on. In 1870 he became vice-president of the Madrid Junta Provincial Católico-Monarquica, a Carlist-dominated grouping.

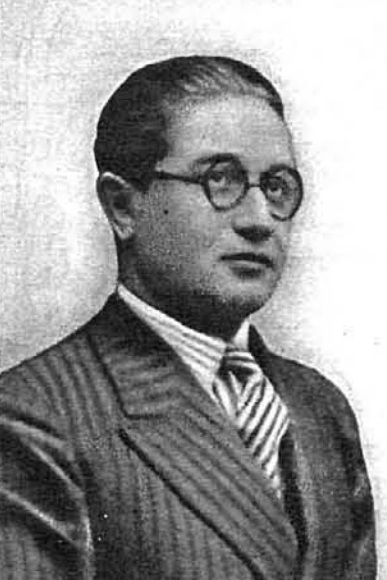
Francisco Melgar Trampus

Manuel Melgar was married three times; his second wife was María del Carmen Rodriguez Carmona. It is not clear how many children the couple had: different sources suggest there might have been three of five siblings. Francisco was born as the second oldest son, all raised in fervently Catholic ambience. None of the sources consulted provides information where he received his childhood and early teen education. In 1864 he entered Universidad Central and pursued a double curriculum, studying both at Facultad de Filosofia y Letras and at Facultad de Derecho. During his academic years he was exposed mostly to Liberal thought of his professors, like Castelar, Montero, Salmerón and Moret, though he forged friendship with conservatively minded students like Enrique de Aguilera, the future marqués de Cerralbo. He graduated in 1868 in both law and letters.

Family life of Francisco Melgar remains rather obscure; neither he in his memoirs nor any of the scholars offers any meaningful insight into his personal matters. Next to nothing is known about his wife, Jeanne Trampus, born probably in Trieste and married in Paris in 1906. According to Melgar she was mentally ill and developed maniac behavior; She deceased before her husband; their daughter, Carmen Melgar Trampus (1907-1990), became a nun. Their son, Francisco Carlos Melgar Trampus, as a youngster serving as secretary to the Carlist claimant Don Jaime, engaged in Madrid Carlist structures of the 1920s; in the 1930s he was the Paris correspondent of Estampa and As, in the 1940s active in the Francoist press; in the 1950s he acknowledged Don Juan as legitimate Carlist heir and entered his Consejo Privado. Author of a few books on Carlism, in the 1960s he wrote as a columnist to ABC. His son, Jaime Melgar Botassi, worked as translator. Currently the condado rests with Francisco's great-grandson, Francisco Melgar y Gómez de Olea Botassi y Naveda.

== Early Carlist engagements ==
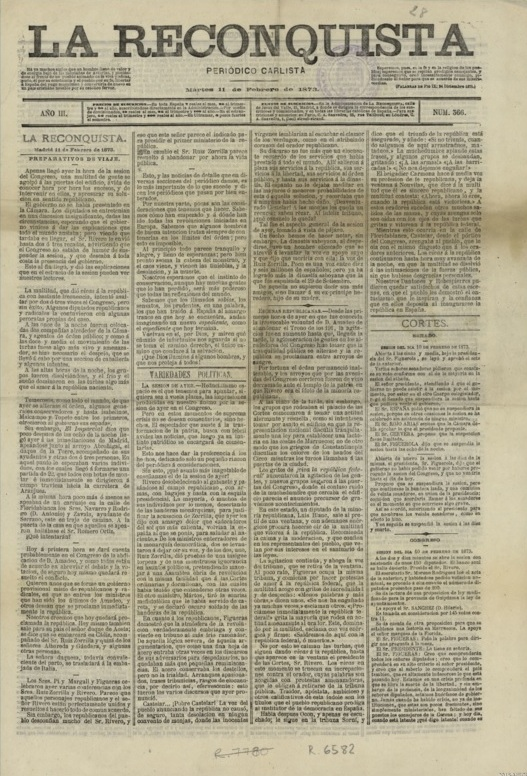
La Reconquista

Inheriting late conservative outlook of his father, Melgar engaged in a number of initiatives confronting secular tide of the 1868 Glorious Revolution. In 1869 he was among founders of La Armonia, a cultural society promoting Catholic orthodoxy as the backbone of public education. The same year he co-founded Juventud Católica and become treasurer of its Junta Superior, apart from engaging in other confessional bodies. He mixed with neocatólicos, tended to side with Nocedal in controversies with the Carlist claimant Carlos VII and by some scholars is considered a neo himself, but in his later years Melgar spoke about the Neo-Catholics with disregard if not sheer contempt.

In the late 1860s Melgar, from his youth demonstrating impressive ease of writing, commenced co-operation with a number of Madrid right-wing periodicals and befriended Traditionalist pundits of the era, like Francisco Navarro Villoslada, Antonio Juan de Vildósola and Candido Nocedal; with Antonio Aparisi Guijarro he was even distantly related. Formally member of the editorial board of El Pensamiento Español, in 1871 he became key staff member of La Reconquista. Upon the 1872 outbreak of the Third Carlist War Melgar became editor-in-chief of the paper; increasingly endangered by Republican hit-squads dubbed "partido de la porra", he went into hiding. In 1873 he took part in gathering of Carlist press leaders in Bordeaux, where Melgar met the claimant for the first time. Having returned to Madrid he went on editing La Reconquista until it became impossible, in 1874 leaving by sea for the Carlist zone.

Carlos VII entrusted Melgar with setting up an official Carlist bulletin, which materialized in Tolosa as El Cuartel Real. Managed, edited if not mostly written by Melgar, it kept appearing until few days before the city fell to the Alfonsist troops in 1875. He later joined 2. Gipuzkoan Battalion. His older brother was mortally wounded in action, but it is not clear whether Francisco took part in combat; according to some sources he fought in last battles of the war. He then survived mutiny of the unit and in February 1876 crossed the Pyrenees into France, breaking his rifle upon leaving the country.

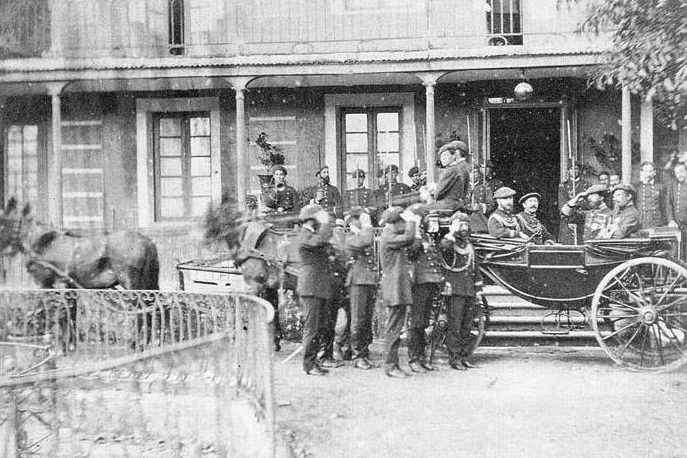
Carlos VII in his HQ, Tolosa

Melgar's father due to his support lent to the Carlists was expropriated and chased by the security; he settled on exile in Sant-Jean-de-Luz, but Francisco did not join him. Also wanted by the Madrid government, he decided to live in Paris. Resuming journalist career he became the press correspondent; apart from foreign periodicals, under pen-names he contributed also to the Spanish ones. According to himself, he declined the offer by Pidal and Moret, who first invited him to assume the job of director of Biblioteca Nacional and then suggested he become first secretary of the Spanish embassy in Paris. When Carlos VII returned from his international voyages and settled in Paris late 1877, the two resumed contact. As the claimant's political secretary, Emilio Arjona y Laínez, was getting increasingly unpopular among the Carlists, Melgar started to act as his provisional replacement.

== Political secretary: service to Carlos VII ==
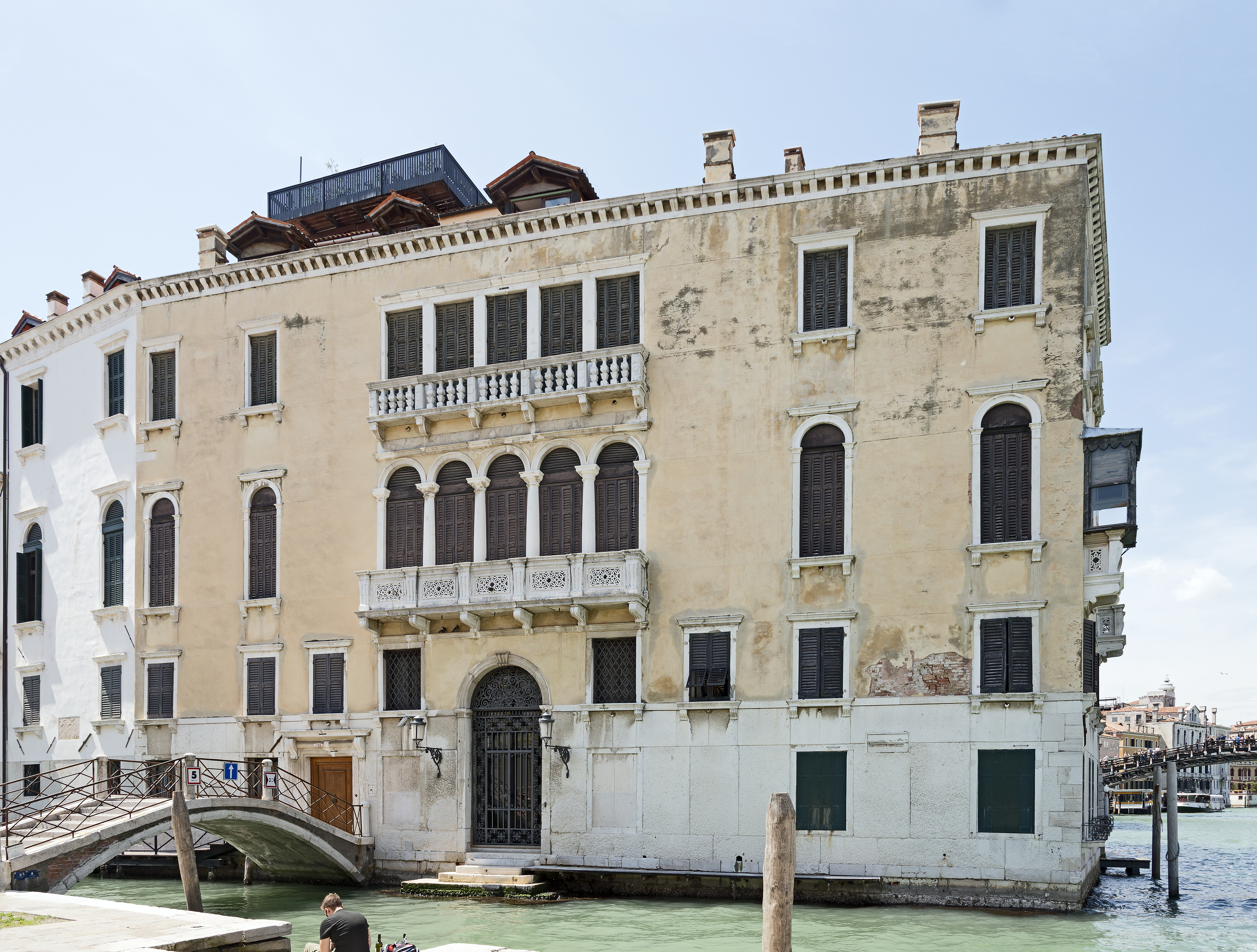
Palazzo Loredan

In 1880 the French authorities expulsed Carlos VII. Asked by the claimant to become his official secretary, Melgar agreed. The two men settled in Venice in the building known as Palazzo Loredan; while Don Carlos and his family occupied the upper floor, Melgar lived on the lower level. Except that Melgar maintained duly respectful position towards his king, the two remained on cordial terms; when travelling, they even shared the same servant. Don Carlos appreciated Melgar's service and in 1888 conferred upon him condado de Melgar del Rey, recognized by the Madrid government in 1956. Though in the late 1890s the relationship deteriorated, it remained friendly until the very end; Carlos VII used to address his subject as "Melgarito". The job was fully paid; apart from having his daily expenses covered, Melgar was receiving a monthly salary.

The key Melgar's task was to run massive correspondence of the claimant. He also accompanied the king in voyages across Europe and the world, and participated in political gatherings. Granted significant autonomy, after the Integrist breakup in 1888 Melgar became key link in the party command chain, described as Carlos VII – Melgar – Cerralbo. Exact scale of his impact on party politics is not clear. Though Carlos VII sought his advice on many issues, it is unlikely that Melgar exercised major influence on the charismatic Carlist king; students underline rather his genuine devotion to the monarch. It is because of the autonomy he enjoyed that some refer to him as one of key Carlist leaders of the late 19th century, member of the inner-circle ruling the movement.

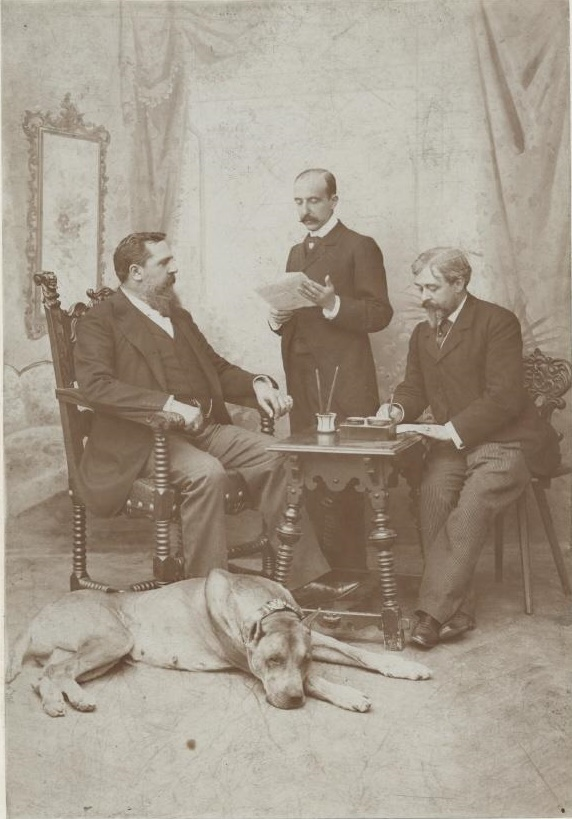
with Carlos VII and Cerralbo, 1890s

When discussing Melgar's term as political secretary historians usually present him as a "cerralbista", supporter of non-belligerent, moderate, aperturista policy of his old-time friend de Cerralbo. This stand was demonstrated in the 1880s, during growing conflict with the Nocedals, and in the 1890s, during Carlist attempts to re-enter official political life in Spain. Melgar is hardly presented as a theorist; he is rather portrayed as an intriguer, a person who thrived plotting Machiavellian personal schemes; apart from minor personal decisions, some suggest he might have unfairly contributed to the 1888 Integrist secession and note that he was involved in beginnings of the conflict with Juan Vázquez de Mella.

Melgar's position started to change in 1894; he found himself in acute personal conflict with the newly wed second wife of Carlos VII, Berthe de Rohan. Relations between the king and his secretary worsened in unclear circumstances during Carlist military buildup of 1898–1900. Though Melgar was probably aware of belligerent preparations taking place beyond party structures he did not push for insurgency. Its uncontrolled outbreak in October 1900 caught Carlist leaders by surprise. The claimant, outraged and suspicious, decided to purge the party executive, with both Cerralbo and Melgar falling victims. According to himself, he was sacked as a result of joint intrigue of general Moore and Berthe de Rohan. Some scholars suggest that Carlos VII considered him traitor, but Melgar underlined cordial farewell he received in November 1900.

== Unofficial secretary: service to Jaime III ==
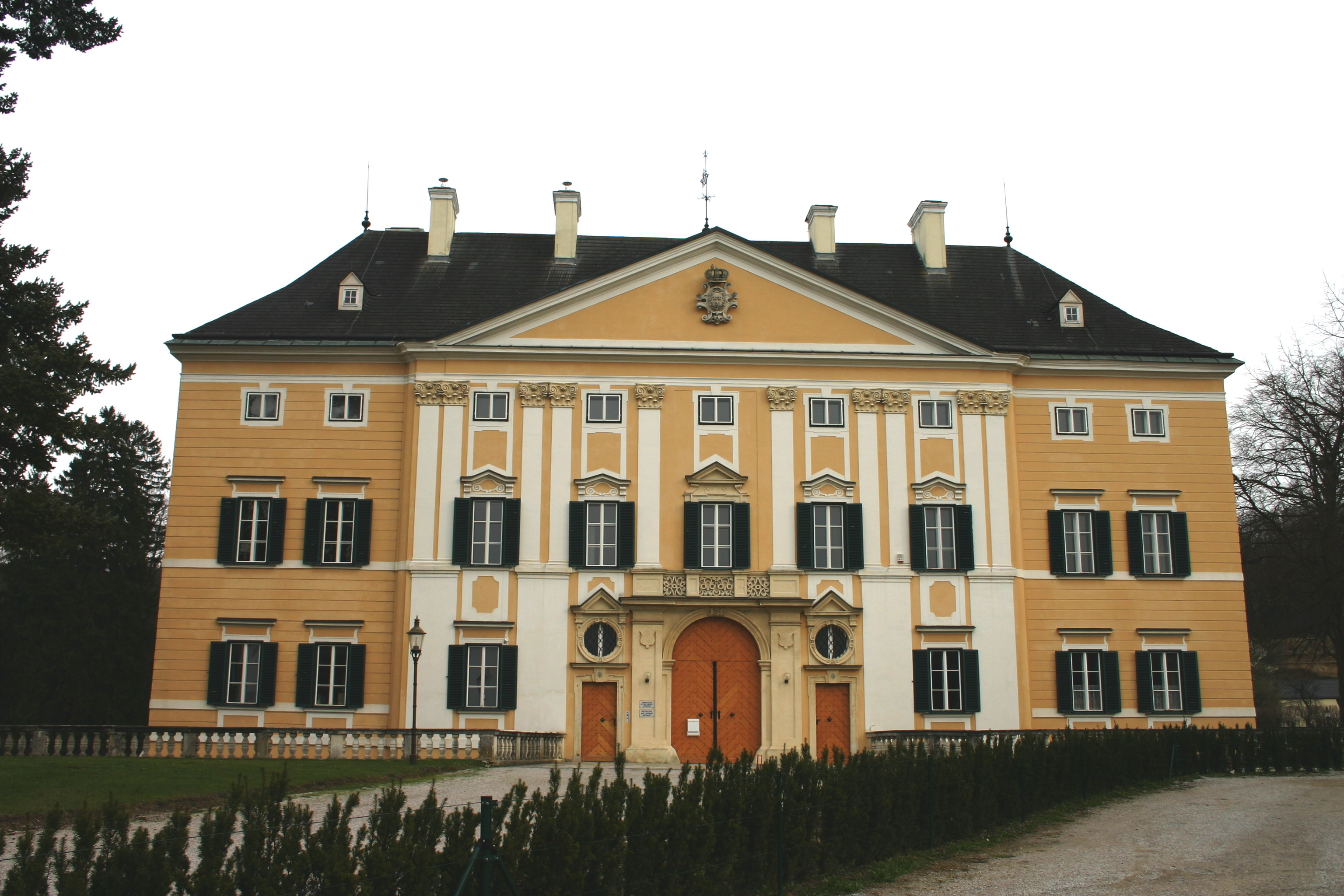
Schloss Frohsdorf

Having promised on departure that during his king's lifetime he would neither settle in Spain nor re-enter politics, Melgar returned to Paris and resumed his never entirely abandoned career of a press correspondent; he also maintained private links with some Carlist politicians. His fortunes changed in 1909, when Carlos VII died and the Carlist claim to the throne was assumed by his son, Jaime III. The new king since his early childhood was used to constant Melgar's presence. Also during his adolescence the relations between the two were very good; the prince appreciated that when in love with Mathilde of Bavaria, Melgar supported the marriage plans, eventually cancelled by opposition of his father and especially stepmother. In 1910, Melgar was invited to Don Jaime's residence in Frohsdorf, where during a few months of stay their relationship was refreshed and enlivened; apparently Melgar helped Don Jaime to sort out paperwork, partially inherited from his late father and partially related to his own ascendance to the throne.

From that moment Melgar resumed duties of political secretary and partially advisor to the Carlist king, to some degree again acting in-between the monarch and Carlist politicians in Spain. However, format of the service was somewhat different compared to the 1880-1900 period. It was carried out on de facto rather than formal basis, it was periodical and occasional rather than systematic and until 1919 it was performed remotely, though when Don Jaime settled in Paris, the two resumed close direct personal links. Another key difference was that unlike his father, Jaime III used to go into long periods of inactivity, which permitted Melgar to exercise more personal influence on party politics. On the other hand, similarly to the first spell of Melgar's activity also the second one was marked by intrigues and personal schemes.

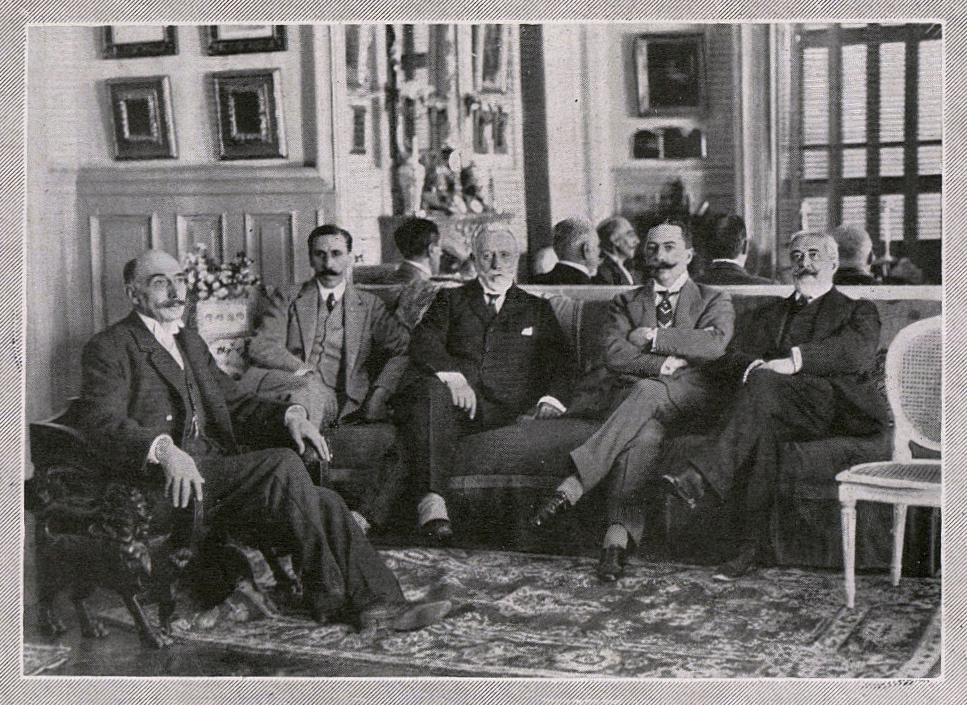
with Jaime III and others, 1910s

Carlist politics of the 1910s developed mostly as a conflict between the key party theorist, Juan Vázquez de Mella, and the claimant. Already in the 1890s highly skeptical of de Mella, since 1910 Melgar was waging a secret guerilla war against him. A carefully crafted plot intended to compromise de Mella backfired and in 1912 the Mellistas were reinstated in the Carlist Spanish executive; at that time de Cerralbo, increasingly under the influence of de Mella, was already approached by Melgar with well camouflaged hostility. Around the same time Melgar was also engaged in unclear maneuvers which by some scholars are interpreted as vaguely testing a possibility of enforcing Don Jaime's abdication in favor of his uncle, which would probably leave the party in hands of Cerralbo and Melgar. He went on confronting the Mellistas; posing as Cerralbo's friend he provoked his 1913 resignation. In the same document Cerralbo suggested that Melgar replaces him as royal representative in Spain, but the question proved pointless as the resignation was not accepted by the king.

== Political climax and demise ==
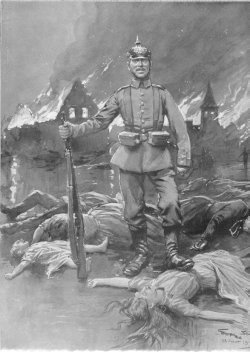
anti-German propaganda

During the First World War Melgar emerged as leader of minoritarian aliadófilo faction within Carlism; apart from having been a longtime French resident, he also witnessed dynastically motivated ice-cold relations between Carlos VII and Franz Joseph, developing particular enmity towards the Austrian kaiser and the Central Powers. Some scholars suggest that already upon the outbreak of hostilities in the summer of 1914 Melgar's advice cost Don Jaime dearly. Personally sympathizing with the Entente but officially pursuing a neutral path, when asked by the Austrians for vague declaration of loyalty Don Jaime remained adamant, which led to his house arrest in Frohsdorf. This was probably not intended by Melgar, though as a result the claimant remained hardly contactable during the next 4 years of warfare, in turn leaving Melgar almost free to deal with the party executive back in Spain.

When confronting the pro-German Mellistas Melgar resolved to provocations but mostly embarked on massive Gallophile propaganda. His pamphlets, designed either for Spanish or foreign audience, advanced all sort of arguments against the Central Powers, lambasting their Carlist supporters as "carlo-luteranos", and mocking their slogan as "Dios, Patria, Alemania". In 1916 he considered setting up a pro-French daily in Madrid and possibly appeared in Spain himself. He might have misled de Cerralbo as to actual position of the claimant. In 1917-1918 he was increasingly ostracized among the Carlists. When in early 1919 Don Jaime managed to leave Austria and arrived in Paris, his first step was consulting Melgar before he released a manifesto – allegedly written by Melgar – which announced forthcoming personal measures against those deemed disloyal. De Mella and his followers intended to show up in the French capital and present their case but were denied visas, a Machiavellian intrigue also attributed to Melgar. The Mellistas, who already considered Don Jaime "a toy of Melgar", gave up and decided to break away, setting up their own party; Cerralbo resigned.

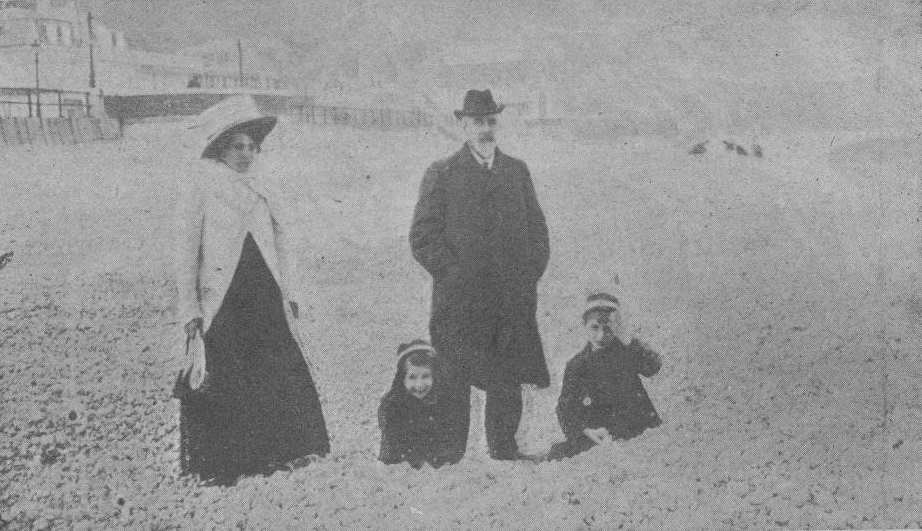
Melgar with his family, 1912

Following the breakup Melgar focused on purging the party newspaper from the Mellistas; as he remained a lone player and did not build his own political background, the term "Melgaristas" was scarcely in circulation. When the new provisional party leader Pascual Comín was to be replaced in the summer of 1919, Don Jaime asked Melgar to become his representative in Spain, but the 70-year-old refused, probably conscious that in the party feelings against him were running high. As demands to get rid of Melgar reached the claimant he realized this as well; Melgar was not invited to take part in Magna Junta de Biarritz, a grand Carlist assembly entrusted with working out the Carlist course into the future. Starting 1920 he is no longer mentioned as acting in-between the claimant and the party leadership, though some sources claim that until the mid-1920s he served as secretary and counselor to his king, in 1923 replaced by own son. Since 1914 Melgar suffered from limited financial resources; according to one source he spent his last years in poverty.

== Author and publisher ==
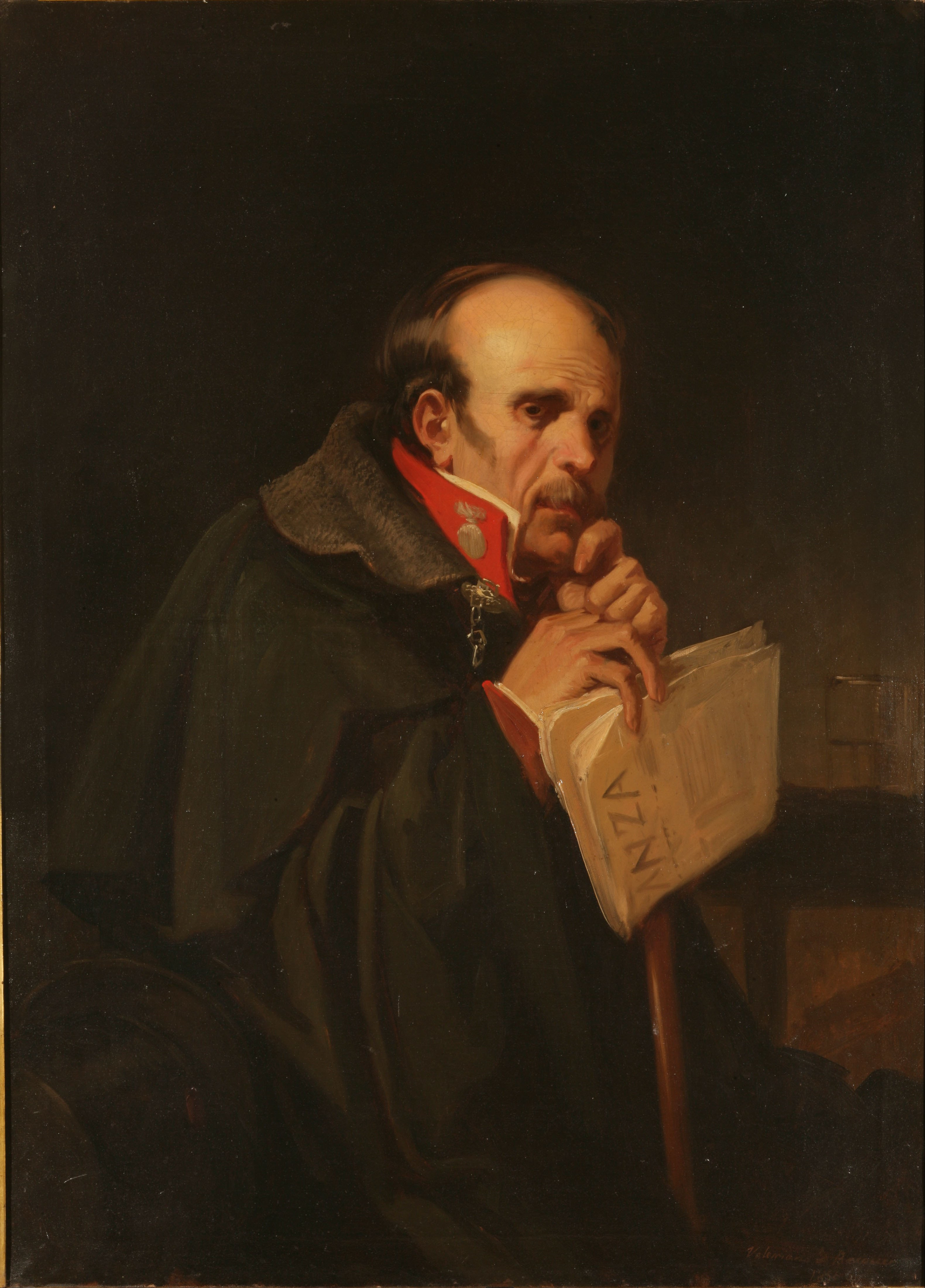
El carlista de La Esperanza by Bécquer

Brought up in the family of a librarian, already during his juvenile years Melgar demonstrated a knack for letters. In the late 1860s he won laurels in poetry: selected by authors like Aureliano Fernández-Guerra y Orbe and Manuel Tamayo y Baus, he was awarded literary prize for his poem dedicated to the First Vatican Council. In the press and almanacs of the era he sporadically published poems, grandiose in style and revolving around religious topics, though he also translated works of religious French authors like Enrique Lasserre. In the 1870s he was known as "poeta y periodista Melgar", like in case of the 1873 reference of Alejandro Pidal.

In the early 1870s he focused on typical press work, contributing to El Pensamiento Español, La Esperanza, La Convicción, Altar y Trono and La Ciudad de Dios. Most items identified seem to be minor editorial pieces, though it is not clear if and what pen-names Melgar might have used, especially when running La Reconquista. In the late 1870s as "Franco de Sena" he kept supplying correspondence from Paris to La Illustración Católica, El Siglo Futuro and the Santiago de Chile based El Estandarte Católico, covering the Spanish issues for the French L'Univers and L'Chiven. In the 1880s and 1890s as "Marcos Laguna" or "Monsieur le Comte" he contributed to El Correo Español and El Estandarte Real, later writing also to La Hormiga de Oro. Until death he remained the correspondent of La Epoca.

Melgar's works which stirred most controversy are his pro-Entente pamphlets from 1916 to 1917, mostly En desgravio, La mentira anónima and La gran víctima. Written with partisan zeal and propagating all sorts of calumnies against the Central Powers, they turned many Carlists against Melgar, though it is not clear how many Spaniards they won for the cause of the Allies. They were certainly noted abroad; the British New Statesman acknowledged them as "amazing pamphlets". Today they are considered "classic example of the surrender of objectivity" and virulent propaganda.

Carlist standard

Melgar is best known as author of memoirs; written in the mid-1920s and titled Veinte años con Don Carlos, they were published by his son in Madrid in 1940. The 220-page book covered only the years when Melgar served as political secretary of Carlos VII; lively narrated it is singularly uninformative as to details of his work, though it projects all personal preferences and dislikes of the author. Aversion towards theoretical and ideological debates combined with abundant gossip and picturesque anecdotes make it excellent read; some historians warn that it must not be approached as literally accurate and even suspect manipulation, others generally consider it a fairly reliable source. Another book published by Melgar Trampus in 1932, Don Jaime el principe caballero, most likely is co-work of the father and the son; it appeared under ambiguous name of "Francisco Melgar", attributable to both. In historiography Melgar is most appreciated for his massive private archive, which in absence of destroyed private papers of Carlos VII provides excellent insight into the Carlist history of the era.

== See also ==
- Carlism
- Carlos VII
- Jaime III
- Mellismo
