= Las Hormazas =

- Municipality
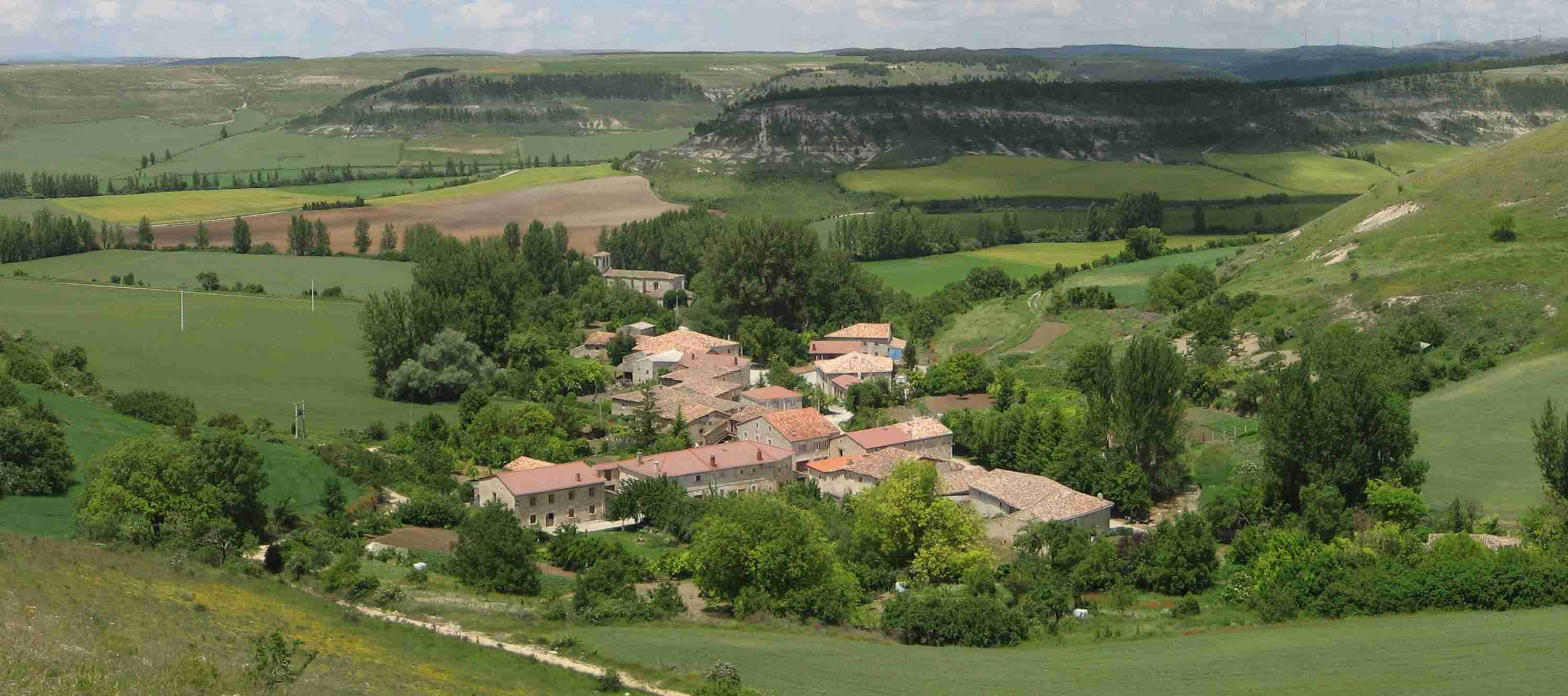
- View of Borcos, one of the separated quarters of Las Hormazas

- Coat of arms
- Interactive map of Las Hormazas
- Coordinates: 42.5150°N 3.8961°W
- Country: Spain
- Autonomous community: Castile and León
- Province: Burgos
- Comarca: Odra-Pisuerga
- Seat: La Parte

Area
  - Total: 36 km^{2} (14 sq mi)
- Elevation: 905 m (2,969 ft)

Population (2025-01-01)
  - Total: 93
  - Density: 2.6/km^{2} (6.7/sq mi)
- Time zone: UTC+1 (CET)
  - Summer (DST): UTC+2 (CEST)
- Postal code: 09133
- Website: http://www.lashormazas.es/

Las Hormazas is a municipality located in the province of Burgos, Castile and León, Spain. According to the 2004 census (INE), the municipality has a population of 134 inhabitants. The seat is in the La Parte quarter.
