= Manuel de Llanza y Pignatelli =

Spanish Carlist politician

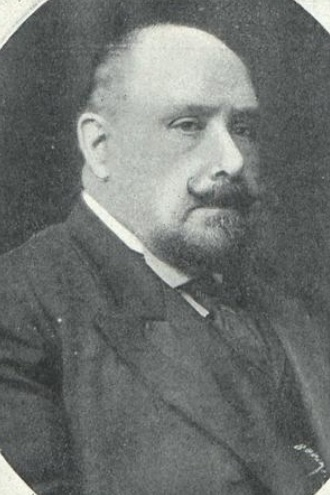
- Born: Manuel de Llanza y Pignatelli; 1858; Barcelona
- Died: 1927 (aged 68–69); Barcelona
- Occupation: Landowner
- Known for: politician
- Political party: Carlism

Manuel de Llanza y de Pignatelli de Aragón, Hurtado de Mendoza y Esquivel, 9th Duke of Solferino, 11th Marquis of Coscojuela, 13th Count of Centelles, grandee of Spain (1858–1927) was a Spanish Carlist politician. In the late 19th century he emerged as one of party leaders in Catalonia and was its regional jefe in two separate strings of 1910–1914 and 1917–1919. He is recognized as typical example of inner-circle aristocrat ruling the party during the Restoration period.

== Family and youth ==
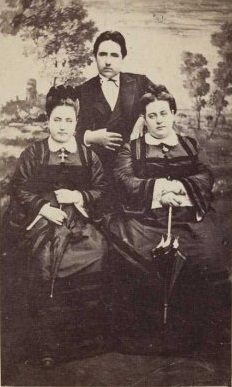
Manuel and his sisters

The Llanzas are one of the oldest families in Catalonia, recorded already in the 12th century. In the early 17th century one of its branches settled at a large pairal estate in Vilassar de Mar. Its descendant and Manuel's paternal grandfather, Rafael de Llanza i de Valls (1772–1833), made a very picturesque figure during the Napoleonic period. His military career was extremely windy: first he fought against the French (in Catalonia), then as a French ally against the English (in Galicia and Portugal), the Austrians (in Italy) and the Prussians (in Pomerania and Denmark), was incarcerated for attempt to join national anti-French rising of 1808, as a volunteer reached Moscow and ended up in the army of Ferdinand VII. His diary provides excellent first-hand insight into the plight of Spanish troops in Russia.

Rafael's son and Manuel's father, Benito Llanza y de Esquivel (1822–1863), initially also served in the army. However, he became known as high official of Ministerio de Instrucción Pública in successive Narváez governments, member of intellectual elite and engaged in disputes with the likes of Pablo Piferrer, Joan Mañé i Flaquer, Francesc Pi i Margall, Manuel Milà i Fontanals and Manuel Tamayo y Baus. Himself he tried his hand in letters and was also co-founder of l’Acadèmia Provincial de Belles Arts de Barcelona. In 1849 he married Maria de la Concepción Pignatelli de Aragón y Belloni (1824-1858), duchess of Solferino and condesa de Centelles, descendant to a family originating from Italy and heiress to enormous land fortune in Aragon. Politically close to the Moderados he probably aspired to political career, thwarted by his premature death.

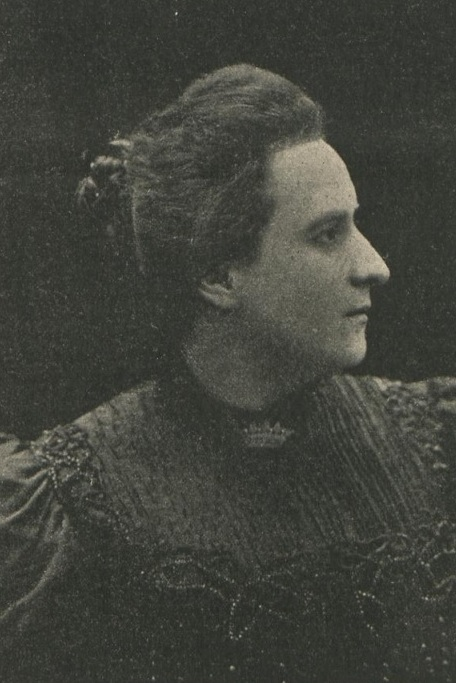
Maria de Bobadilla

The couple had 5 children: Manuel was born as the younger one of two sons. Little is known about his childhood, except that he was very early orphaned by both parents; since his older brother died in infancy, he inherited all aristocratic titles and the family fortune at the age of 10. Together with sisters he was raised by paternal uncle, Rafael Llanza y Esquivel, who unlike his brother was a vehement Carlist. The family left Spain following declaration of the Republic and returned in 1876; Manuel enrolled in law at Universidad de Barcelona and graduated at unspecified time in the late 1870s. In 1881 he married Maria Asunción de Bobadilla y Martínez de Arizala (1861-1898), descendant to a wealthy Navarrese family; her father, Mauricio de Bobadilla y Escrivá de Romaní, was head of Navarrese Carlism and served as deputy from Estella in Cortes Constituentes between 1869 and 1871. The couple settled in Solferino's palace in Barcelona. They had 7 children, born between 1884 and 1895. The oldest son, Luis Gonzaga de Llanza y de Bobadilla, inherited the ducado and together with his brother Francisco became active in Catalan Carlism, though none of them grew into prominence as a politician.

== Early political activity ==
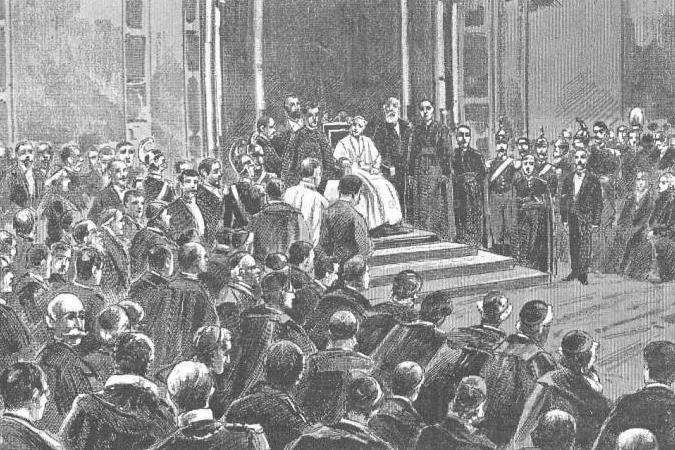
Leo XIII and the Spaniards

As a grandee of Spain Solferino was welcome in Carlism and the party propaganda took advantage of his name as early as in 1872. Initial Solferino's engagement in Carlism, politics and public life was very much formatted along the Integrist pattern. In the aftermath of military defeat, suffered in 1876, the party was dominated by Cándido Nocedal. The former neocatólico shaped Carlism as focused almost exclusively on religious threads and intended to maintain public mobilization by means of Catholic initiatives. Key element of this strategy were massive semi-political pilgrimages. The first one took place in October 1876, with almost 6,000 pilgrims reaching Rome; Solferino was listed as one of the most prestigious participants. Similarly, he took part in the next pilgrimage to Rome of 1878. In 1881 his position changed from prestigious participant to one of the organizers, as he emerged as treasurer of Junta Organizativa de Barcelona of the next pilgrimage, planned for 1882 and finally called off due to political reasons.

In the 1880s Solferino was extremely active in pilgrimage activities, many of them also marked with Nocedalista political undertones; as organizer he appeared hand-in-hand with iconic Integrist figures like Félix Sardá y Salvany. Though re-launch of the aborted 1882 visit to Rome, attempted as late as 1885, did not work out, Solferino was arranging smaller-scale pilgrimages to Catalan sanctuaries like in 1886 to Montserrat or to foreign ones like in 1887 to Lourdes; in 1887 he was formally appointed member of the bishop commission, entrusted with co-ordination of pilgrimage activities. Already in 1877 listed as member of Junta Directiva of the Barcelona branch of Juventud Católica, in the mid-1880s he grew to Catalan presidency of the organization. Hosting bishops in his private residence, he donated money to Catholic initiatives. Listed as active in clearly Carlist enterprises like erecting monument to Zumalacarregui (in 1883) or commemorating fallen Carlists (in 1888) he was acknowledged as organizer also by civil administration: in 1887 mayor of Barcelona appointed him to commission coordinating charity activities.

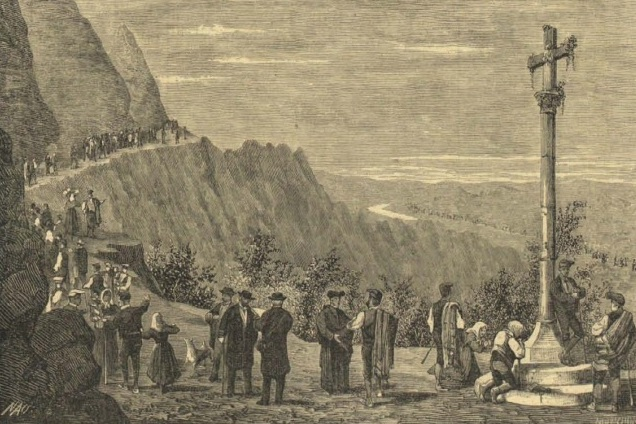
pilgrimage to Montserrat, 1880s

Solferino is not listed as key protagonist in an internal Carlist conflict, developing between Ramón Nocedal and the claimant Carlos VII. Hitherto pilgrimage activities seemed to format him as an Integrist supporter, especially that he kept addressing Nocedal and Sardá with venerating letters and in 1886 the press reported him as one of "jefes del integrismo catalan". However, as one of two grands adhering to Carlism he was also celebrated - despite his young age - by the claimant, who already in 1885 invited Solferino to his Venice residence. Though in early 1888 the Nocedalista daily El Siglo Futuro publicized Llanza's solidarity with Nocedal, in the moment of choice he decided to stand by the claimant; in 1889 the same newspaper already ridiculed the duke.

== Deputy and senator ==
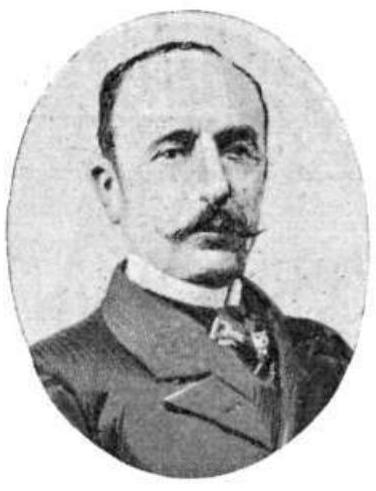
de Cerralbo

Following the Integrist secession the new Carlist political leader, marqués de Cerralbo, embarked on institutional build-up of the movement. The emergent nationwide structures were originally set up to celebrate the centenary of conversion of Recaredo, but they gave rise to firm party organization. As the Aragón Carlist leader Francisco Cavero withdrew from politics it was Solferino, resident of Barcelona but one of major landholders in the region, appointed leader of Aragon junta. By this token he also entered the nationwide party executive, Junta Central Superior. His position within the party was confirmed when in 1889 he was invited to Frohsdorf to attend the wedding of doña Blanca; his position in public life was confirmed when he became object of ridicule on part of the hostile press.

As Junta Central turned into a body coordinating the first Carlist electoral campaign of the Restoration Solferino became one of key so-called aperturistas; together with Cerralbo he pursued the path of acknowledging the system by at least partially adhering to its political rules. In 1890 he launched his own electoral campaign, standing in the Catalan Vich close to where he lived and in the Aragon Huesca where his major estate was. Though in Huesca he clearly lost, the Vich result remained heavily contested; the voting took place in February 1891, but he was finally declared victorious in the summer of 1892, just a month before the Cortes was dissolved. Though his influence in Vich was described by the press as "grandisima", in the following campaign he did not stand; instead, having completed 35 years of age Solferino decided to exercise his grandeza de España right and in 1893 he was admitted to the Senate, sitting as the only Carlist except de Cerralbo himself. Though the Catalan Carlist leader was Luis de Llauder y Dalmases, Solferino was gradually emerging as one of key regional jefes, presiding over some party meetings as early as in 1896. He remained involved in pilgrimage activities. A close collaborator of Llauder, both worked together developing regional Traditionalist media, especially a daily Correo Catalan and a weekly La Hormiga de Oro.

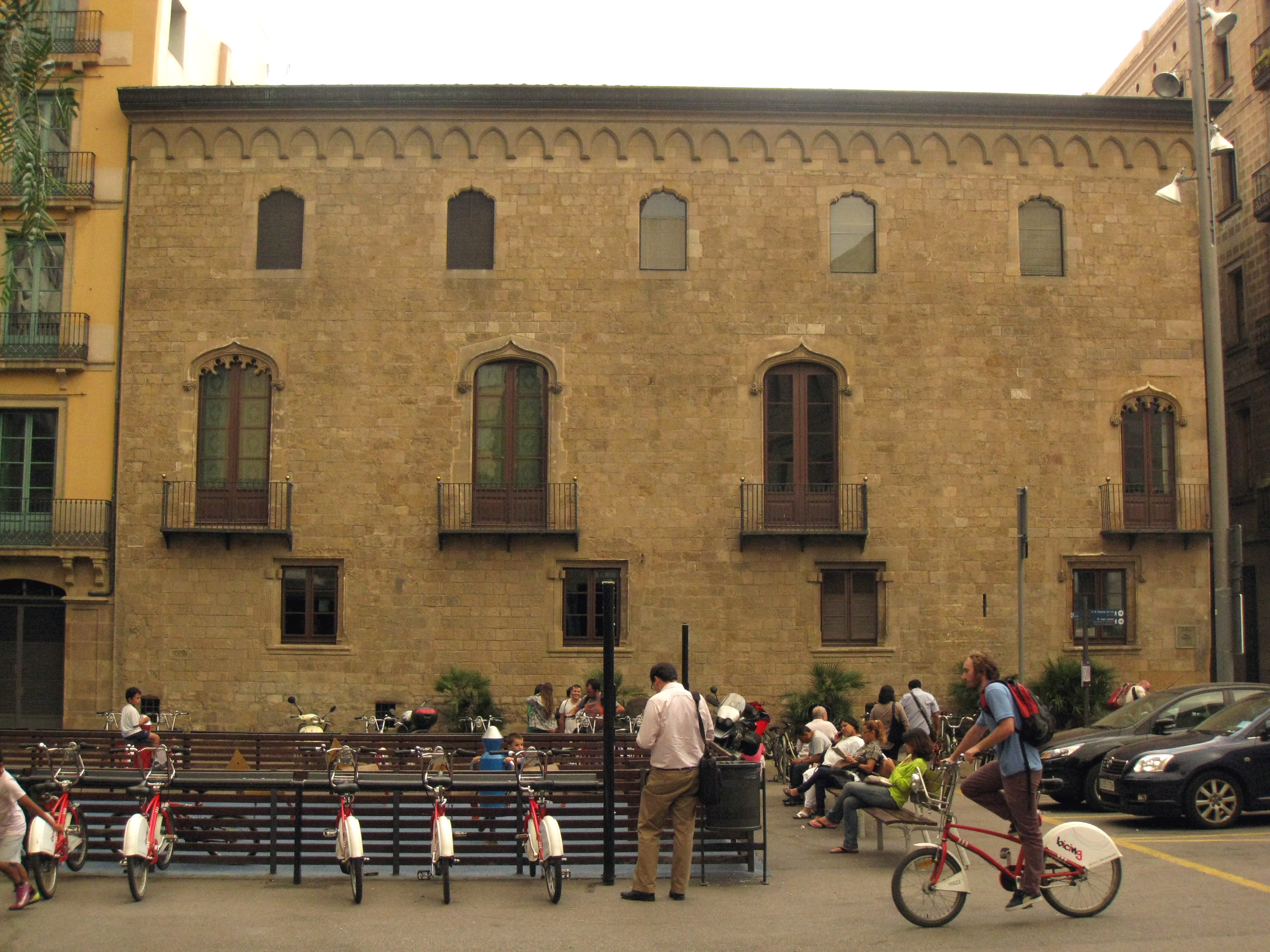
Solferino palace, Barcelona

In 1896 together with other Carlist deputies and senators Solferino withdrew from the Cortes; denying allegations that like in 1872, the act was introduction to Carlist insurgency, he nevertheless signed a letter lambasting the turnista system as corrupted and unsustainable. The same year he took part in ambiguous gatherings hailing general Moore and in 1898 he presented Carlos VII with an enigmatic gift. His actual involvement in La Octubrada, a series of minor Catalan Carlist 1900 revolts, is highly unclear. Though scholars do not list him among those involved and at the time of the disturbances he was together with other Carlist leaders in Paris, contemporary press noted that Badalona raid originated from Torre Baró estate of his brother-in-law Sivatte. Security forces searched his Barcelona palace tearing off the floor and allegedly discovered few rifles. Solferino denied any involvement, which did not spare him brief detention in 1901.

== Solidaritat Catalana ==
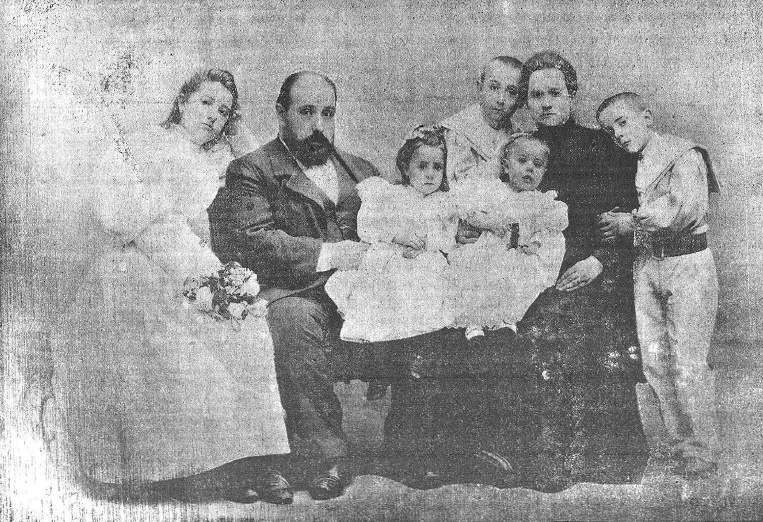
with his family (1898)

In the early 20th century Solferino counted among the regional party heavyweights, an example of politician from "inner circle", composed mostly of aristocrats governing the Traditionalist structures. By democratic Barcelona press he was acknowledged as one of "más conspicuos personajas da la reacción". Declaring utter loyalty to the new national leader Matías Barrio, Llanza remained on very good terms with the deposed one, de Cerralbo; by some he was associated with intrigues aiming at enforcing abdication of the claimant in favor of his son, don Jaime. When the Catalan jefe Luis Llauder died in 1902 Solferino was one of the candidates for succession, but regional jefatura went to a military veteran, Erasmo de Janer; Solferino had to settle for the provincial Barcelona leadership. At this post he threw himself into re-organizing local press activities: in 1903 he co-founded and presided over publishing house Fomento de la Prensa Tradicionalista; he re-launched Correo Catalan and enforced personal changes in its managing and editorial structures.

As aging Janer was in his mid-70s, Solferino was gradually emerging as the key Carlist politician in Catalonia. Not a rally-type public speaker, he excelled rather in behind-the-stage dealings. In mid-1900s together with his protégé Junyent he emerged as advocate of a broad Catalanist coalition, forged by opposition to the 1906 Ley de Jurisdicciones. Though alliance with different breeds of Republicanism raised many eyebrows and public embrace between Solferino - representative of "blood-thirsty clericalism" - and vehemently anti-clerical Salmerón sent shocking waves across Catalonia, Llanza enjoyed full support of the claimant, also when joining executive junta of Solidaritat Catalana. The strategy paid off with excellent performance at the polls; in the 1907 Cortes elections the Catalan Carlists won 7 mandates compared to the usual 1-2 tickets and in the 1909 provincial campaign they won 7 tickets compared to the usual 4. Moreover, the alliance became sort of a model for Carlists elsewhere, with emulating attempts in Vascongadas, Galicia and Asturias.

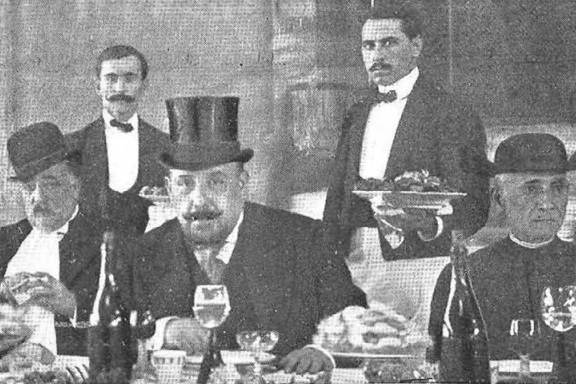
with the Catalans, 1908

According to some scholars the 1907 success elevated Catalan Carlism from "marginal phenomenon restricted to Pyrenean foothills" to an entirely new stature. Solferino himself assumed a new tone when speaking in the Senate; in 1908 the national press reported him as declaring Spain a confederation and confirming that "Cataluña es un Estado y España una Confederación". In return he was accused of having been anti-Spanish. Though in 1909 Solidaritat Catalana fell apart, Solferino and Junyent kept advocating rapprochement with the nationalists. This stance produced differences between Solferino and Janer; as a result, in 1909 the former resigned from the provincial Barcelona jefatura.

== Jefe ==
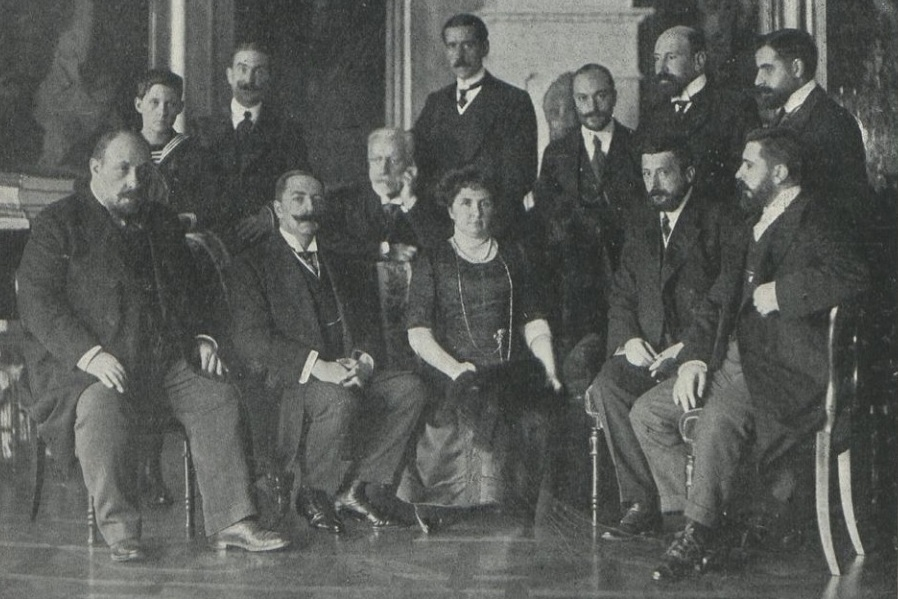
with his king, 1911

Already in 1908 there were rumors of Solferino replacing Janer, but they turned into fact no earlier than two years later; enjoying good relations with the new claimant don Jaime, in February 1910 the duque was appointed the new jefe of regional Catalan Carlism. Though he was further amicably disposed towards La Lliga, Solferino's tenure is rather marked by his efforts to cope with another new phenomenon. At that time Catalunya muntanyenca, traditional inner-Catalonia of rural hills and valleys, was getting dominated by the maritime belt, the urban area and its newly emergent social strata. One of its features was proletarian radicalism of different political signs, including Carlism.

Around the turn of the decades the center of gravity of Catalan Carlism moved from countryside to Barcelona; between 1907 and 1913 the number of circulos in the city grew from 3 to 11, most of the new ones in peripheral workers districts. Since the 1906 rout of Traditionalist youth at the Arenas bullring, suffered at hands of the Lerrouxist hit-squad, new Carlist proletarian groupings were getting increasingly radical. Though the movement has always been known for its belligerent spirit if not sheer brutality, specifics of the newly emergent Barcelona Requeté organization was its penchant for a new type of urban violence, known as pistolerismo. Already in 1908 Solferino was interrogated by the police in relation to an obscure and unexplained episode known as "caso Rull". After taking office he declared war on youth party radicalism, advocated by the likes of Dalmacio Iglesias, claiming that it compromised Carlist reputation of "the party of order". Following the 1912 Granollers incident, when Requetés fired at Republican crowd resulting in one fatal casualty and many people wounded, Solferino dissolved the nucleus of radicalism, Ateneo Tradicionalista, though the conflict with its activists like Vives Suria continued also later on.

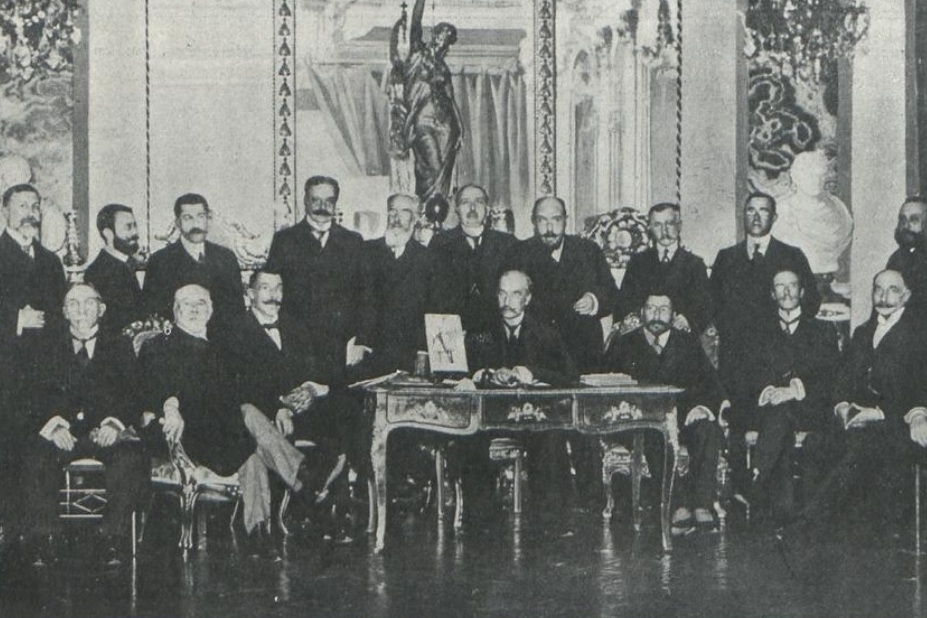
with de Cerralbo and the Carlist party executive, 1913

In terms of political vision Solferino pursued a rather flexible strategy, tending to support various Right-wing coalitions where possible. Always rather conciliatory towards the Integrists, in 1910 he endorsed "coalición de elementos de orden" later aiming for alliances with Integros, La Lliga, Conservatives and Comité de Defensa Social. At that time he was already a follower of Vázquez de Mella, most dynamic Carlist politician increasingly at odds with the claimant. When a pro-Mellist de Cerralbo was reinstated as national jefe, in 1912 Solferino was appointed to the newly created national executive, Junta Central Superior, and entered two of its specialized committees. Though don Jaime was increasingly upset with Solferino and his rule in Catalonia, officially he demonstrated accord. It was rather Llanza who was getting tired of conflict, especially as Junta Provincial of Lleida refused to accept a Barcelona-appointed Carlist candidate to the Cortes and situation in the province became increasingly chaotic. Solferino first tried to resign in 1913, but it was not until May 1914 resignation of the entire Junta Regional that Junyent was appointed his successor.

== Last years ==
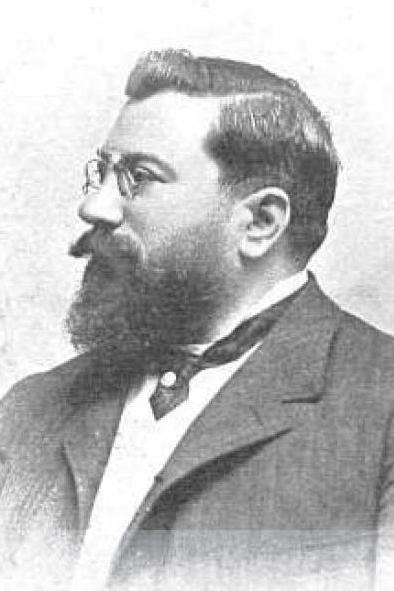
Juan Vazquez de Mella

Decomposition and chaos in Catalan Carlism continued; unable to cope and re-introduce discipline, Junyent and the new Junta Regional resigned and were indeed dismissed in 1916. Solferino was reinstated as regional leader in February 1917, but the crisis kept unfolding. Provincial issues aside, its dominating thread became the conflict between supporters of don Jaime and those siding with Vazquez de Mella. As in 1918 the claimant was released from his home arrest in Austria, early next year he arrived in Paris and issued two manifestos, lambasting those disloyal and announcing forthcoming personal changes. Solferino initially adopted what seemed like a wait-and-see policy, mid-February 1919 issuing a circular which urged order and discipline. However, next month he addressed the new national leader, Pascual Comín, with a resignation note.

Political path of Solferino after 1919 is not entirely clear. Competent scholars claim that he left mainstream Carlism and joined the Mellistas, at that time attempting to institutionalize their group as a separate party. However, despite his prestigious title and high position within Traditionalist structures, the most detailed study on the Mellist breakup does not list him at all. Contemporary press mentioned him first in relation to Traditionalism and later to Acción Popular. To make matters worse, 1923 newspapers reported that Solferino conferred with don Jaime and some went on naming him as "carlista". Perhaps the safest conclusion is the one suggested by his obituaries, namely that in the last years of his life Solferino simply distanced himself from politics. Indeed, he is not reported as engaged in any primoderiverista institutions.

As the first taxpayer of the Huesca province and one of the wealthiest Barcelona residents Solferino was involved in numerous economic activities, especially those related to agriculture: from taking part in fairs and competitions to animating mutual insurance associations, landholders' organizations, lobbying and drafting banking real estate credit regulations; he was member of Instituto Agrícola Catalán de San Isidro. At one point he was heavily engaged in an attempt to launch an engineering high school in Barcelona; his "Politécnico de Barcelona" company donated part of the Torre Baró estate to host the facilities, but Escuela de ingenieros electricistas idea has ultimately failed to take shape. He revealed particular interest in the energy sector also later on, co-managing Exposición Internacional de Industrias Eléctricas.

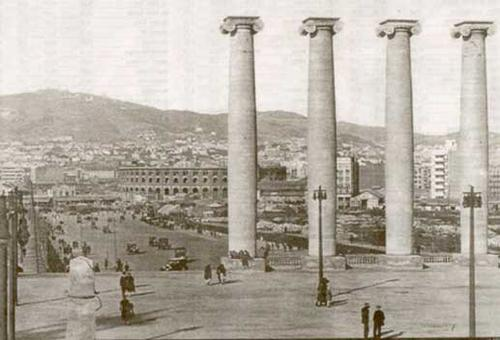
Barcelona, late 1920s

For decades Solferino has been engaged in different projects aiming at facilitating transport of agricultural products from Aragon to Catalan ports, like technological upgrade of Canal de Aragón y Cataluña or works on enhancement of Barcelona maritime transport infrastructure. In the last Restauración years he co-launched the idea of building a railway line connecting the Aragon Pyrenees and the Ebro mouth, advancing it in the senate. A little known fact is that he campaigned against duels, remaining an activist of Liga Antiduelista. Until the end of his life he was engaged in Catholic groupings, especially Conferencias de San Vicente de Paúl and Pía Unión de San Miguel Arcángel. Suffering from overweight-related health problems, he died of a pulmonary embolism.

== See also ==
- Carlism
- Catalanism
- Mellismo
- Solidaritat Catalana
- Ducado de Solferino
- Luis de Llanza y de Bobadilla
- Can Maians
- Palau Centelles
