= Monastery of Santa María de Huerta =

Cistercian monastery in Spain

- Monasterio de Santa María de Huerta (Spanish)
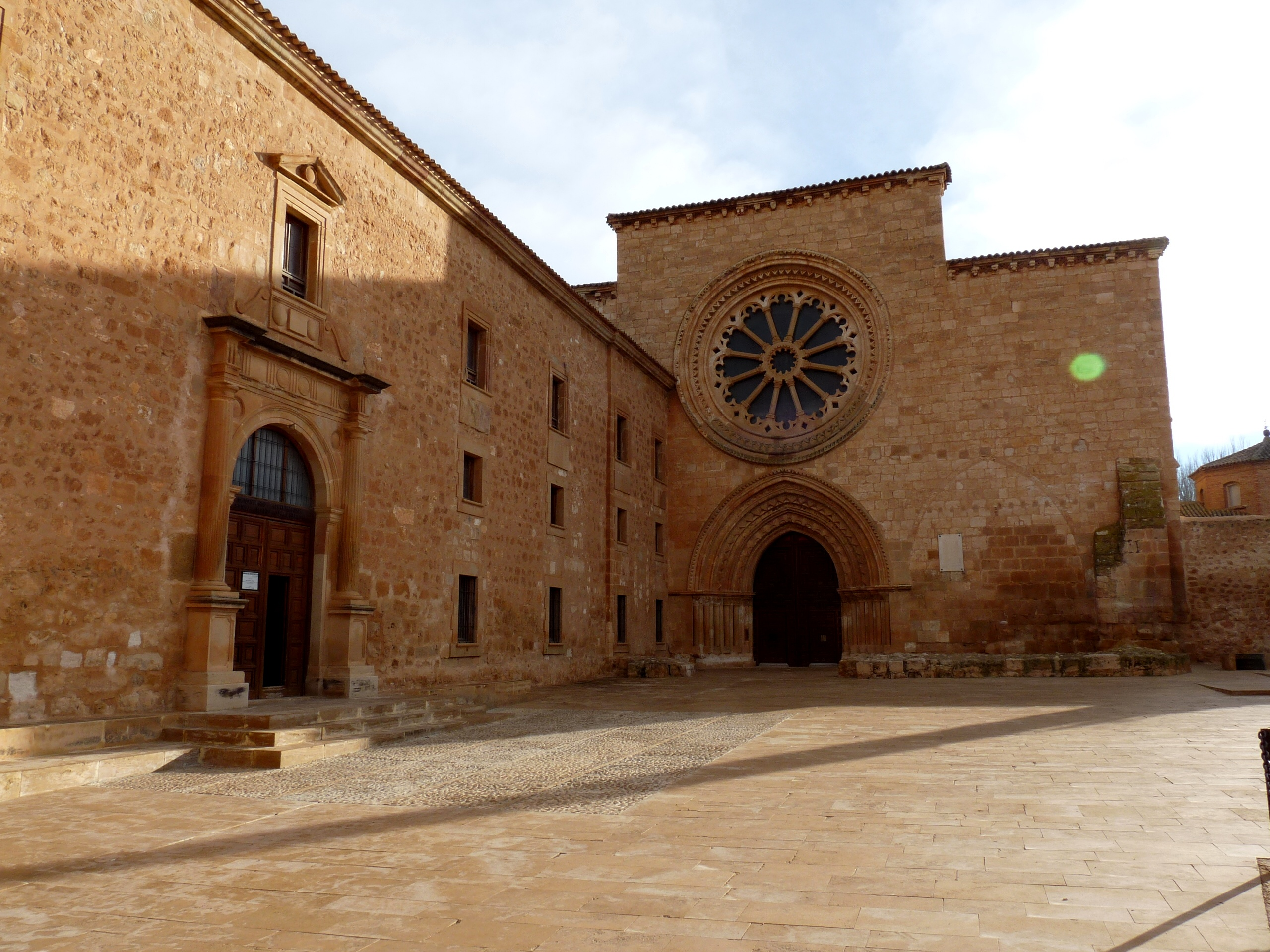

- Location within Spain
- 41.26167°N 2.17694°W
- Location: Santa María de Huerta, Spain

Spanish Cultural Heritage
- Official name: Monasterio de Santa María de Huerta
- Type: Non-movable
- Criteria: Monument
- Designated: 1882
- Reference no.: RI-51-0000033

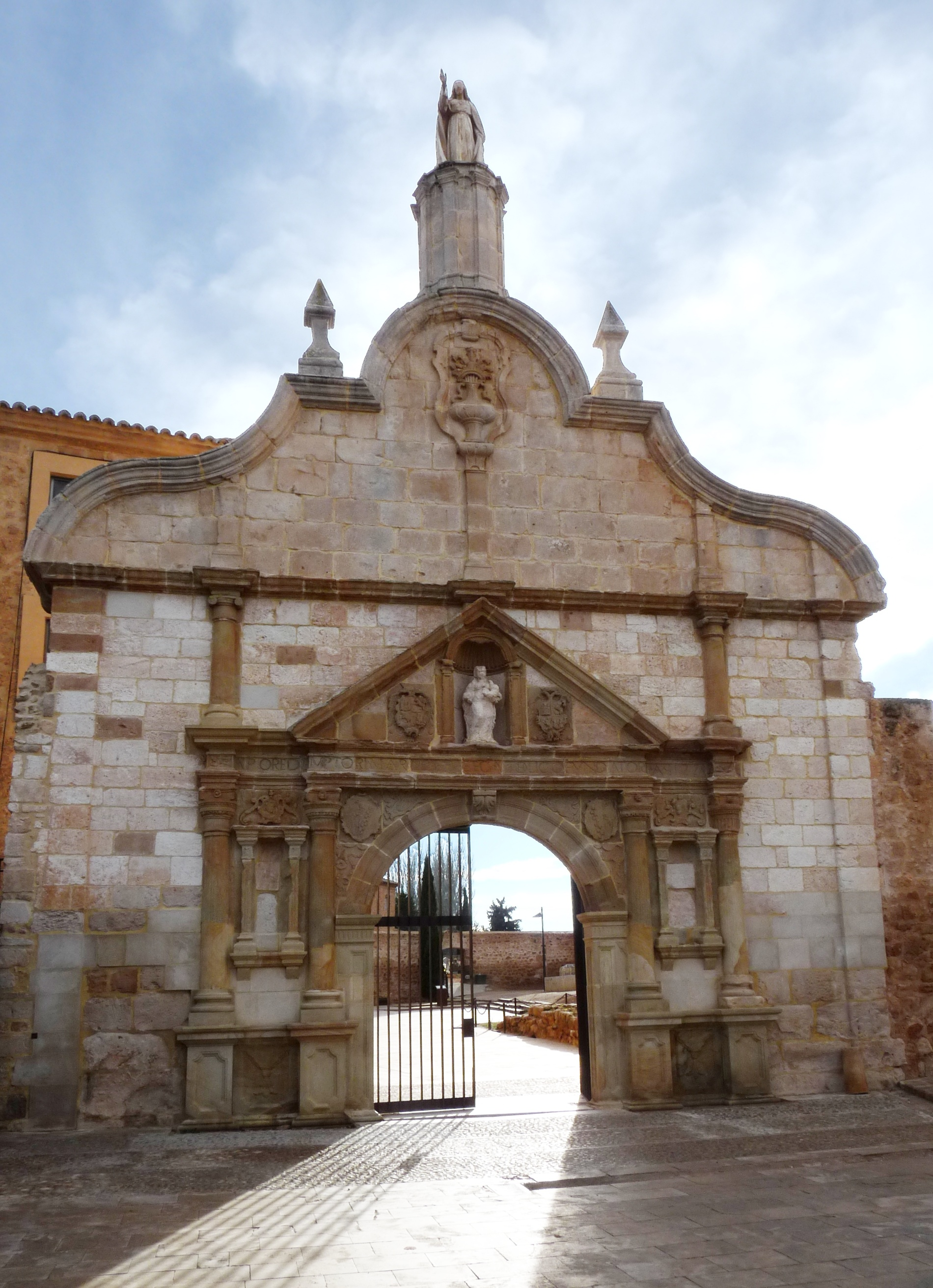
Entrance to the Monasterio de Santa María de Huerta.

The Monastery of Santa María de Huerta (Spanish: Monasterio de Santa María de Huerta) is a Cistercian monastery located in Santa María de Huerta, in the Province of Soria, within the autonomous community of Castile and León. The foundation stone of the building was laid by Alfonso VII of León and Castile in 1179, and it was declared a national monument in 1882.

== History ==
The monastery was founded by King Alfonso VII of León and Castile, in fulfilment of a promise he made during the siege of Coria. As a first step in the project, immediately after the siege in 1142, Alfonso brought a community of Cistercian monks from the abbey of Berdoues in Gascony (France), together with their abbot, Rodulfo. Initially, the community was established in an inferior building in a place called Cántabos, located in the municipality of Fuentelmonge. This location had a poor water supply, so a new site was selected near the Jalón river. The transfer to this new site took place in 1162.

Saint Martin of Hinojosa was the fourth abbot of the monastery. He was named bishop of Sigüenza but resigned that post and returned to Santa María de Huerta. There, he was responsible for significant remodelling of the monastery until the original primitive building had been enlarged and transformed to include conventional Cistercian features. The revised building still stands today. Alfonso VII laid the foundation stone for the new construction on 20 March 1179. It is believed that the works were directed by the master of the cathedral of Sigüenza. They advanced very quickly, thanks to abundant donations and the protection of the king.

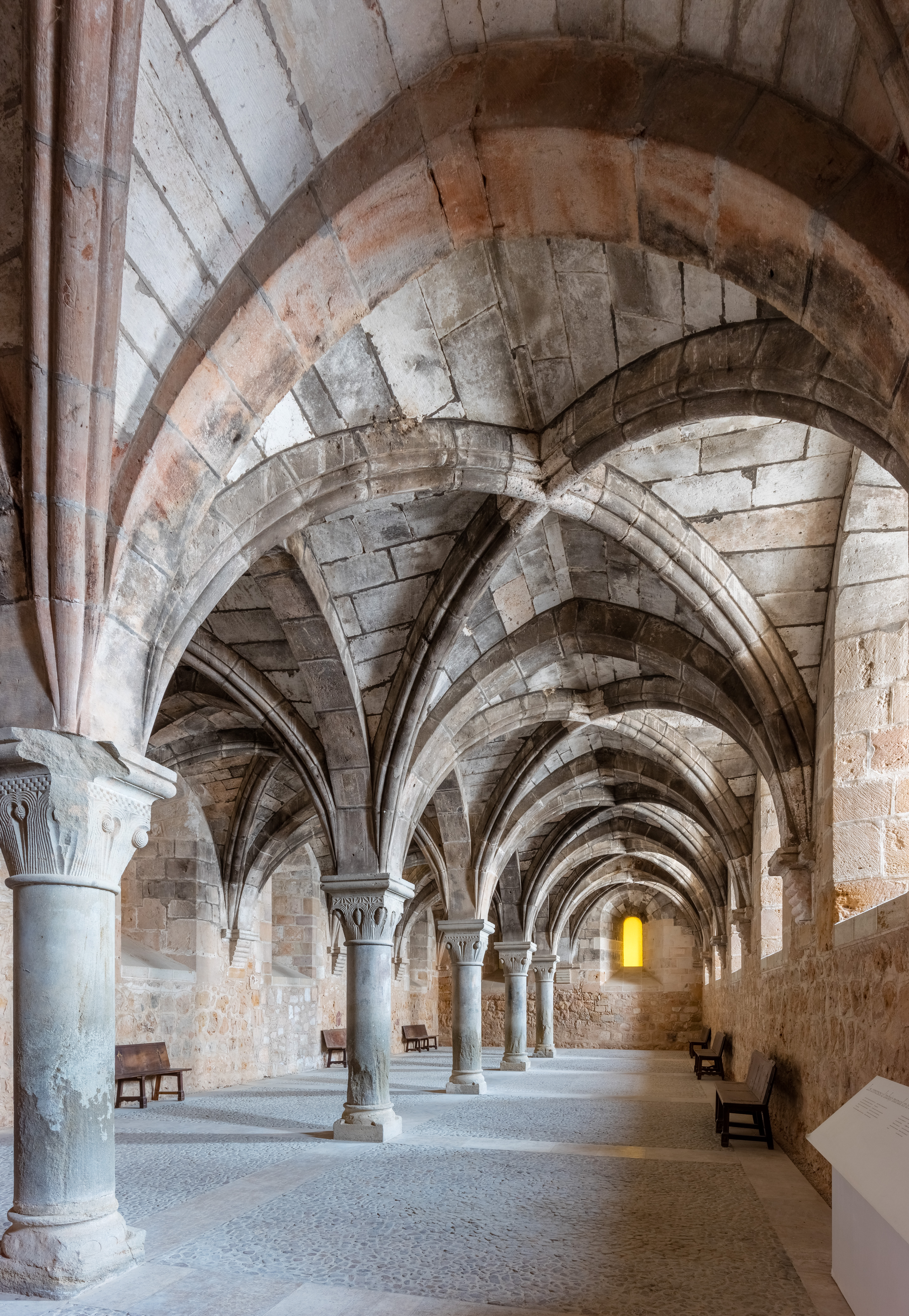
Hall of the Conversi.

One of the foremost patrons of the monastery was the archbishop of Toledo, Rodrigo Ximénez de Rada, nephew of Martin of Hinojosa. In his will, signed in Paris in April 1201, he ordered that he be buried in Santa María de Huerta. Throughout the years the foundation received many donations and alms, continuously enriching its heritage. Many of the concilĭa of the Cistercian Order were held in the monastery.

Other important sponsors were the Lords of Molina who chose the monastery for burial, including the first holder of the title, the count Manrique Pérez de Lara, as well as his son Pedro. They are both buried, together with other members of their lineage, in the pantheon of the Counts of Molina located in the Gothic cloister. Kings Alfonso II of Aragon and Peter II of Aragon were also benefactors of the monastery.

In 1215, Martín Muñoz de Hinojosa, Mayordomo mayor of Henry I and nephew of the abbot Martin of Hinojosa, paid for the building of a new refectory. In the 16th century he obtained aid and benefits from Charles V, Holy Roman Emperor and Philip II of Spain. During this time, additional construction works took place to enlarge and the monastic complex.

In 1833, as a consequence of the ecclesiastical confiscations of Mendizábal, the monks were expelled and the church was retained to serve as a parish church. The archaeologist Enrique de Aguilera y Gamboa, Marquess of Cerralbo, made an exhaustive study of the entire site, taking responsibility for documenting and publishing its history and taking an inventory of its artworks. Thanks to these efforts, this monastery could be saved from total ruin. In 1882 it was declared a national monument.

Since 1930, the monastery has been a community of monks of the Cistercian Order of the Strict Observance (Trappists). At present the Abbot of the monastery is Dom Isidoro Anguita and the community comprises approximately 24 brothers.

== The enclosure ==
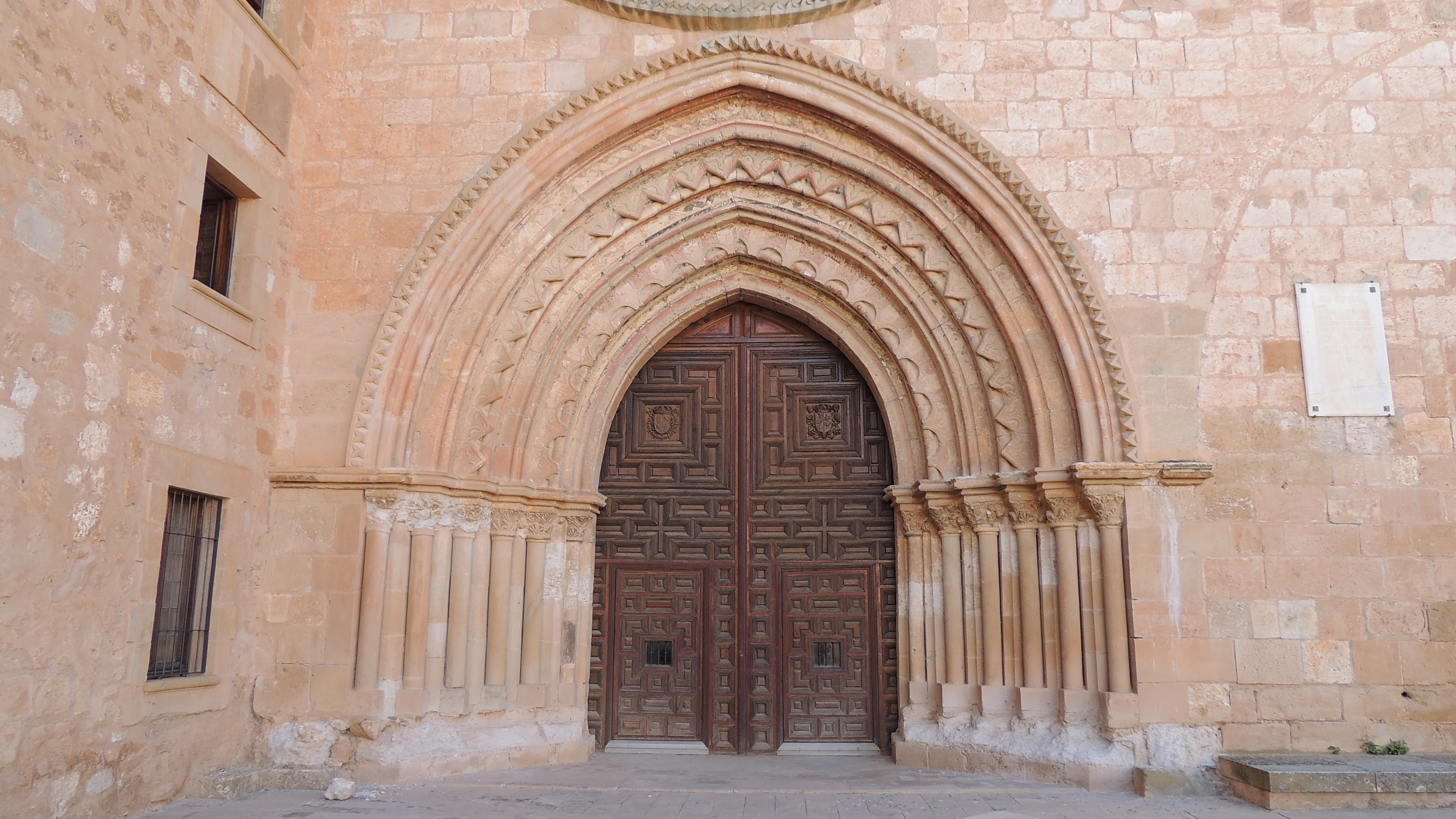
Portal of the church.

All the main buildings of the monastery (church, cloister, orchard, bakery, warehouses, workshops, etc.) are surrounded by a wall with eight crenellated towers. In the 16th century, the main entrance was revised by adding a door with a pediment featuring an image of the Virgin Mary. In 1771 the door was enlarged with an additional pediment adorned with the vase of lilies, a symbol of purity traditionally linked to Mary. The door opens onto a square in which the clergy house is located on the left (originally an abbatial room, general goal and stewards offices). Opposite is the facade of the church with a large rose window whose radii are small columns, and a pointed arch door combing smooth and sawtooth carved elements. The buildings that now make up the monastery itself were mainly constructed in the 16th century. The undercroft, the lay brothers' refectory and the church are the only elements dating from the end of 12th century, with some modifications in later centuries.

=== The church ===
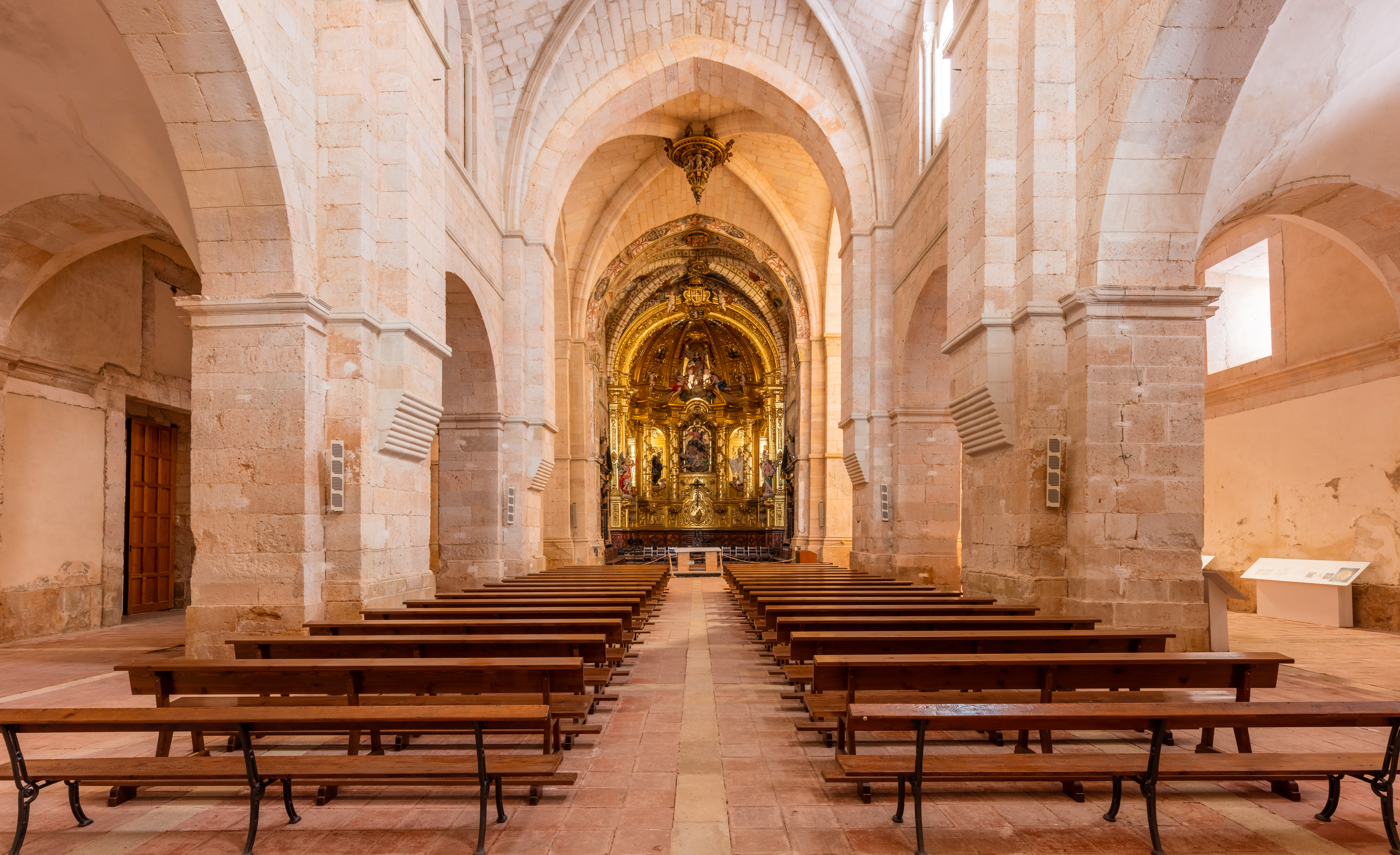
Interior of the church, with the altarpiece in the background.

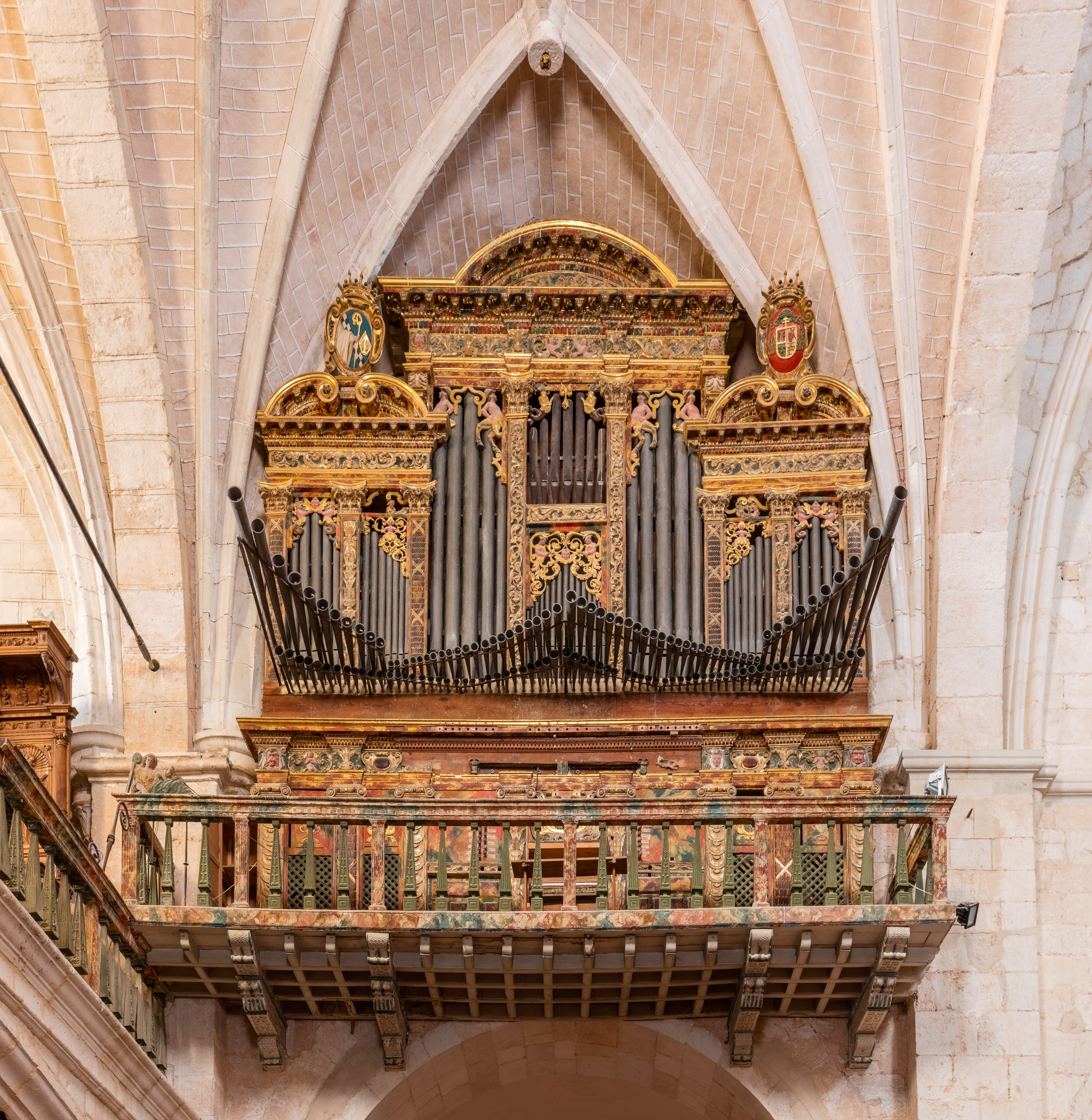
Pipe organ of the church.

The foundation stone was laid by Alfonso VII of León and Castile on 20 March 1179. Some changes were made at the end of the 18th century. Construction of the building began at the east end of the church with a conventional semicircular apse. The works progressed quickly, with the exception of the last four bays of the nave, which were completed in the 13th century. The nave was roofed over with simple vaulting and a wooden roof were built. That was replaced in 1632 by barrel vaulting. The central nave was changed again in the 18th century with the addition of cornices, capitals and a highly-decorated iron gate to isolate the enclosure from the part of the church intended for the laity. No changes were made to the exterior, which still stands as one of the most austere constructions of Cistercian architecture, including large buttresses in a double wall.

In plan, the church has three naves and a transept with five apsidal chapels having pointed arches and vaults of simple cross-section. Of the five apses, the one in the centre is semicircular and the other four are rectangular, in common with a Cistercian model that was also followed in the Monasterio de Santa María de Matallana (Province of Valladolid).

==== Interior ====
- The high altar is framed by a Baroque altarpiece by Félix Malo (from Calatayud), dating from 1766. The altarpiece is flanked by two marble urns from Calatorao, dating from the 17th century. These contain the remains of Bishop Ximénez de Rada and Abbot Martin of Hinojosa. At the side of the chapel are the tombs of the Dukes of Medinaceli, from 1632. On the walls of the presbytery large 18th century frescoes depict scenes from the battle of Las Navas de Tolosa.
- In the south arm of the transept, there are two large oil paintings of Alfonso VII and Alfonso VIII, also from the 18th century. There are also two Romanesque tombs of the Hinojosa family. The transept gives access to the octagonal chapel of Nuestra Señora del Destierro, built between 1747 and 1750, intended as a reliquary. A Romanesque image of the Virgin is kept there. According to tradition, Jiménez de Rada had this picture in his saddle at the battle of Las Navas de Tolosa. The image is a crude work, dating from the beginning of the 13th century. A copper crosier with cabochons is also kept here. This was found in the tomb of Abbot St. Martin of Hinojosa. The north transept leads to the tower, built in the 12th century, which had a spire added in the 17th century. From the tower it is possible to gain access to a chamber that was used in the 13th century as the chapter house, with an entrance from the cloister. In the 16th century it was transformed into a sacristy. Further north is the "capilla de Profundis", which is reached from the cloister. The corpses of the monks were exposed and watched in this chapel until they were buried. Prior to that, it seems that this was a place of work or library. The high choir has walnut seating manufactured in the second half of the 16th century.

== The refectory ==
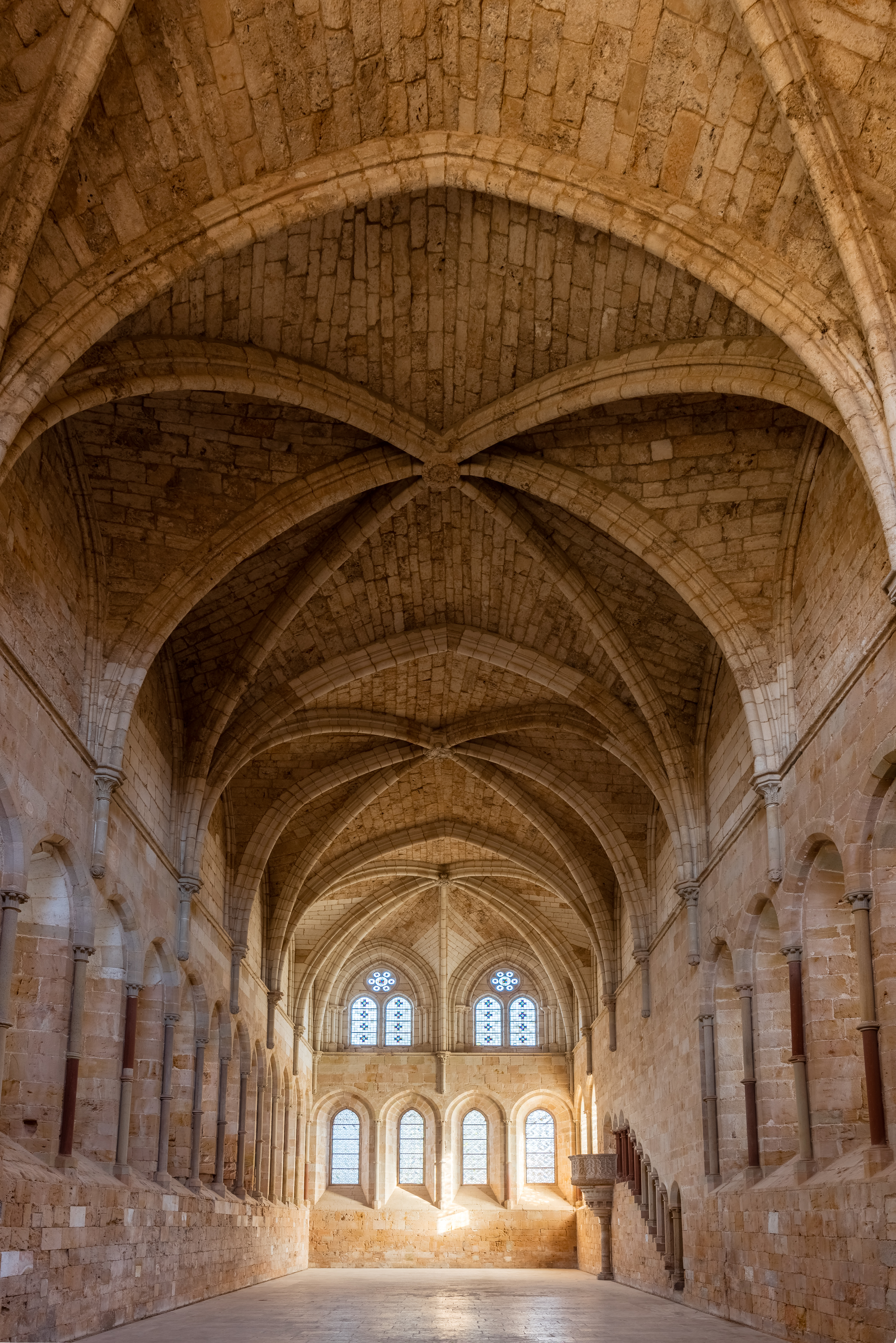
View of the refectory

On the north walk of the cloister is the façade of the refectory, dating from the 12th century. It has a pediment with rose window and a door with an archivolt very similar to the main door of the church. The refectory is the monastery's masterpiece. Construction began in 1215, at the expense of Martín Nuño de Hinojosa (nephew of Abbot Hinojosa). It is a large chamber with sexpartite vaults and beautiful pointed arched windows providing the room with good illumination. A staircase has been built into one of the walls, sheltered by a vault and giving access to a rostrum or pulpit from which a monk could read his companions some pious text while they ate. The Spanish art historian Vicente Lampérez y Romea claims that this is the most complete and beautiful example anywhere in Spain and that it is comparable with the most beautiful of any European monastery. The French historian Elie Lambert makes similar statements.

The refectory is connected to a large kitchen that has in its centre an immense square oven, supported by four pointed arches, an interesting example of this Spanish style.

== The cloisters ==
In the wall of the left nave of the church, a door was opened up in the 12th century, giving access to the cloister (called de Los Caballeros). The name refers to the fact that this was the burial place of noble families and other illustrious people. It is a good example of a Cistercian Gothic cloister.

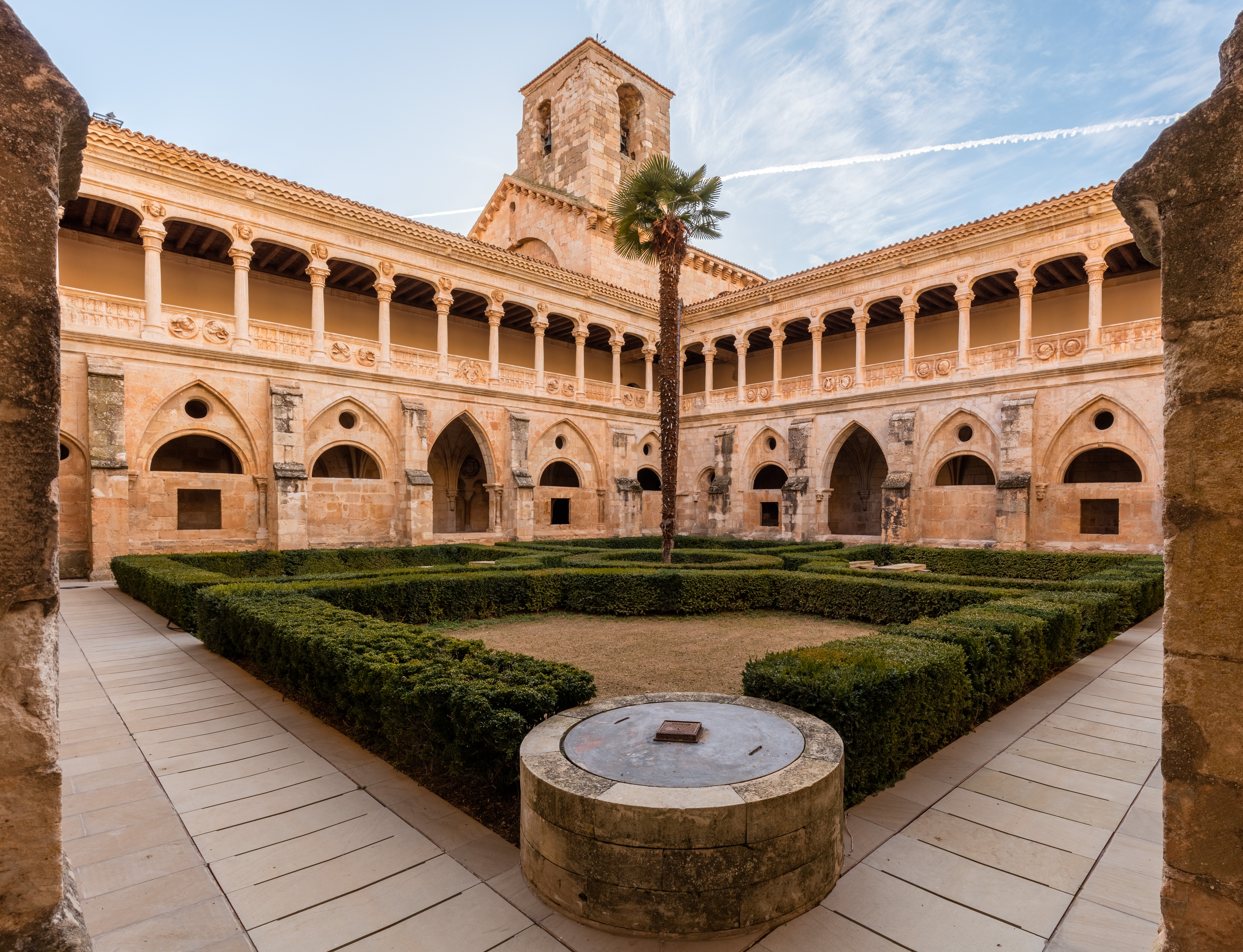
View of the Gothic/Plateresque cloister and the tower.

From the lower cloister de Los Caballeros, a magnificent staircase built in 1600 leads to the upper cloister. This is a Renaissance addition that began construction in 1533 and was completed in 1547. The four galleries of this cloister have very low arches and balusters, and are ornamented with medallions denoting the each of their names:

- Gallery of Kings (from Henry I of Castile)
- Gallery of Apostles
- Gallery of Adalides (military leaders)
- Gallery of Prophets

Within the galleries there are niches containing the busts of some of the more significant monks of the monastery (notable for their virtue or for some other reason).

The 12th century library is accessed from the upper cloister. It is a spacious room decorated according to the taste of the 17th century. At its peak, the library contained around 4000 volumes, many of which are conserved in the public library of Soria.

From the lower cloister, it is possible to access another cloister, called de la Hospedería. a work of Herrerian style, built approximately c. 1582. One of the sides had rooms for pilgrims who were heading for the Camino de Santiago.

The chapter house of this cloister dates from the 12th century. It was known as the "stable of Alfonso VIII". Historians consider it unlikely to have been used for that purpose, judging from its structure and ornamentation, but its actual use is unknown. In the western wing were the winery and the granary.

== Gallery ==
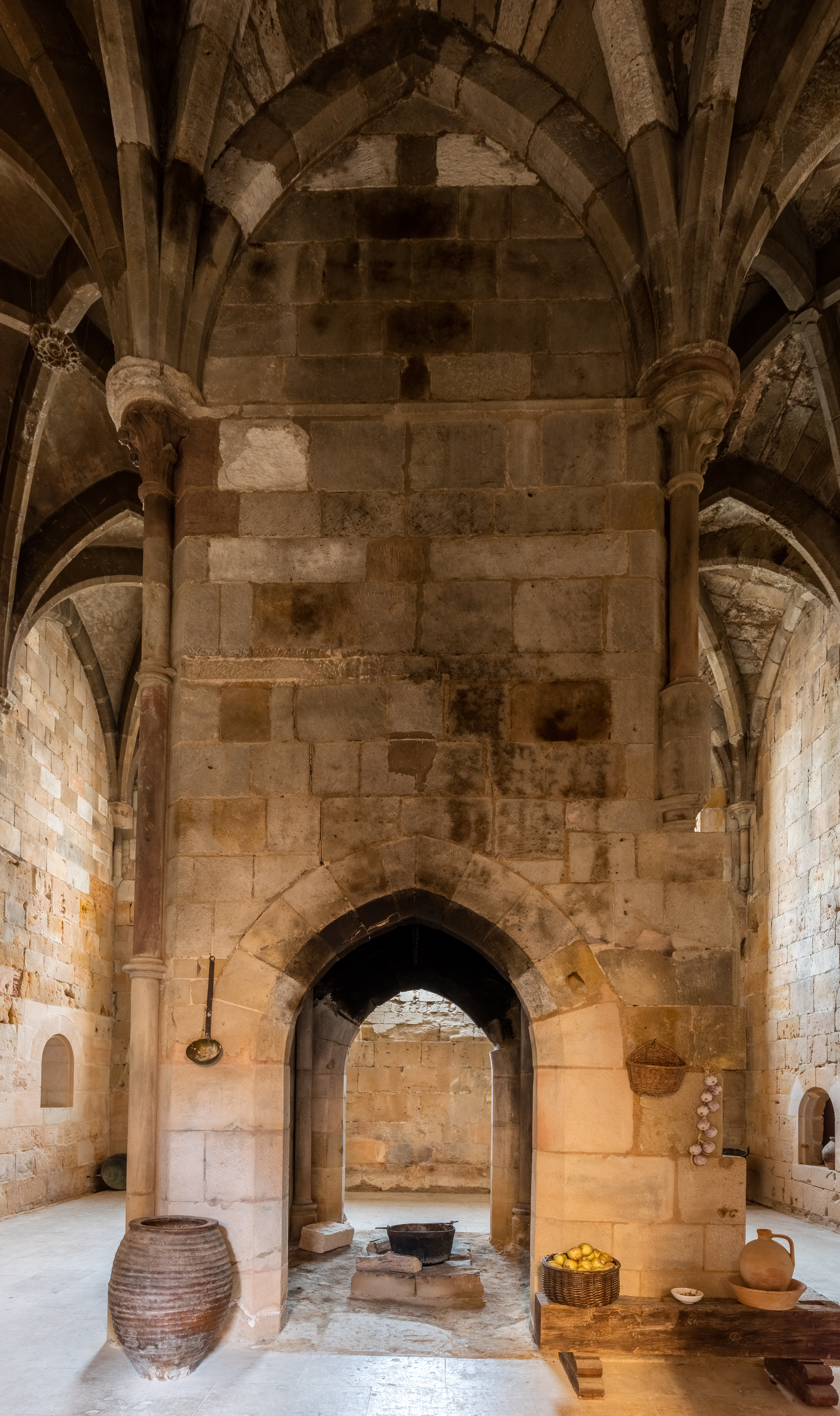
Kitchen.

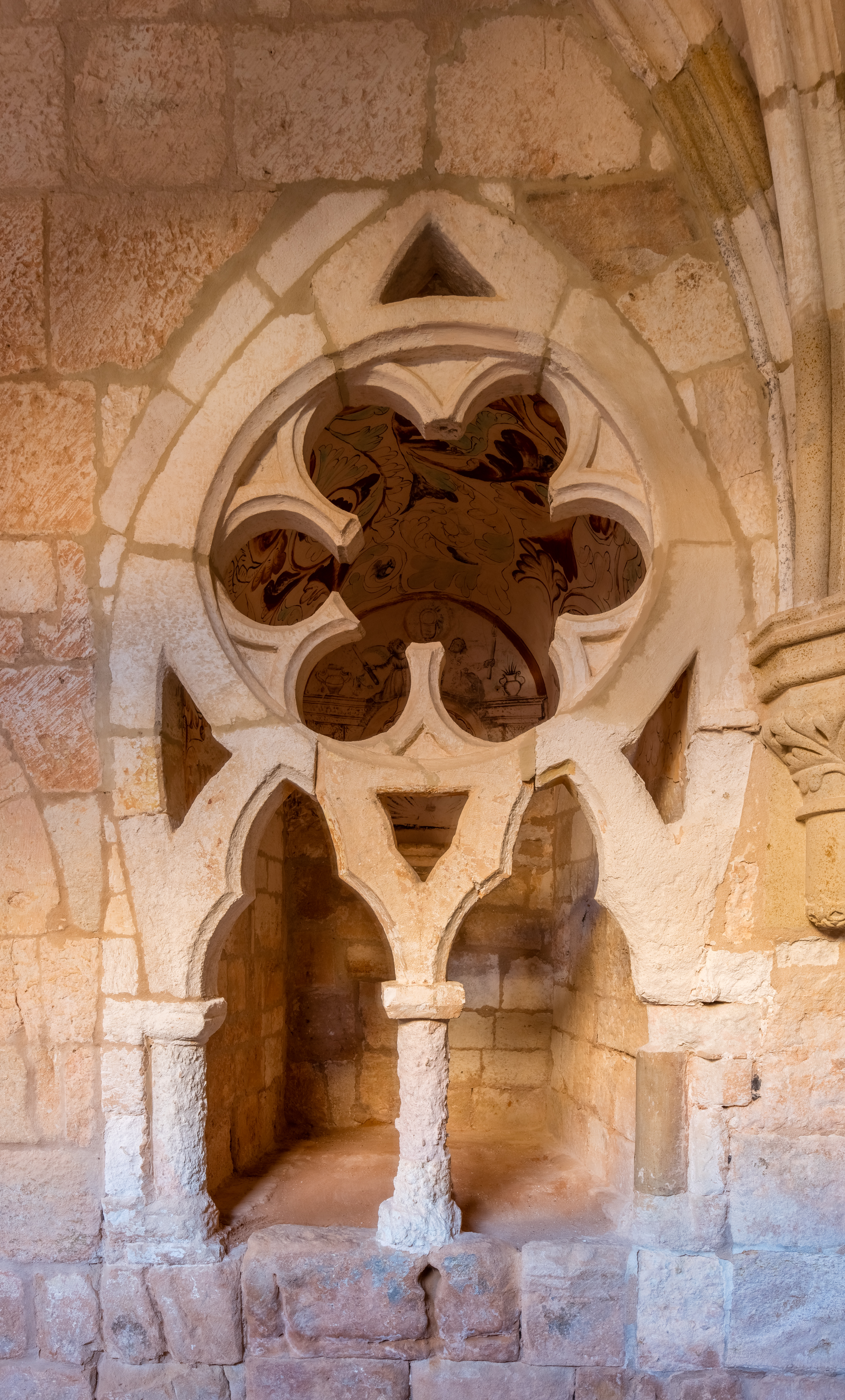
Window in the corridors of the cloister.

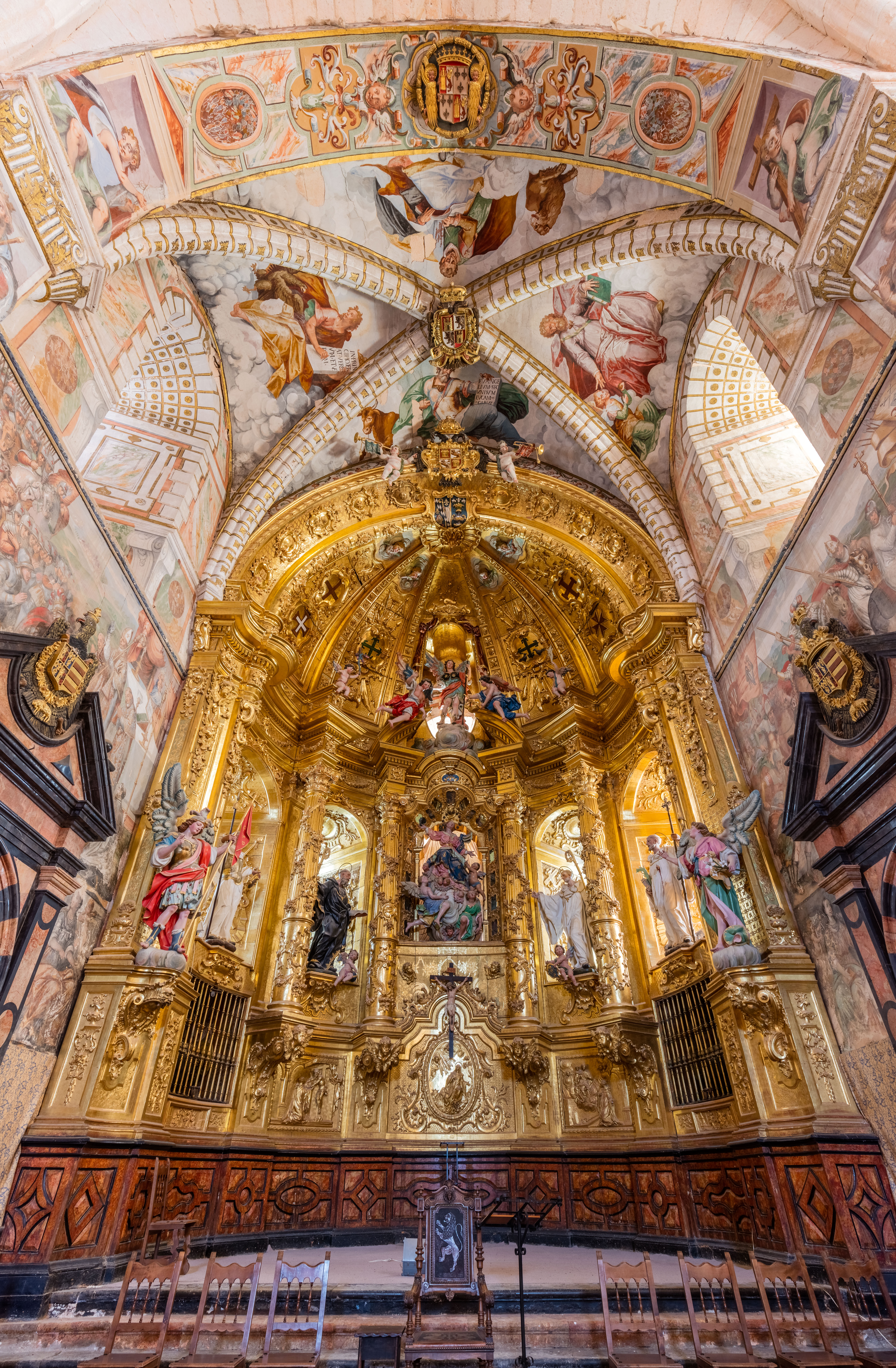
Altarpiece of the church.

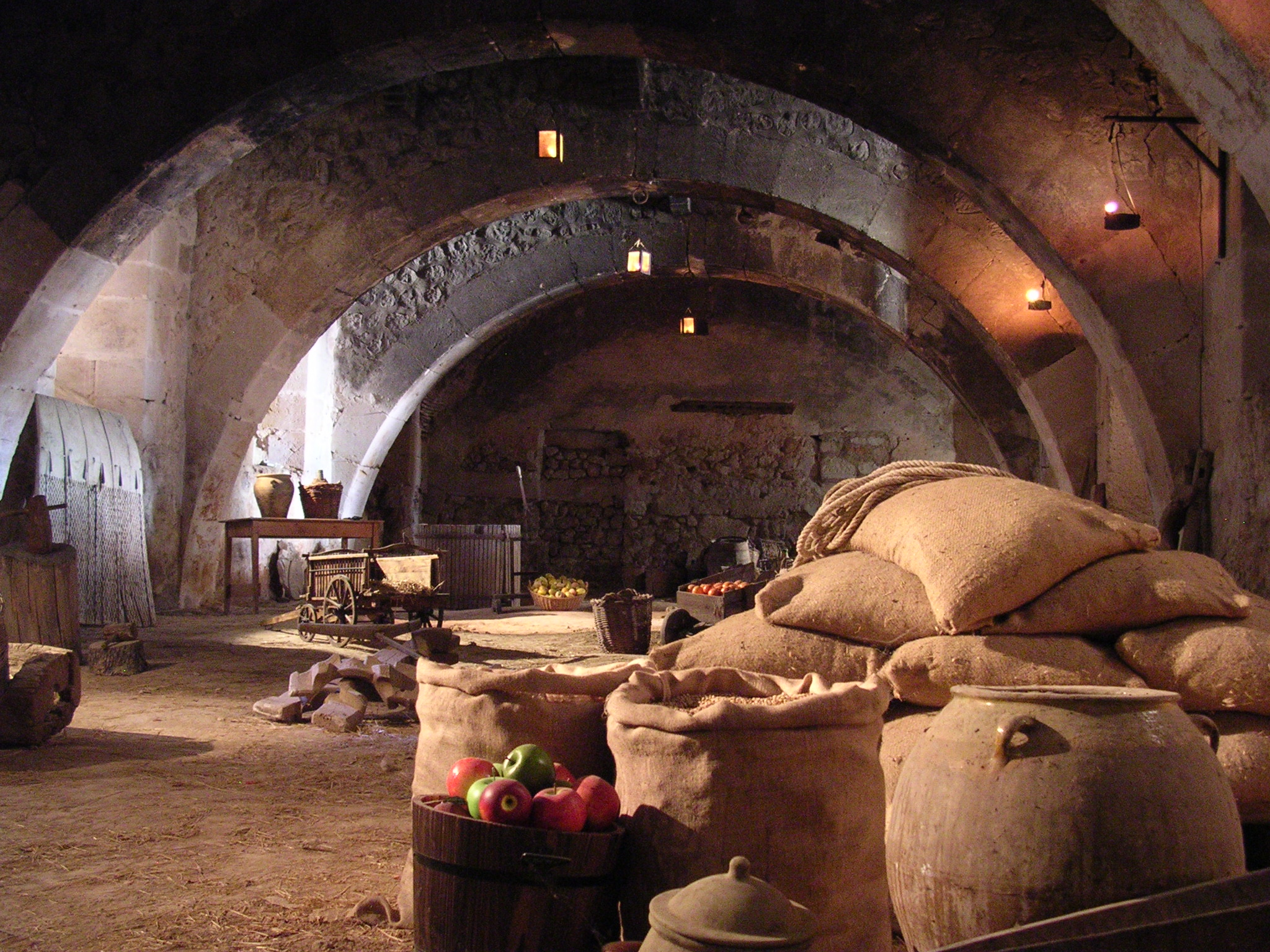
Old warehouse or cella of the Cistercian monastery of Santa María de Huerta.

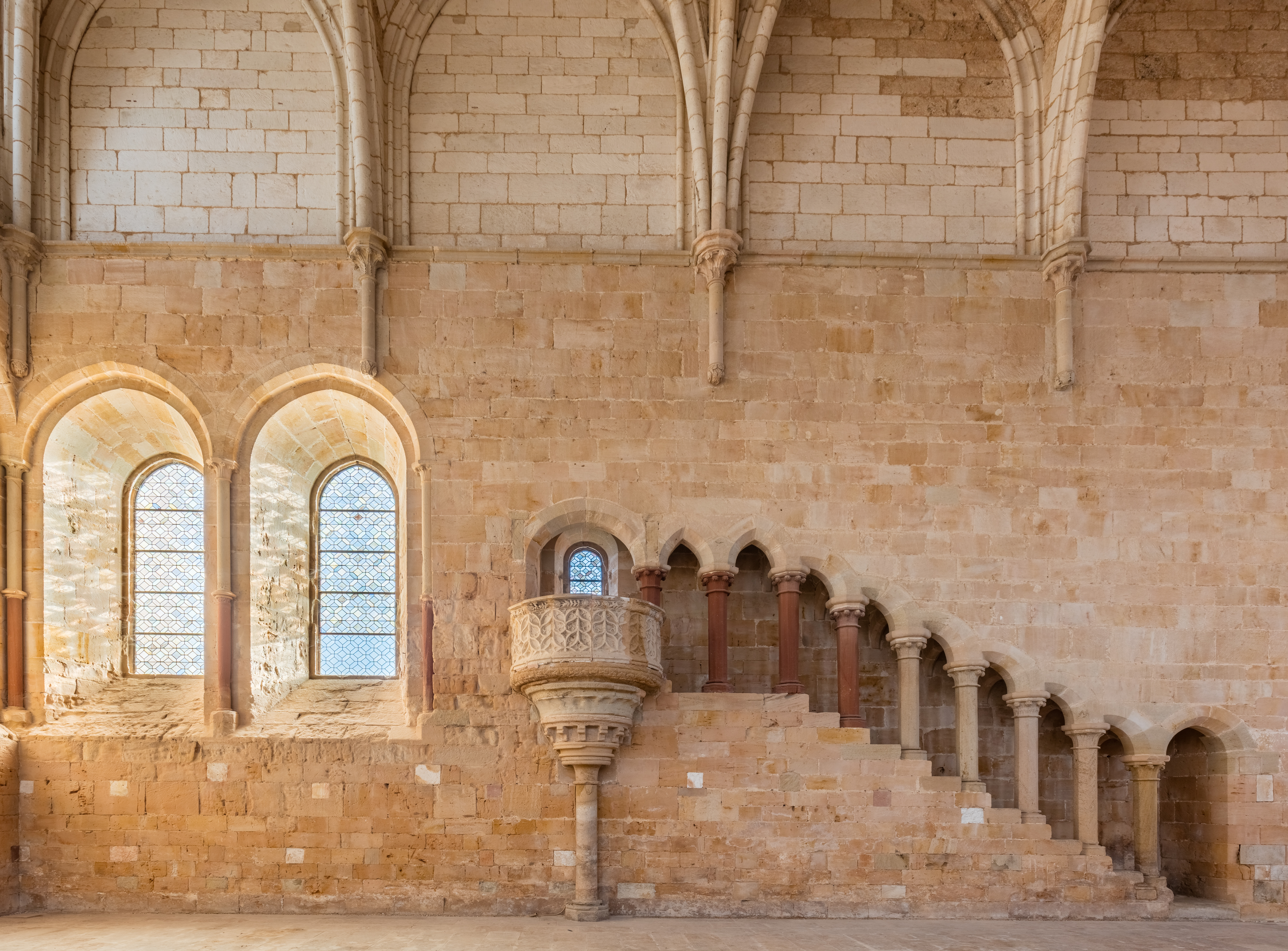
Pulpit of the refectory.
