= Monroy =

- municipality
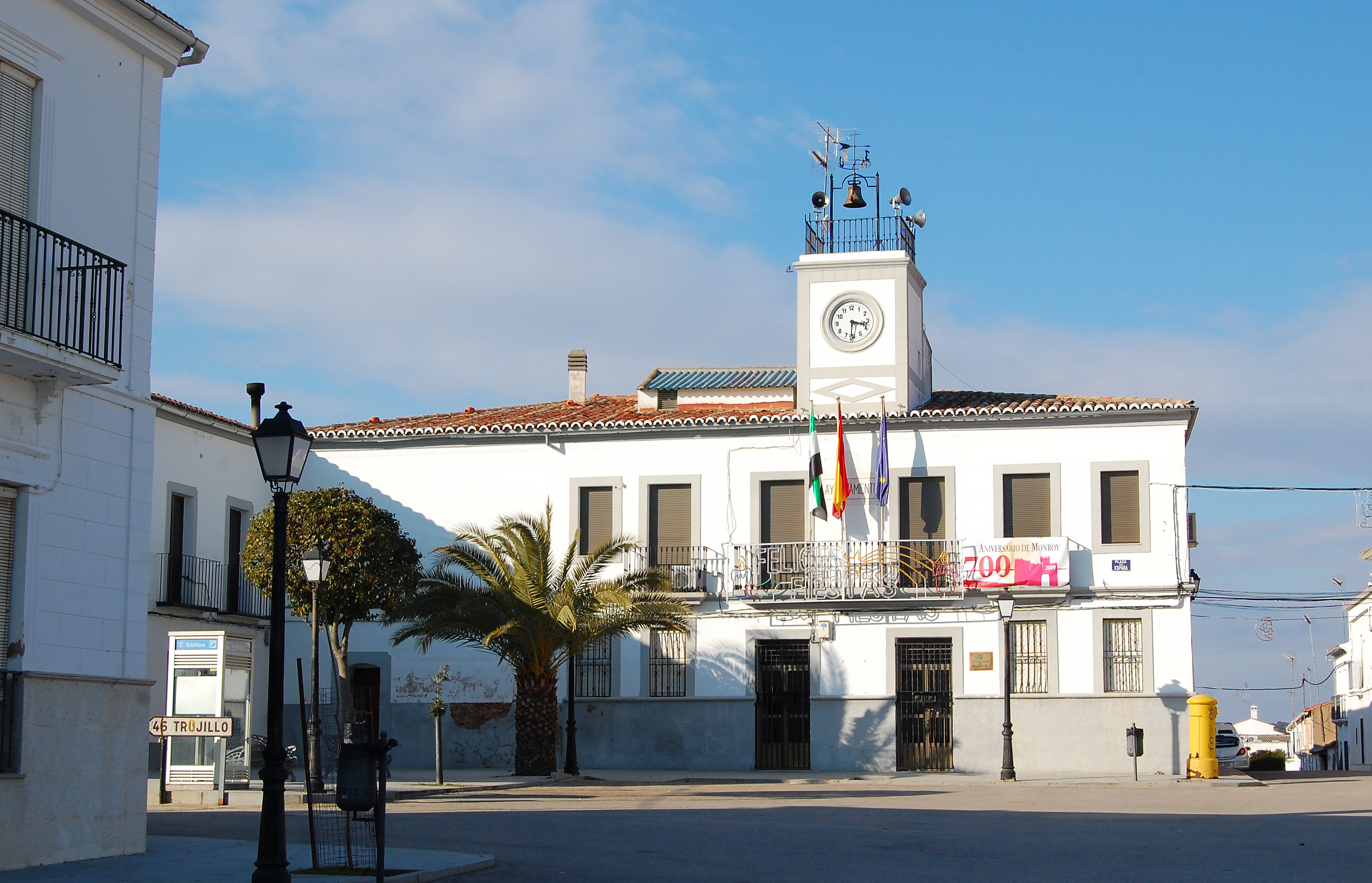
- Town hall

- Coat of arms

- Location in Spain
- Coordinates: 39°38′N 6°12′W
- Country: Spain
- Autonomous community: Extremadura
- Province: Cáceres
- Comarca: Tajo-Salor

Government
  - Mayor: Telesforo Jiménez

Area
  - Total: 204.45 km^{2} (78.94 sq mi)
- Elevation: 378 m (1,240 ft)

Population (2025-01-01)
  - Total: 909
  - Density: 4.45/km^{2} (11.5/sq mi)
- Demonym: Monroyegos
- Time zone: UTC+1 (CET)
  - Summer (DST): UTC+2 (CEST)

Monroy is a municipality located in the province of Cáceres, Extremadura, Spain.

It is located near the Monfragüe National Park.

== See also ==
- List of municipalities in Cáceres
