= Calatorao =

- municipality
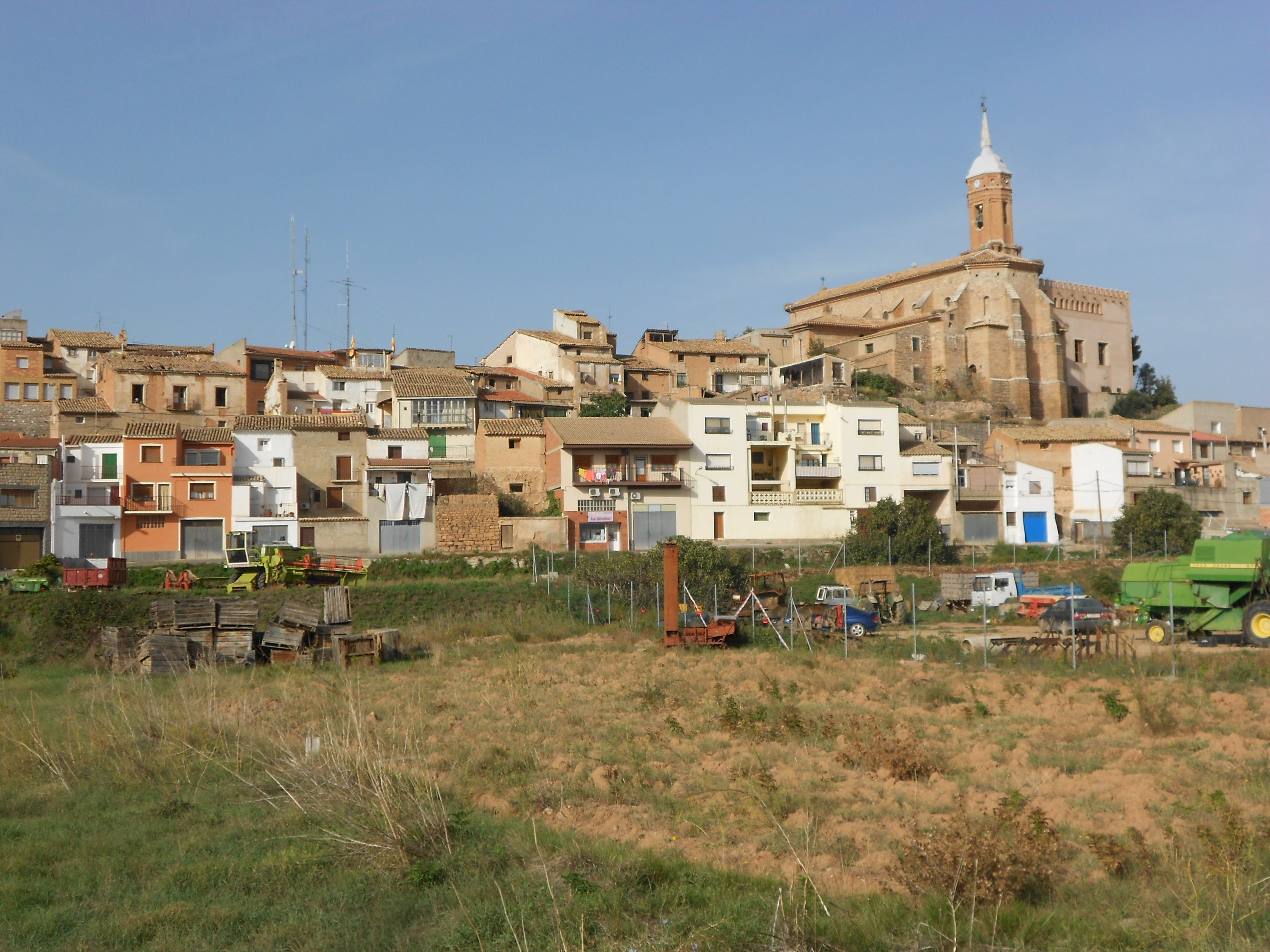

- Flag Coat of arms

- Location in Spain. Calatorao (Spain) Calatorao (Europe)
- Country: Spain
- Autonomous community: Aragon
- Province: Zaragoza
- Municipality: Calatorao

Area
  - Total: 48 km^{2} (19 sq mi)

Population (2025-01-01)
  - Total: 2,970
  - Density: 62/km^{2} (160/sq mi)
- Time zone: UTC+1 (CET)
  - Summer (DST): UTC+2 (CEST)

Calatorao is a municipality located in the province of Zaragoza, Aragon, Spain. According to the 2004 census (INE), the municipality has a population of 3,013 inhabitants.

== See also ==
- List of municipalities in Zaragoza
