= Fuentelmonge =

- Municipality
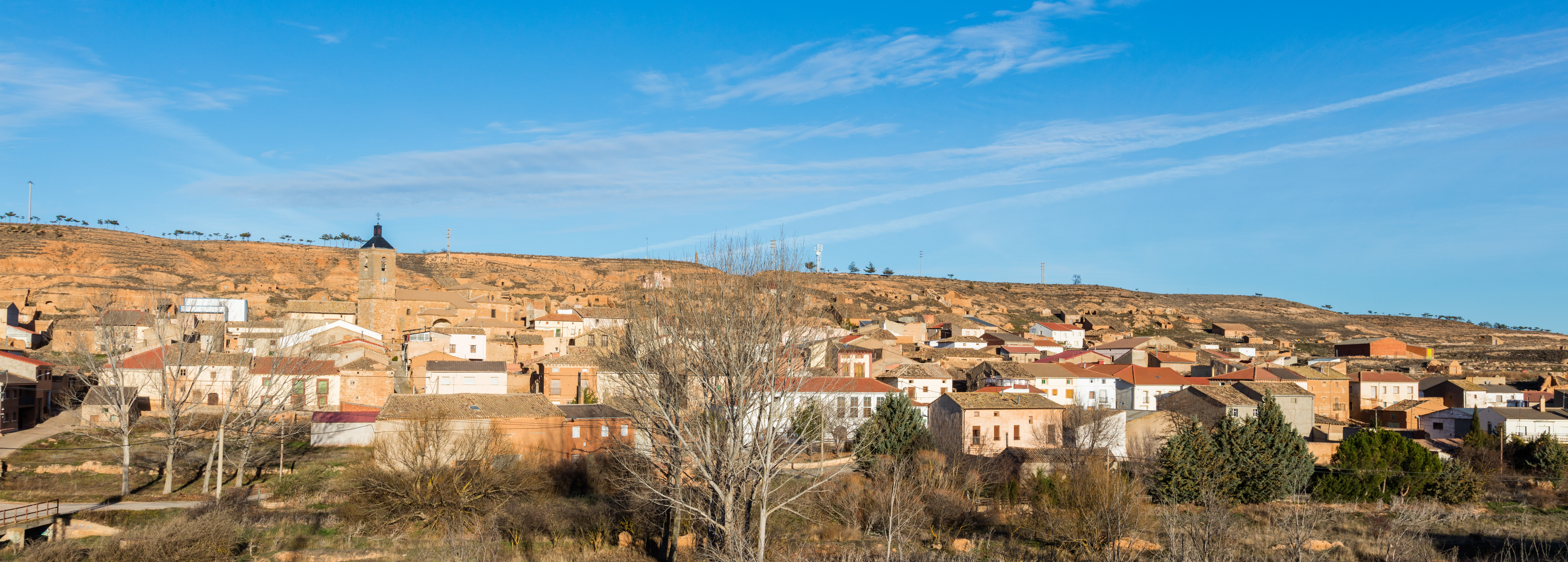
- View of Fuentelmonge

- Location in Spain. Fuentelmonge (Spain)
- Coordinates: 41°25′13″N 2°11′10″W
- Country: Spain
- Autonomous community: Castile and León
- Province: Soria
- Municipality: Fuentelmonge

Area
  - Total: 42 km^{2} (16 sq mi)
- Elevation: 866 m (2,841 ft)

Population (2025-01-01)
  - Total: 58
  - Density: 1.4/km^{2} (3.6/sq mi)
- Time zone: UTC+1 (CET)
  - Summer (DST): UTC+2 (CEST)
- Website: Official website

Fuentelmonge is a municipality located in the province of Soria, Castile and León, Spain. According to the 2004 census (INE), the municipality has a population of 117 inhabitants.
