= Escuelas Pías de San Fernando =

- Escuelas Pías de San Fernando (Spanish)
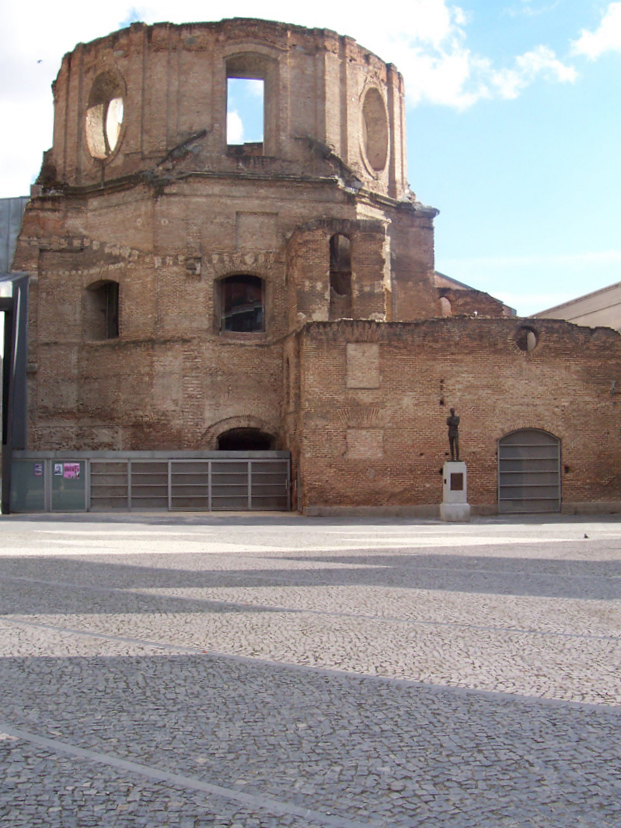

- Location within Spain
- 40.40791°N 3.703338°W
- Location: Madrid, Spain

History
- Built: 18th century

Site notes
- Architectural style: baroque

Spanish Cultural Heritage
- Official name: Escuelas Pías de San Fernando
- Type: Non-movable
- Criteria: Monument
- Designated: 1996
- Reference no.: RI-51-0009577

The Escuelas Pías de San Fernando is a building located in Madrid, Spain. It was formerly a church that burned down during the Spanish Civil War. The ruins have been converted into a UNED university library. It was declared Bien de Interés Cultural in 1996.

== Territorial Framework ==
The Escuelas Pías de San Fernando are located in Madrid's Lavapiés neighborhood, at the corner of Calle del Mesón de Paredes and Calle del Tribulete. The intervention to transform it into a library and lecture hall for the UNED had to take into account the urban and environmental surroundings.

The complex is just 150 meters from Ronda de Valencia, meaning it is exposed to constant vibrations from road traffic and the metro (which is less than 200 meters away). Because of this, monitoring systems had to be installed to detect cracks. Additionally, Madrid's subsoil is clay-based with high expansive capacity depending on moisture levels, so the foundations had to be reinforced during the renovation.

Madrid has a continental Mediterranean climate, with cold winters (temperatures can drop to -5 °C) and extremely hot summers (reaching up to 40 °C). This affects the stress on the building's materials, and—combined with the low humidity and high pollution levels in the area—has accelerated the degradation of materials such as Colmenar stone and the formation of black crusts on brick walls.

Moreover, the Lavapiés neighborhood intensifies the urban heat island effect, with temperatures up to 4 °C higher than in nearby green areas.

== Historical Framework ==
Both the school and the church of the Escuelas Pías de San Fernando originated from the Colegio de San Fernando (also known as Colegio de Lavapiés), founded in 1729. The number of students gradually increased, and in 1734, the land was granted to the Piarist Fathers, making it one of the first schools of this order in Madrid.

After this, the school underwent several expansions, with the most significant one taking place in 1763. Later, the school received financial support from kings Ferdinand VI, Charles III, and Charles IV to fund further expansions and the construction of a new church.

In 1795, Spain's first school for the deaf and mute was established here, but in 1808, the religious community was dissolved, and teaching activities ceased. In 1814, it became an educational institution for underprivileged classes.

In 1936, following the outbreak of the Civil War, the school and convent were looted and burned down. Only the ruins of the church remained standing—the facade, parts of the walls, the transept with the dome's drum, and some decorative elements. After these events, the block became fragmented, and over the next three decades, new buildings were constructed on the site, including a market, a cinema, and a nightclub.

The rest of the complex remained abandoned and in ruins for sixty years after the Civil War. During this time, minor interventions took place, such as the 1973 stabilization of the ruins in an attempt to turn the area into a landscaped square. In 1987, the Madrid City Council purchased the complex, but this only worsened its deterioration and neglect. By 1993, some of the structures were demolished, leaving only parts of the perimeter walls, the transept with the dome's drum, remnants of Baroque decoration, and the main facade.

In 1996, the site was declared a Bien de Interés Cultural (Heritage of Cultural Interest), though by then, it had already become a shelter for homeless people.

That same year, a competition was announced to build a concert hall in the church ruins and a sports complex on the plot across the street. However, it was later decided to use the corner of Calle Tribulete and Mesón de Paredes instead, avoiding the eviction of residents in the neighboring building and creating a unified complex with the existing ruins. Ultimately, the City Council decided to establish a library in the church and lecture halls in the remaining area. As a result, restoration work began in 1999.

== Legal Framework ==
The intervention at Escuelas Pías de San Fernando was shaped by various regulations to balance heritage preservation with functional needs. As a listed Cultural Heritage Site (Bien de Interés Cultural) with comprehensive structural protection, any modifications required authorization from the Directorate-General for Cultural Heritage. This ensured the preservation of all 22 original window openings with their wrought-iron grilles on the main facade, while allowing steel skylights in interior courtyards under strict conditions.

The Lavapiés Special Urban Development Plan imposed key restrictions: a maximum building height of 18.5 meters, preservation of the neighborhood's characteristic "corrala" (Madrid-style tenement) typology, and mandatory retention of cultural use for the property. Additionally, the project had to comply with Spain's Technical Building Code, European accessibility standards for libraries, and international document storage regulations requiring controlled humidity levels.

The intervention process faced controversies, including a legal challenge against the glass structure in the main courtyard. However, courts approved it as a reversible intervention, setting a precedent for future heritage projects in Madrid. This judicial decision became significant for subsequent interventions in the city's historic buildings.

== Restoration Intervention ==
The Escuelas Pías were in a state of consolidated ruin, but due to years of abandonment, they had become severely deteriorated. As mentioned before, some main elements of the building still remained, including parts of the perimeter walls built with "Roman-style" brickwork, which helped them survive both the 1936 fire and over sixty years of neglect.

The transept and the drum of the dome (without the dome itself) were also preserved, allowing plenty of natural light to enter. Additionally, the facade and some remains of the original decoration were still intact.

The restoration project of the Escuelas Pías de San Fernando in Madrid was designed by the Spanish architect José Ignacio Linazasoro, together with Ricardo Sánchez. It was carried out to be compatible with the existing structure and had a strong focus on working with historical heritage.

The new construction and the ruins were integrated to form a unified whole, balancing functionality with authenticity. The project respected the historical value of the complex, the intervention also honored principles of historicity and compatibility, carrying out a restoration without any historical falsification. The design clearly distinguished between old and new elements, as well as the materials used. Remains that were taken out during the process were displayed, along with photographs, plans, and documents about the restoration work.

The intervention never aimed to reconstruct any lost elements—it only restored the ruins and transformed them into a support for new architecture, coexisting peacefully and complementarily with the old structure. The result is a complex where the preexisting brick and stone remains contrast with the concrete and wood of the new construction, maintaining and even enhancing the romantic atmosphere of the Escuelas Pías.

This intervention extended from the urban scale of public space down to the design of interior furniture, creating a unified whole through the use of textures, materials, and light. The lecture halls, the church, and the underground parking beneath the plaza are connected through a play of similarity and contrast.

The plaza acts as a kind of entrance to the school and solves a two-level height difference, adapting to the topography. It is an expressive space, highlighted by the main staircase, which receives overhead light from fifteen meters above. There is no clear separation between the plaza and the interior of the library—both spaces are unified by an entrance hall and lobby that use the same flooring as the plaza.

The main objectives of the intervention in the church were:

· Using wood as a link between the old and new architecture. It covers the nave and the new side section with lattice vaults, filtering the light that enters the space.

· Preserving the open and fractured appearance of the dome drum, keeping it as a landmark and a reminder of the past, while the new dome remains hidden from the outside.

· Treating the window frames so that they are recessed within the openings without touching the walls. The glass in the large historic openings faces outward, allowing views of the church from the plaza without revealing the modern intervention.

· Reusing 1970s granite slabs and combining them with the plaza's cobblestones to fill empty spaces.

· Introducing natural light and a carefully designed artificial lighting system to blur boundaries.

For the lecture halls, the goals were:

· Using cobblestone in lobbies and roofs.

· Removing false ceilings.

· Installing simpler light fixtures to reduce costs while maintaining authenticity.

The building's monumental character was altered by changes in interior circulation, shifting the perception of the central axis. The connection between old and new is marked by a concrete staircase that visually links both eras.

The interior space is illuminated by natural light from the dome drum openings and ground-level entrances, but the most notable feature is the soft light filtering through the edges of the nave vault and the dome skylight. The artificial lighting was specially designed for the building, focusing on simplicity and practicality while highlighting the materials. The hanging lamps are placed at 2.30 meters, creating a human scale that encourages focus and reflection.

One detail that visitors might not notice is the removal of surviving plaster, stucco, paintings, and moldings that had endured after the fire and over time. This decision was made to achieve a purer ruin aesthetic, which, although it may contradict some restoration principles mentioned earlier, aligns better with the overall vision of the project.

Looking at the exterior, there is a clear dialogue between the old and new facades, connected through material continuity and slight variations in color and construction logic. The new library facade mimics the old masonry and incorporates fragments of an ancient doorway as a display piece.

The original concept remains largely unchanged, resulting in a complex known primarily for its lecture halls but especially for its library, which has become its main function

Originally, the church space that was converted into a library did not meet the necessary functional requirements—it had overly large spaces, poor natural lighting, heights and materials that caused sound reverberation, accessibility issues, and complicated circulation for users, staff, and materials. However, the intervention successfully adapted the space to make it fully functional.

== Bibliografía ==
- AENOR. (2019). UNE 153010:2019 Accessibility. ISBN 978-84-8143-922-4.
- Arquitectura Viva. (n.d.). Library and lecture hall of the UNED in the Escuelas Pías de San Fernando.
- Astor Cordes, L. (2018). Rebirth among ruins: Escuelas Pías Cultural Center [Undergraduate thesis, ETSAM].
- Ayuntamiento de Madrid. (2023). Air quality report in Centro.
- Comunidad de Madrid. (2003, March 15). Resolución DGPC 12/2003 sobre intervenciones [BOCM 15/03/2003].
- Herránz Durández, L. (2017). Library and lecture hall of the UNED in the former Escuelas Pías de San Fernando in Madrid: Analysis and critique of its intervention [History and theory of intervention 1, Academic year 2016-2017].
- ITG. (2002). Geotechnical study of the site [Ref. 5678/02].
- TSJM. (2006). Judgment 567/2006, Contentious-Administrative Chamber.
- UNED. (2005). Technical rehabilitation report (pp. 23–45). [Available at UNED Central Library].
- Vegazo Sancho, S. (n.d.). Restoration monitoring: Before, during and after. The compatibility of use with the fundamental values of the building [Academic work, AULA 2]. (S. Mora Alonso-Muñoyerro, Tutor).
