= Santa María de Huerta =

- Municipality
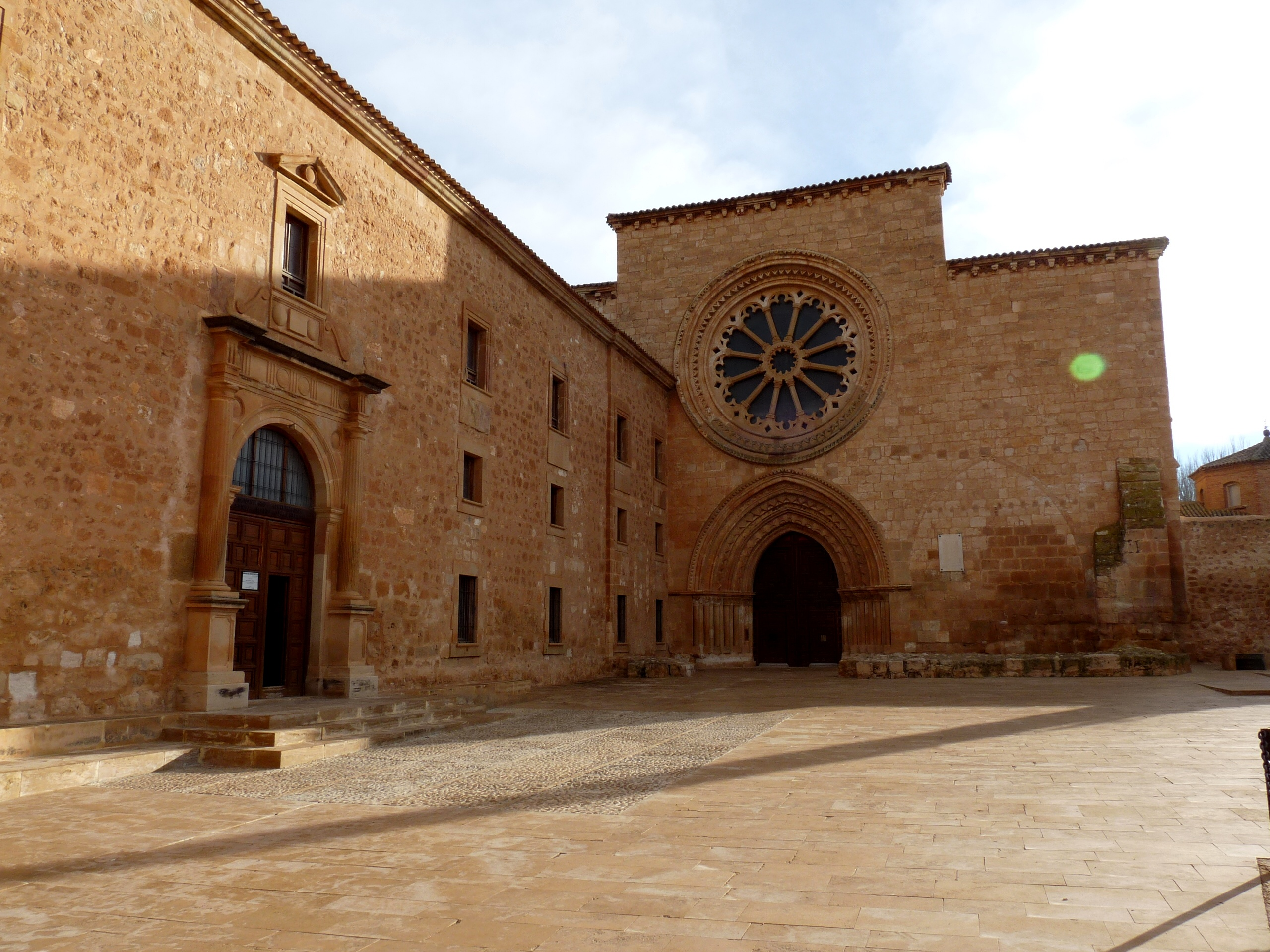
- Monasterio de Santa María de Huerta

- Coat of arms

- Location in Spain. Santa María de Huerta (Spain)
- Coordinates: 41°15′53″N 2°10′33″W
- Country: Spain
- Autonomous Community: Castile and León
- Province: Soria
- Comarca: Campo de Gómara

Government
  - Type: Mayor-council government
  - Body: Ayuntamiento de Santa María de Huerta
  - Mayor: Mercedes Aguilar Medina (2015) (AISMH)

Area
  - Total: 49.15 km^{2} (18.98 sq mi)
- Elevation: 762 m (2,500 ft)

Population (2025-01-01)
  - Total: 239
  - Density: 4.86/km^{2} (12.6/sq mi)
- Demonym(s): Hortense, -sa (es)
- Time zone: CET (GMT +1)
  - Summer (DST): CEST (GMT +2)
- Postcode: 42260
- Website: Official website

Santa María de Huerta is a municipality located in the Campo de Gómara comarca, Province of Soria, Castile and León, Spain beside the A2 autopista and close to the border with Aragon. According to the 2004 census (INE), the municipality had a population of 419 inhabitants.

The village contains the Cistercian monastery of Santa María de Huerta.
