= 1682 in art =

Events from the year 1682 in art.

== Events ==
- (unknown)

== Works ==
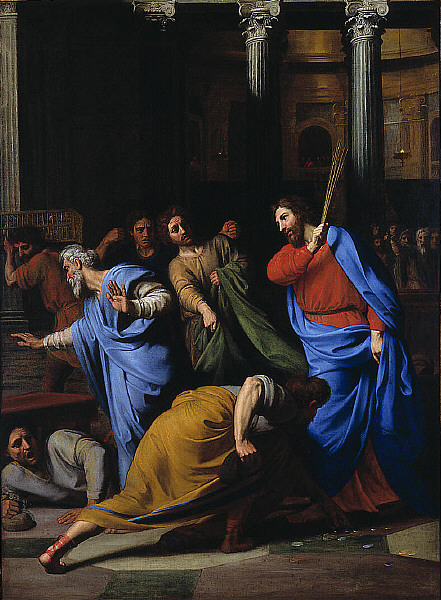
Nicolas Colombel – Christ Expelling the Money-Changers from the Temple, Saint Louis Art Museum

- Thomas Cartwright - Statue of Edward VI (St Thomas' Hospital, London)
- Nicolas Colombel - Christ Expelling the Money-Changers from the Temple
- Luca Giordano - The Judgement of Paris (approximate date)
- Godfrey Kneller - Portrait of Anne, Duchess of Hamilton
- Claude Lorrain – Ascanius Shooting the Stag of Sylvia
- John Riley – Portrait of Elias Ashmole

== Births ==
- February 13 – Giovanni Battista Piazzetta, Italian rococo painter (died 1754)
- April 15 – Jan van Huysum, Dutch painter (died 1749)
- May 27 - Bernard Lens III, English artist known primarily for his portrait miniatures (died 1740)
- August 15 - Annibale Albani, Italian Cardinal, whose library, gallery of paintings/sculpture, and cabinet of coins were added to the Vatican collection (died 1751)
- October 24 - William Aikman (painter), Scottish portrait-painter (died 1731)
- date unknown
  - Giacomo Adolfi, Italian painter, active in and around Bergamo (died 1741)
  - Jacopo Amigoni, Italian painter known for mythological figures and religious artifacts, best known for his initial work in Venice (died 1752)
  - Mosen Vicente Bru, Spanish painter (died 1703)
  - Margareta Capsia, Finnish painter (died 1759)
  - Claude Du Bosc, French engraver (died 1745)
  - Jean Charles Flipart, French engraver (died 1751)
  - Girolamo Gatti, Italian painter (died 1726)
  - Gustavus Hesselius, Swedish-American painter (died 1755)
  - Hua Yan, Chinese painter from Fujian province (died 1756)
  - Isabel Jolís Oliver, Spanish printer and engraver (died 1770)
  - Giovanni Domenico Lombardi, Italian painter in Lucca (died 1751)
  - Kaspar Anton von Baroni-Cavalcabo, Italian painter (died 1759)
  - Alexey Zubov, Russian etcher (died 1741)
- probable
  - Shen Quan, Chinese painter during the Qing Dynasty (died 1760)
  - John Wootton, English painter of sporting subjects, battle scenes and landscapes (died 1764)

== Deaths ==
- January 13 - Francesco Cozza, Italian painter (born 1605)
- February 2 - Jean Le Pautre, French designer and engraver (born 1618)
- March 14 - Jacob Isaakszoon van Ruisdael, celebrated Dutch landscape painter (born 1628)
- April 3 - Bartolomé Esteban Murillo, Spanish painter (born 1617)
- May 23 - Abraham Wuchters, Dutch-Danish painter and engraver (born 1608)
- November 23 - Claude Lorrain, French landscape painter (born c.1600)
- date unknown
  - Niccolò Berrettoni, Italian painter (born 1637)
  - Jacopo Baccarini, Italian painter of the Baroque period born in Reggio (born 1605)
  - Pieter Janssens Elinga, Dutch painter (born 1623)
  - Giacinto de Popoli, Italian painter active near his native city of Orta (b. unknown)
  - Urbano Romanelli, Italian painter in Rome and in churches at Velletri (born 1645)
