= Giacinto =

Giacinto (pronounced [dʒaˈtʃinto]) is a masculine Italian given name, equivalent to English Hyacinth or Hyacinthe. Notable people with the name include:

- Giacinto Achilli (1803–1860), Italian Roman Catholic discharged from the priesthood for sexual misconduct
- Giacinto Allegrini (born 1989), Italian football player
- Giacinto Artale (1906–1970), Italian politician
- Giacinto Auriti (1923–2006), Italian lawyer, essayist and politician
- Giulio Giacinto Avellino (1645–1700), Italian painter
- Angelo Giacinto Banchero (1744–1793), Italian painter
- Giacinto Bellini (fl. 17th century), Italian painter
- Giacinto of Belmonte (1839–1899), Italian Roman Catholic monk, priest and writer
- Giacinto Berloco (born 1941), Italian Roman Catholic prelate
- Giacinto Bobone Orsini (c. 1106–1198), later Pope Celestine III
- Giacinto Boccanera (1666–1746), Italian painter
- Giacinto Bondioli (1596–1636), Italian Dominican prior and composer
- Giacinto Bosco (1905–1997), Italian jurist, academic and politician
- Giacinto Brandi (1621–1691), Italian painter
- Giacinto Calandrucci (1646–1707), Italian painter
- Giacinto Campana (c. 1600–?), Italian painter
- Giacinto Carini (1821–1880), Italian politician and patriot
- Giacinto Cestoni (1637–1718), Italian naturalist
- Giacinto Gaetano Chiurlia (1659–1730), Italian Roman Catholic prelate
- Giacinto Andrea Cicognini (1606–1651), Italian playwright and librettist
- Giacinto Collegno (1793–1856), Italian patriot of the Risorgimento period
- Giacinto Maria Conigli (1621–1704), Italian Roman Catholic prelate
- Giacinto De Cassan (1917–1999), Italian cross-country skier
- Giacinto della Calce (1649–1715), Italian Roman Catholic prelate
- Giacinto de Popoli (died 1682), Italian painter
- Giacinto de' Sivo (1814–1867), Italian politician, historian and journalist
- Giacinto Diano (1731–1803), Italian painter
- Giacinto Dragonetti (1738–1818), Italian jurist and writer
- Giacinto Fabbroni (fl. 18th century), Italian painter
- Giacinto Facchetti (1942–2006), Italian football player
- Giacinto Ferrero (1862–1922), Italian general
- Giacinto Fontana (1692–1739), Italian castrato singer
- Giacinto Gaggia (1847–1933), Italian Roman Catholic prelate
- Giacinto Garofalini (1661–1723), Italian painter
- Giacinto Geronimo de Espinosa (1600–1680), Spanish painter
- Giacinto Ghia (1887–1944), Italian automobile coachbuilder
- Giacinto Gigante (1806–1876), Italian painter
- Giacinto Gilioli (1594–1665), Italian painter
- Giacinto Gimignani (1606–1681), Italian painter
- Giacinto Lambiasi (1896–?), Italian pole vaulter
- Giacinto Longhin (1863–1936), Italian Roman Catholic prelate
- Giacinto Macripodari (c. 1610–1672), Greek scholar and Dominican friar
- Giacinto Camillo Maradei (1636–1705), Italian Roman Catholic prelate
- Giacinto-Boulos Marcuzzo (born 1945), Italian Roman Catholic prelate
- Giacinto Marras (1810–1883), Italian singer and musical composer
- Giacinto Martorelli (1855–1917), Italian ornithologist and bird artist
- Giacinto Menotti Serrati (1874–1926), Italian politician
- Giacinto Mondaini (1903–1979), Italian painter, humorist, cartoonist, illustrator and screenwriter
- Giacinto Morera (1856–1909), Italian mathematician
- Giuseppe Giacinto Moris (1796–1869), Italian botanist
- Mario Giacinto Peracca (1861–1923), Italian herpetologist
- Giacinto Platania (c. 1612–1691), Italian painter
- Giacinto Prandelli (1914–2010), Italian operatic tenor
- Benedetto Giacinto Sangermano (1638–1702), Italian Roman Catholic prelate
- Giacinto Santambrogio (1945–2012), Italian professional road bicycle racer
- Giovanni Giacinto Sbaraglia (1687–1764), Italian Franciscan friar and historian
- Angelo Giacinto Scapardini (1861–1937), Italian Roman Catholic prelate
- Giacinto Scelsi (1905–1988), Italian composer who also wrote surrealist poetry in French
- Giacinto Scoles (born 1935), Italian-American chemist and physicist
- Giacinto Sertorelli (1914–1938), Italian alpine skier
- Giacinto Urso (1925–2024), Italian politician
- Danilo Giacinto Ventola (born 2000), Italian football player
- Giovanni Giacinto Vogli (1697–1762), Italian physician and writer
- Giacinto Placido Zurla (1769–1843), Italian Roman Catholic prelate and writer on medieval geography
