= House of Bonzi =

Italian noble family

Bonzi
- Noble house
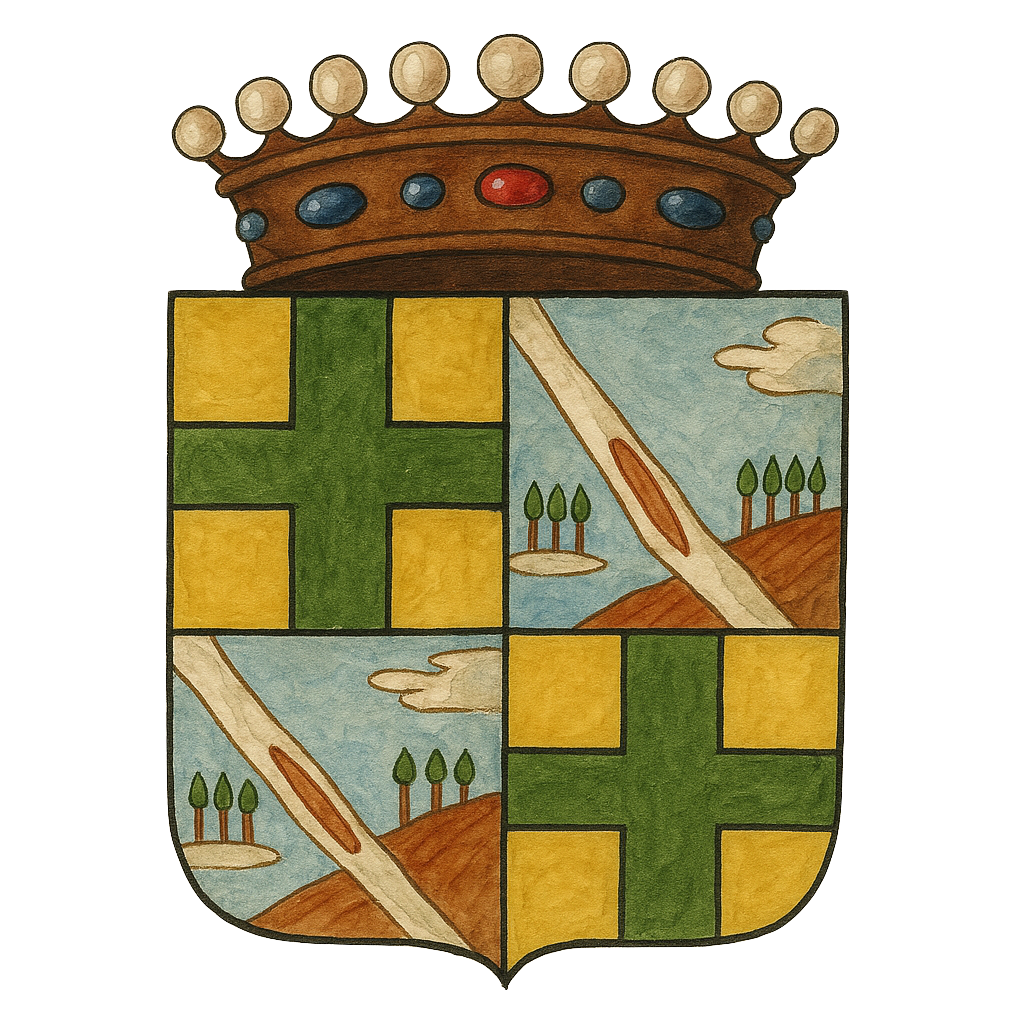
- Country: Italy
- Current region: Lombardy
- Origin: Crema
- Founded: 1448
- Founder: Fachino Bonzi
- Titles: Count of the Serio; Noble
- Cadet branches: Bonzi of San Michele

The House of Bonzi is a noble Italian family originating from Crema, Italy. The family rose to prominence thanks to the services rendered to the Republic of Venice during the conquest of Crema in 1449, as part of the Italian Wars of the 15th century.

In recognition of their merits, the family was granted noble status as Counts by Venice and received feudal jurisdiction over the Serio River. In addition to their presence in Crema, the Bonzi also established themselves in the cities of Milan and Bergamo, further expanding into the United States and Argentina in later centuries.

In 1897, by a ruling of the Court of Crema, the surname was officially changed from Bonzio to Bonzi.

== History ==
=== Origins ===
The name Bonzi first appears in Crema's history with Fachino Bonzi (1448), during the conflicts between the Republic of Venice and the Duchy of Milan. According to one theory, he may have belonged to a cadet branch of the Venetian patrician family Bonzi (or Bonzio, or Boncio), originally ancient tribunes in Trieste who moved to Venice in 868 and gained full patrician status in 1297. The Bonzi held various high offices in the 14th and 15th centuries, including senator, consul, podestà and captain, before becoming extinct in 1509.

Supporting arguments:

- Origin of the surname – not native to Crema, but attested in Venice.
- Heraldry – coat of arms almost identical to that of the patrician Bonzi, a phenomenon unlikely to be coincidental and in heraldry often indicative of cadet branches.
- Language of the ducal decrees – in acts of the Republic of Venice addressed to Fachino, the phrase “meriti degli antiqui della famiglia” (“merits of the forebears of the family”) appears, an expression usually reserved for houses already known to the Republic.
- Social position – Fachino and his son Bernardino owned boats and maintained relationships and alliances with the most prominent families of the city (Benzoni, Robati, Caravaggi), receiving privileges and feudal investitures from Venice.
- Historical context – Before the conquest of Crema (1449), Fachino possessed boats and the means to contribute to military operations, indicating high social status and a relationship of trust with Venice. After the conquest, the ducal decree of 1450 recognised his merits and formalised his settlement in the territory with strategic privileges, in line with the Venetian policy of entrusting key positions to loyal families.

=== Rise in Crema ===
Fachino Bonzi distinguished himself for the support given to the Republic of Venice during the conquest of Crema in 1449, providing boats and logistical assistance for the transport of men, weapons and supplies. In the ducal decree of 28 March 1450, Doge Francesco Foscari recalled how he, “before the conquest of our city of Crema, undertook and sustained many actions… facing any danger… for the honour, the benefit and the exaltation of our State,” had contributed to the operations. For these merits he was granted the exclusive right to fish and navigate on the River Serio for five years, a rare and highly valuable privilege that marked the family's permanent establishment in Crema and consolidated its prestige.

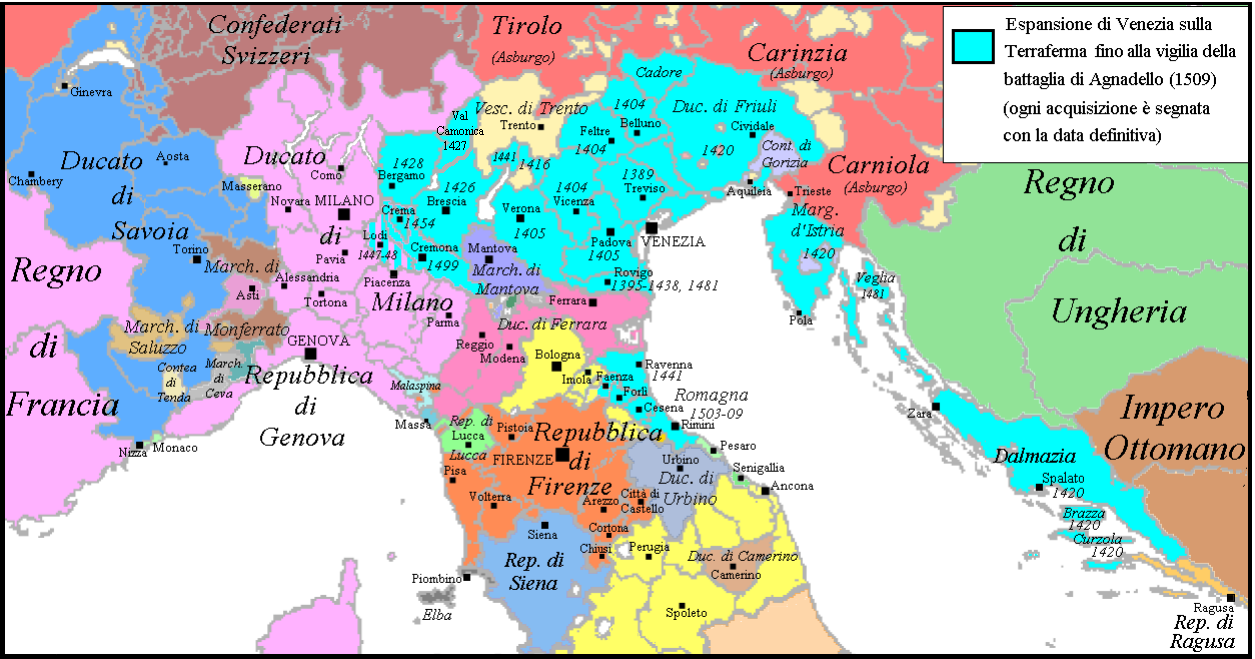
Republic of Venice expansion in Terraferma (16th century)

=== Bernardino Bonzi the League of Cambrai ===
Bernardino Bonzi, son of Fachino, was an important supporter of Venice during the War of the League of Cambrai (1508–1516), a conflict between the major European powers against the Serenissima. Like his father, Bernardino played a key role but was captured and executed by the French for transporting weapons from Milan to Venice. This sacrifice reinforced the symbolic legacy of the family's service to the Republic.

=== The Title of Counts ===
Over the centuries, the unwavering services rendered to the Republic of Venice were rewarded with numerous honors. In 1589, Ercole, grandson of Bernardino, was bestowed the fief of the Serio River, securing exclusive rights to navigate and fish there. However, his successors could not enjoy these privileges peacefully until the family received further confirmation of their rights over the fief and was officially bestowed the title of Count by Doge Silvestro Valier. The concession was confirmed in 1694, in perpetuity, in favor of Giovanni, Bernardino, and Giuseppe. Bernardino married Camilla Zurla, a noblewoman from Crema belonging to the prestigious Zurla family, and was the only one amongst the three to have children.

The family became part of the Noble General Council of the City of Crema in 1738, when Count Ercole Bonzi (son of Bernardino Bonzi) married Valeria Vimercati, a noblewoman from Crema belonging to the prestigious Vimercati family. The couple had three children.

Later, in 1838, the title and fief of Serio were reaffirmed by Emperor Ferdinand I of Austria in Vienna in favor of Leonardo (1826–1864) and Giuseppe (1830–1894).

=== Succession ===
Since the late eighteenth century, spanning the Napoleonic era, the Risorgimento, and the twentieth century, the descendants of the Bonzi family have maintained the privileges granted to them, responding functionally to political, social, and economic transformations while preserving a significant presence in local history.

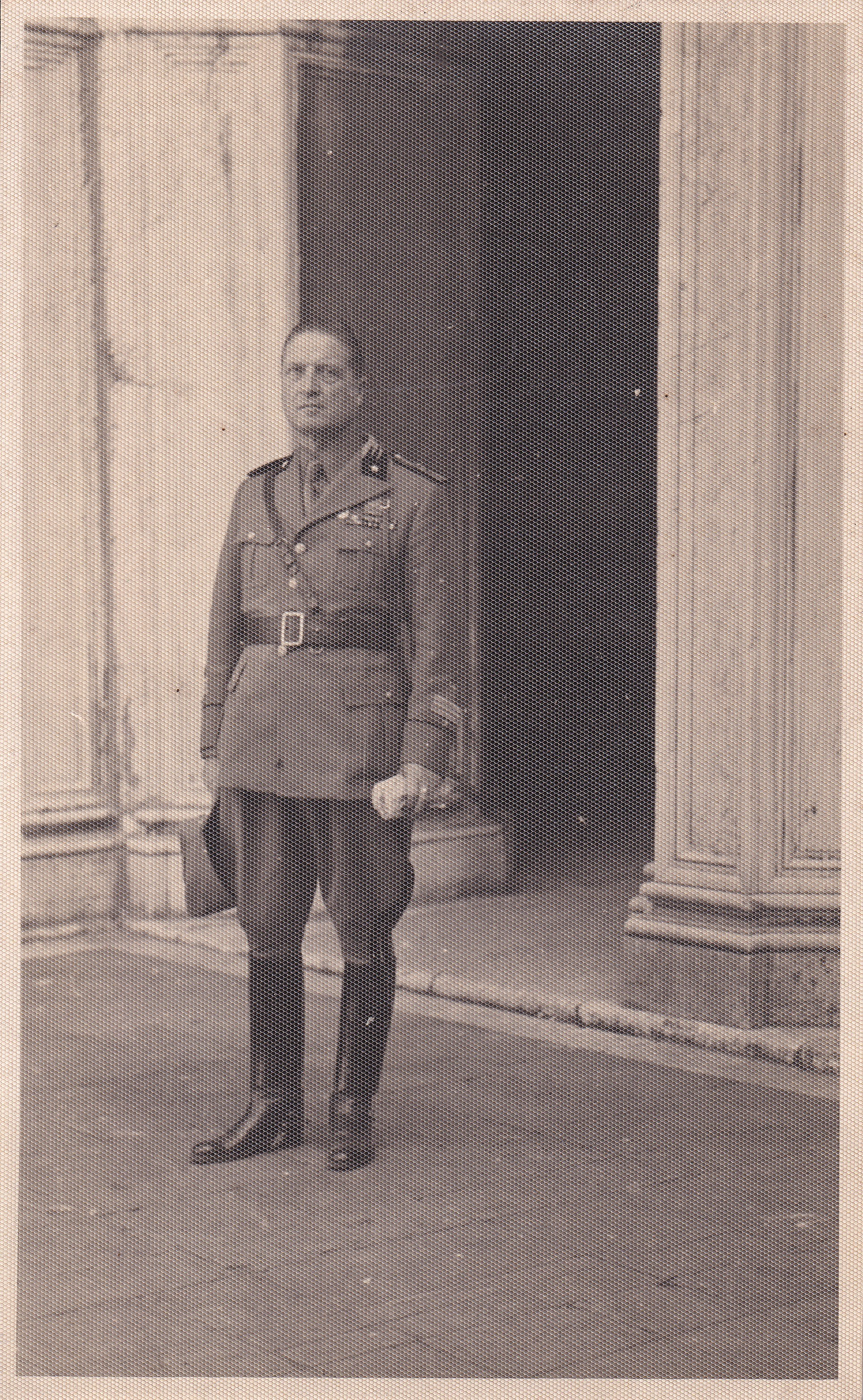
Count Antonio Bonzi Vimercati.

However, during the World wars, poor management and the heavy economic burdens caused by the conflicts led to turbulent times for the main branch of the family. Count Antonio Bonzi Vimercati (1879–1944), son of Count Francesco and the noble woman Luigia (Luisa) Carioni, was the last owner of Villa Bonzi in Ripalta Nuova and of the Bonzi Palace in the center of Crema, which he had inherited from his great uncle Agostino Vimercati.

In contrast, the San Michele cadet branch of the family did not suffer the same fate. In more recent times, some members partially relocated to the Americas and distinguished themselves, particularly with Count Leonardo Bonzi (1902–1977).

Upon the death of Antonio Bonzi Vimercati, the succession passed to his son Gian Franco Bonzi (1902–1975), who in turn transmitted the title to his firstborn son Antonio Bonzi (1930–2001), who moved to Milan, and to his brother Alessandro (1933–2011).

The two brothers, Antonio and Alessandro, are the progenitors of the two branches into which the main branch of the Bonzi family is presently divided. Antonio married Luciana Ceserani (1930), from whom he had:

- Nob. Elena (1962), who married Nob. Ugo Rietmann, of the ancient Swiss patricians of St. Gallen, from whom:
  - Nob. Alessandro (1996).
  - Nob. Cav. Federico (2000).
- Nob. Claudia (1966), who married Mauro Fossati, from whom:
  - Margherita (2000).

Alessandro married Attilia Assolari, from whom:

- Nob. Manila (1965), who married Paolo Marniga
- Co. Leonardo (1975), who married Maria Teresa Paloschi, from whom:
  - Co. Francesco (2006).
  - Nob. Alessandra (2009).

== Relationships and Marriages ==
The Bonzi family further consolidated its status through marriages with other noble and renowned houses. Among these were the Counts Vimercati (to whom they were closely tied), the Marquises Zurla, the Noble Carioni, the Counts Guastaverza, the Noble Albergoni, the Berra, the patrician Rietmann, and in the US, the Makee Spalding.

== Territory and Serio River ==
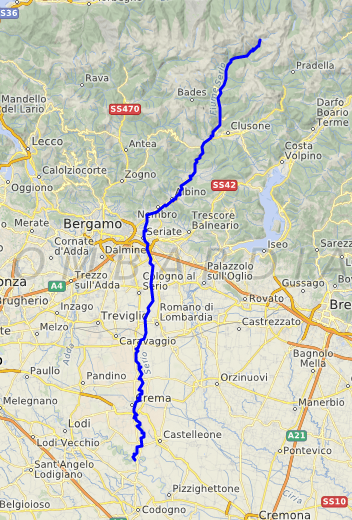
Serio River

The Serio River played a crucial role in the history of the Bonzi family's territory. Located in the heart of Lombardy, the Serio flows through the provinces of Bergamo and Cremona. In the 15th century, the Bonzi family was granted exclusive fishing and navigation rights on this waterway by the Doge of Venice. The concession, dating back to 1450, gave the family complete control over the river's resources from Mozzanica to its mouth at the Adda River. This right made the Serio not only an economic resource through its resources and commercial trade along the Po River and the Venetian Lagoon, but also a symbol of the family's prestige and power in the region.

Along the Serio River, the Bonzi family established a comprehensive territorial management system that included fishing, navigation, and agricultural exploitation, as well as the maintenance of essential infrastructure such as canals and dams for irrigation. Over the centuries, however, the introduction of dams and other barriers along the river's course reduced water flow and drastically diminished fishing opportunities. This change not only depleted natural resources but also threatened the historic privileges of the Bonzi family.

=== Fish Repopulation and Territorial Defense ===
In the late 19th century, the decline in fish populations prompted the Bonzi family to seek solutions for restocking the river. Count Clito Bonzi was among the first to advocate for the purchase of trout fry in an effort to restore fish populations in the Serio.

=== Legal Disputes ===
Conflicts over rights to the river's resources were numerous throughout history. There were several instances of legal disputes between the Bonzi family and local communities, such as those of Mozzanica and Ripalta Vecchia. The Bonzi successfully upheld their rights on multiple occasions, as evidenced by various dogal decrees and court rulings that confirmed their exclusive authority over the territory and the river's resources.

== Cadet Branches ==
The cadet branches of the Bonzi family:

- Bonzi from San Michele
- Bonzi from Pasadena

== Coat of Arms ==
In 1929, the Italian government recognized the title of Count for the male descendants of Count Giuseppe Bonzi and the title of Noble for the descendants of both sexes. The Heraldic Council revised the family coat of arms, introducing new elements such as the comital crown and modifying details of the original design, including the cross, the island, and the decorations. The most significant changes included the use of an open helmet without gold clasps, a nine-pointed crown, and the addition of a standing cherub figure.

== Residences ==
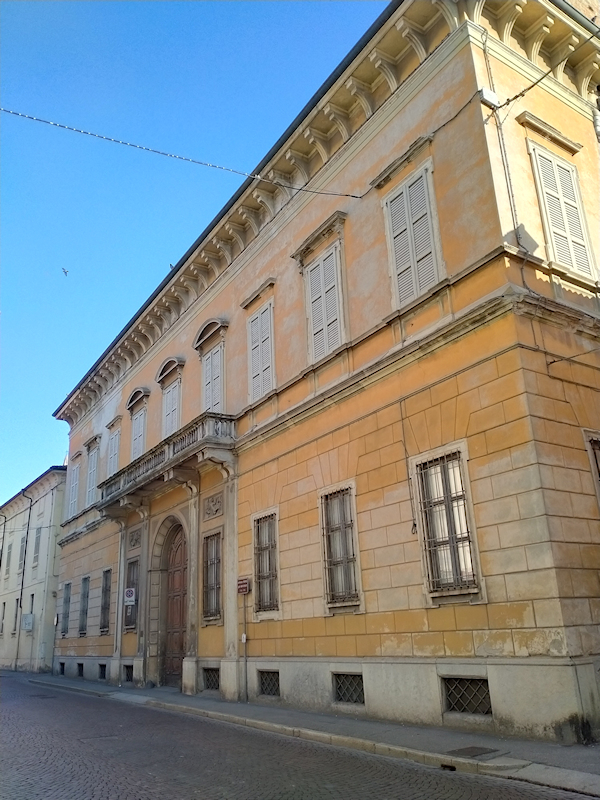
Bonzi Palace in Crema

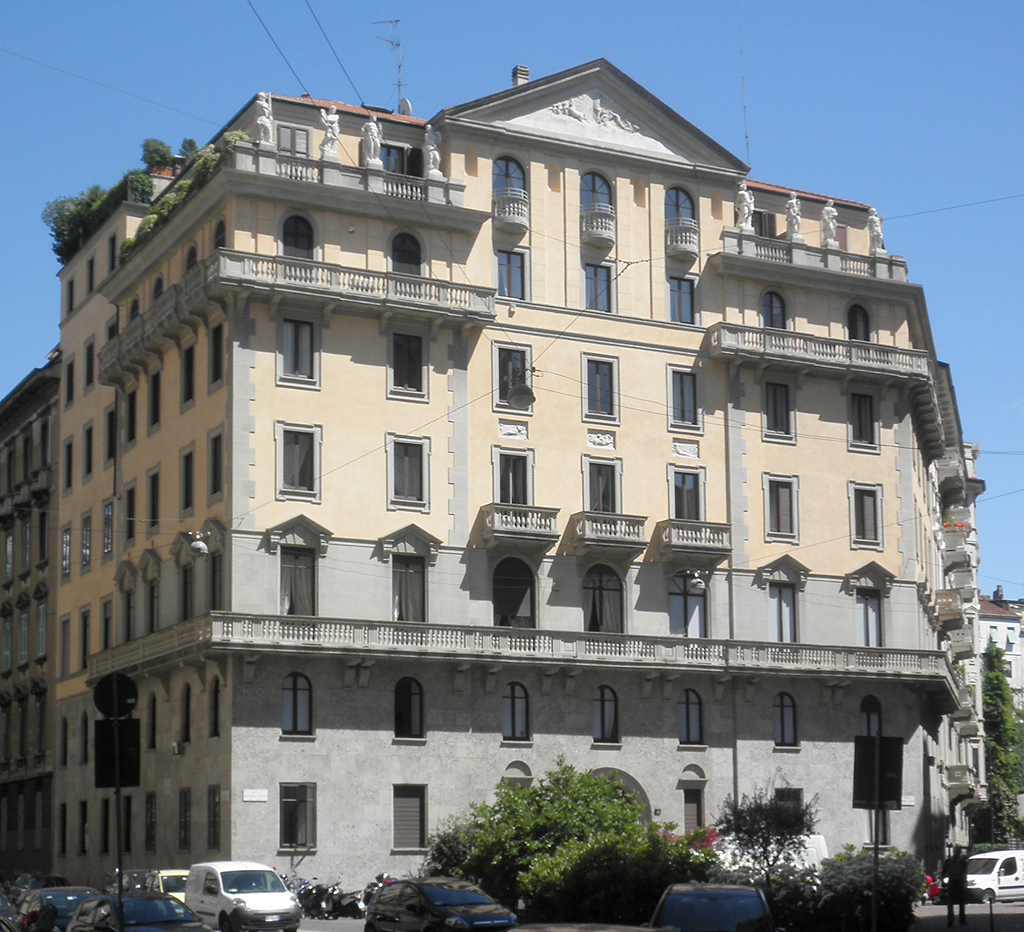
Mansion of Piazza Duse (n. 3) in Milan.

Of the residences built and inhabited by the Bonzi family, the following are particularly notable:

- Palazzo Bonzi in Crema
- Ex Palazzo Bonzi in Crema
- Ex Casa Bonzi of Via Alemanio Fino (n. 3) in Crema
- Villa Bonzi in Ripalta Nuova
- Villa Bonzi in San Michele
- Palazzo of Piazza Duse (n. 3) a Milano

== Family members ==
- Fachino Bonzi (15th century): A boatman who supported Venice during its conflict with Milan and was instrumental for he capture of Crema in 1449. He was granted exclusive rights to the Serio River for his services.
- Bernardino Bonzi (early 16th century): Smuggled weapons for Venice during the League of Cambrai. He was executed for his efforts.
- Count Ercole (†1678): Corporal in the Artillery Corps (Bombardiers) for the Republic of Venice.
- Count Orazio Bonzi (1773–1843): A lawyer who, during the French domination, was part of the Municipality of Crema and participated in the Consulte de Lyon.
- Count Leonardo Bonzi (1785–1841): An officer in the service of the Austrian Empire between 1815 and 1829, he served as an infantry captain in the 23rd Lombard Infantry Regiment (Lombardisches Infanterie-Regiment Nr. 23), a unit with its recruitment center in Lodi and headquarters in Prague. During his garrison years in Bohemia, he married Giuseppa Oliva in Josephstadt, eventually concluding his military career in 1829 with the honorary rank of major.
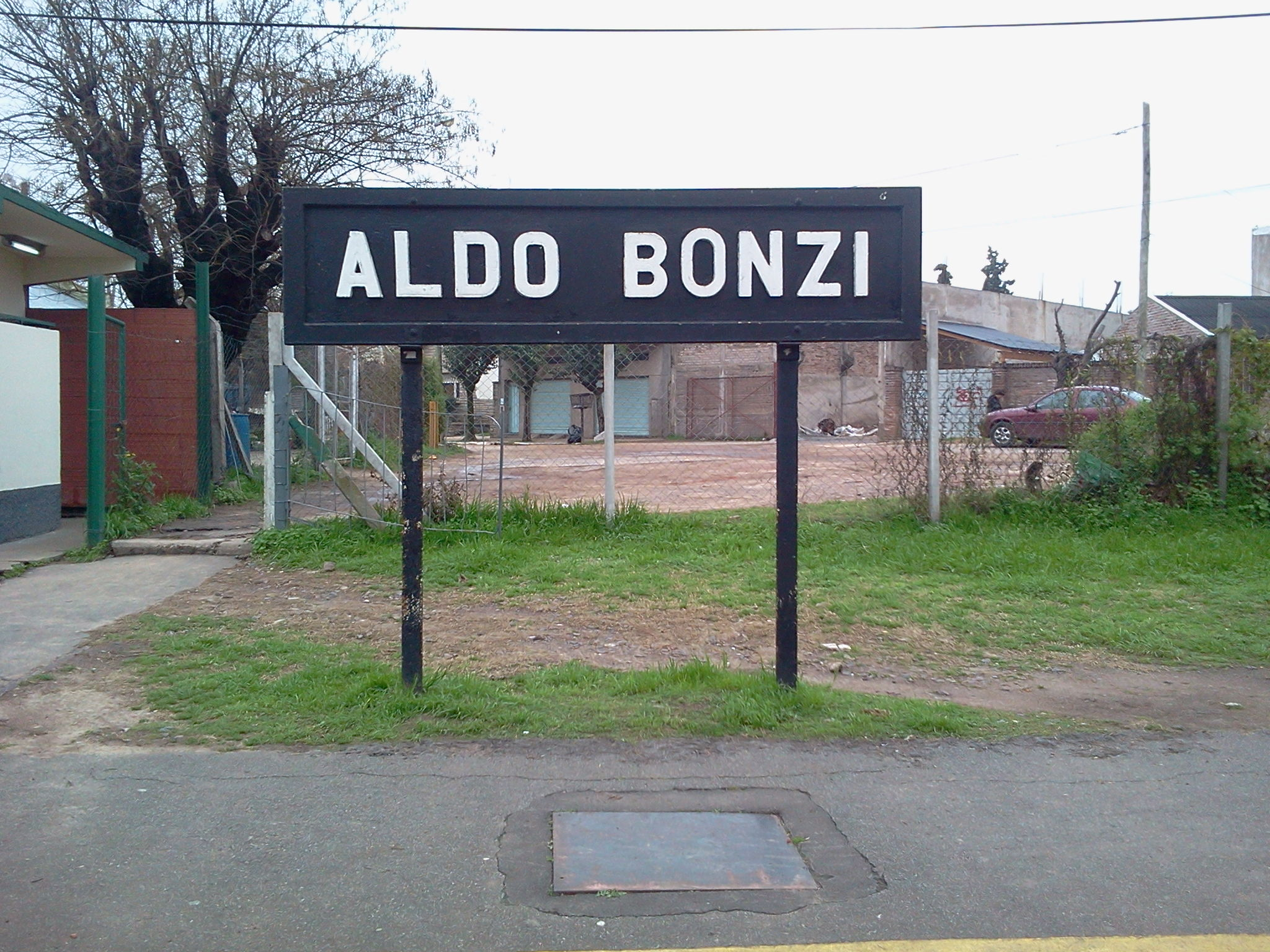
  Sign with the name of the city of Aldo Bonzi
- Count Aldo Bonzi (1852–1935): An entrepreneur who founded the city of Aldo Bonzi in Argentina, marking the family's expansion abroad.
- Count Iro Bonzi (1866–1938): Vice president (1921–1923) of the Milanese football team AC Milan. He married Sarina Nathan Berra (1872–1968), niece of Ernesto Nathan and sister of Edward Nathan.
  Count Ercole Bonzi
- Count Ercole Bonzi (1873–1940): Educated at the Military College of Milan and the Military Academy of Modena, being commissioned as a second lieutenant in the Savoia Cavalleria regiment. He initially served as an aide-de-camp to General Luigi Pelloux, who was then Minister of War, and was subsequently appointed by King Umberto I of Italy as commander of the Royal Corazzieri. He married Alice Makee Spalding (daughter of the industrialist LTC Zephaniah Swift Spalding and granddaughter of James Makee) and settled in Pasadena, California, founding the American branch of the Bonzi family.
- Count Antonio Bonzi Vimercati (1879- 1944): Cavalry major in the Royal Italian Army.
- Count Enzo Bonzi (1862 - ??): Educated at the Military College of Milan and the Military Academy of Modena, pursuing a career in the Royal Italian Army where he rose to the rank of lieutenant colonel in the 2nd Infantry Regiment (1910) and subsequently colonel. From an early age, he took part in early colonial operations in Eritrea (Massawa, Assab, and Beylul), later returning to the colony as a major to command the Keren garrison with the "Toselli" battalion. In 1926, he led an exploratory and economic mission to Italian Somaliland and Oltre Giuba (Jubaland). During this expedition, he inspected agricultural reclamation works along the Shebelle River alongside the Duke of the Abruzzi, conducted reconnaissance missions up to the Kenyan border, and subsequently became one of the key promoters behind the industrial development of the major salt works at Hafun in the Majeerteen region (Migiurtinia).
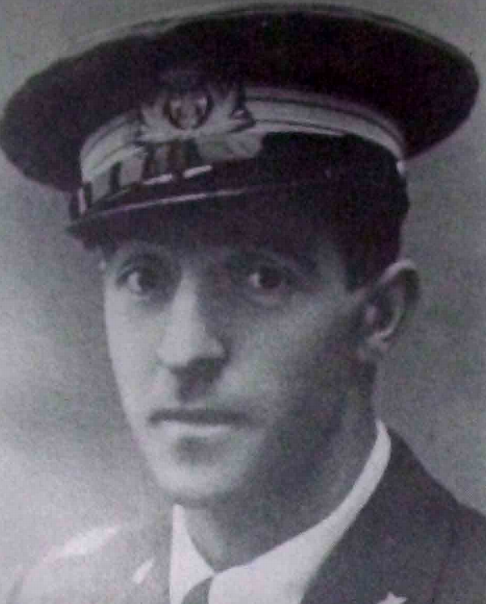
  Leonardo Bonzi
- Count Leonardo Bonzi (1902–1977): An aviator, filmmaker, tennis player, and bobsledder, renowned for his sporting achievements and film career. He participated in major transatlantic flights, including the 1948 Atlantic crossing with the aircraft "Grifo," and co-directed the documentary film Lost Continent, which won the Special Jury Prize at the Cannes Film Festival in 1955. He served as a pilot during World War II, receiving the Gold Medal and three Silver Medals of Military Valor. He owned land in the Municipality of Segrate, which he sold to Silvio Berlusconi's Edilnord to build Milan Due and the San Raffaele Hospital.

== Bibliography ==
- Conte Bonzi, E. (1946) I Conti del Serio. Memorie familiari dei Conti Bonzi fu Giuseppe, a cura del Conte Enzo Bonzi. La Moderna.
- Cantù, C. (1859). Grande illustrazione del Lombardo-Veneto. 2nd ed. Milano: Corona e Caimi Editori, Piazza di S. Ulderico N. 4673. Available at: https://books.google.co.uk/books?id=Lpw_AAAAcAAJ&hl=it
- Antonioli, G. (2017). 'Antonio Premoli: Il Podestà del buon governo di Crema (1934–1942)', Insula Fulcheria, pp. 365–382.
- Collegio Araldico (2015). Libro d'Oro della Nobiltà Italiana. Roma: Collegio Araldico.
- Bonzi, K. (2020). Translating the Book "I Conti del Serio": A Memoir of the Bonzi Family History. Senior Project, California Polytechnic State University.
- Comune di Ripalta Cremasca (n.d.) Villa Bonzi Ripalta Nuova. Casa e Parco. Comune di Ripalta Cremasca.
- Comune di Ripalta Cremasca (n.d.) Villa Bonzi San Michele. Comune di Ripalta Cremasca.
- Turismo Crema (n.d.) Museo Bonzi. Turismo Crema.
- Fondo Ambiente Italiano (n.d.) Museo Leonardo Bonzi. Fondo Ambiente Italiano.
- Maglia Rossonera (n.d.) Pres-Bonzi. Maglia Rossonera.
- Geni (n.d.) Maria Luisa Carlota di Borbone Parma, Kronprinzessin von Sachseness of Saxony. Geni.

== See also ==
- Crema (Italia)
- Milano
- Vimercate
- Consulta di Lione
- Umberto I di Savoia
- Repubblica di Venezia
- Vimercati
- Leonardo Bonzi
- Football Club Internazionale Milano
- Associazione Calcio Milan
- Milano 2
- Silvio Berlusconi
- Ernesto Nathan
- Zephaniah Swift Spalding
