= Leonardo Bonzi =

Italian bobsledder (1902–1977)

Count Leonardo Bonzi
Personal information
- Nationality: Italian
- Born: 22 December 1902 Milan, Italy
- Died: 29 December 1977 (aged 75) Ripalta Cremasca, Italy

Sport
- Sport: Aviation, Tennis and Bobsleigh

Count Leonardo Bonzi
- Allegiance: Kingdom of Italy
- Branch: Aviation
- Conflicts: World War II
- Awards: 1 Gold Medal of Military Valor; 3 Silver Medals of Military Valor

Count Leonardo Bonzi (22 December 1902 – 29 December 1977) was a lawyer, aviator, soldier, filmmaker, tennis player, and bobsledder, member of the Bonzi family and renowned for his sporting achievements and film career. He participated in major transatlantic flights, including the 1948 Atlantic crossing with the aircraft "Grifo," and co-directed the documentary film Lost Continent, which won the Special Jury Prize at the Cannes Film Festival in 1955. He served as a pilot during World War II, receiving the Gold Medal and three Silver Medals of Military Valor. He owned land in the Municipality of Segrate, which he sold to Silvio Berlusconi's Edilnord to build Milan Due and the San Raffaele Hospital.

== Biography ==
Leonardo Bonzi was born in Milan to Count Iro (1865–1939), a lawyer and vice president of the AC Milan football club from 1921 to 1923, and Sarina Nathan Berra (1872–1968), who was the paternal niece of Ernesto Nathan and sister of Edward Nathan Berra, one of AC Milan’s founding members. The Bonzi family had been ennobled in 1694 for services rendered to the Republic of Venice, receiving the title of Counts of the Serio. In 1738, the family was admitted to the patriciate of Crema following the marriage of Ercole Bonzi to a member of the Vimercati family.

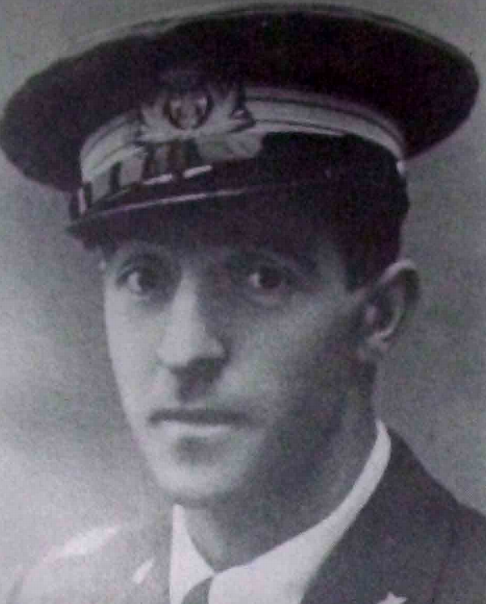
Leonardo Bonzi.

At the Chamonix Winter Olympics, where he served as flag bearer, he participated in the four-man bobsleigh event. Bonzi’s team, Italy-2, did not finish the race. He won the Italian tennis championships multiple times: in 1926, he won the mixed doubles title, and in 1929, he claimed titles in both men's doubles and mixed doubles. In 1929, he also competed in the Wimbledon tournament (where he was eliminated by George Lott) and the French Open (where he was eliminated by Uberto de Morpurgo).

The SAI Ambrosini S.1001 Grifo, registered I-ASSI and named "Angelo dei bimbi" ("Angel of the Children"), was flown by Bonzi in tandem with Maner Lualdi.

In 1937, Leonardo Bonzi married Elisa Lentati, also a passionate aviator and the first woman in Italy to obtain a pilot's license.

In 1948, together with Maner Lualdi, he undertook a flight over South America to raise public awareness about the plight of mutilated and orphaned children in those regions. They used a small tourist aircraft, the SAI Ambrosini S.1001 Grifo, registered I-ASSI and christened "Angel of the Children" for the occasion. The plane is now preserved at the Alfa Romeo Museum in Arese.

Bonzi was also a film director and producer. In 1945, he married actress Clara Calamai. He directed and produced documentaries with Astra Cinematografica, including Una lettera dall’Africa (1951) and Continente perduto (1955), which won the Special Jury Prize at the Cannes Film Festival and the Silver Plaque at the Berlin Festival. As a producer, he financed Magia verde (1952) by Gian Gaspare Napolitano and La muraglia cinese (1958) by Carlo Lizzani, the latter earning a David di Donatello award.

In 1961, he married for the third time, to Jacqueline de Rieupeyroux. In 1966, he became president of the Clubino di Milano.

Bonzi owned land in the municipality of Segrate, where Milano 2 and the San Raffaele Hospital would later be built. In 1968, he sold the land (spanning 712,000 square meters) to Silvio Berlusconi's Edilnord for about three billion lire, having already obtained authorization from the municipality between 1962 and 1965 to build 2.5 million cubic meters, in exchange for the commitment to handle urban development works.

In his later years, Leonardo Bonzi primarily resided in San Michele, a hamlet of Ripalta Cremasca, where the family villa of the Bonzi cadet branch was. The villa now houses the Leonardo Bonzi Museum, inaugurated on June 4, 2006, which showcases various objects linked to Bonzi’s life and athletic achievements: photographs, items (such as the propeller from the plane that overturned during a landing on Mont Blanc in 1931), medals, and trophies.

A plaque in the entrance hall of Palazzo Civita, at No. 2 Piazza Duse in Milan (longtime family residence), commemorates Leonardo Bonzi’s sporting feats and the honors he received.

== Filmography ==
- Una lettera dall'Africa (1951) (Director and producer)
- Magia verde (1952) (Producer)
- Continente perduto (1955) (Director and producer)
- La gran avventura (1974) (Actor)
