= Zurla =

Zurla may refer to:

- Zurla (instrument), an oboe-like woodwind instrument used in the Balkan countries
- Giacinto Placido Zurla (1769-1843), an Italian cardinal and a historian of mediaeval geography
- Evangelista Zurla, captain of the Genoese galley San Vittorio of Crema in the Battle of Lepanto
