= Bridget Holmes =

Domestic servant at the English royal court

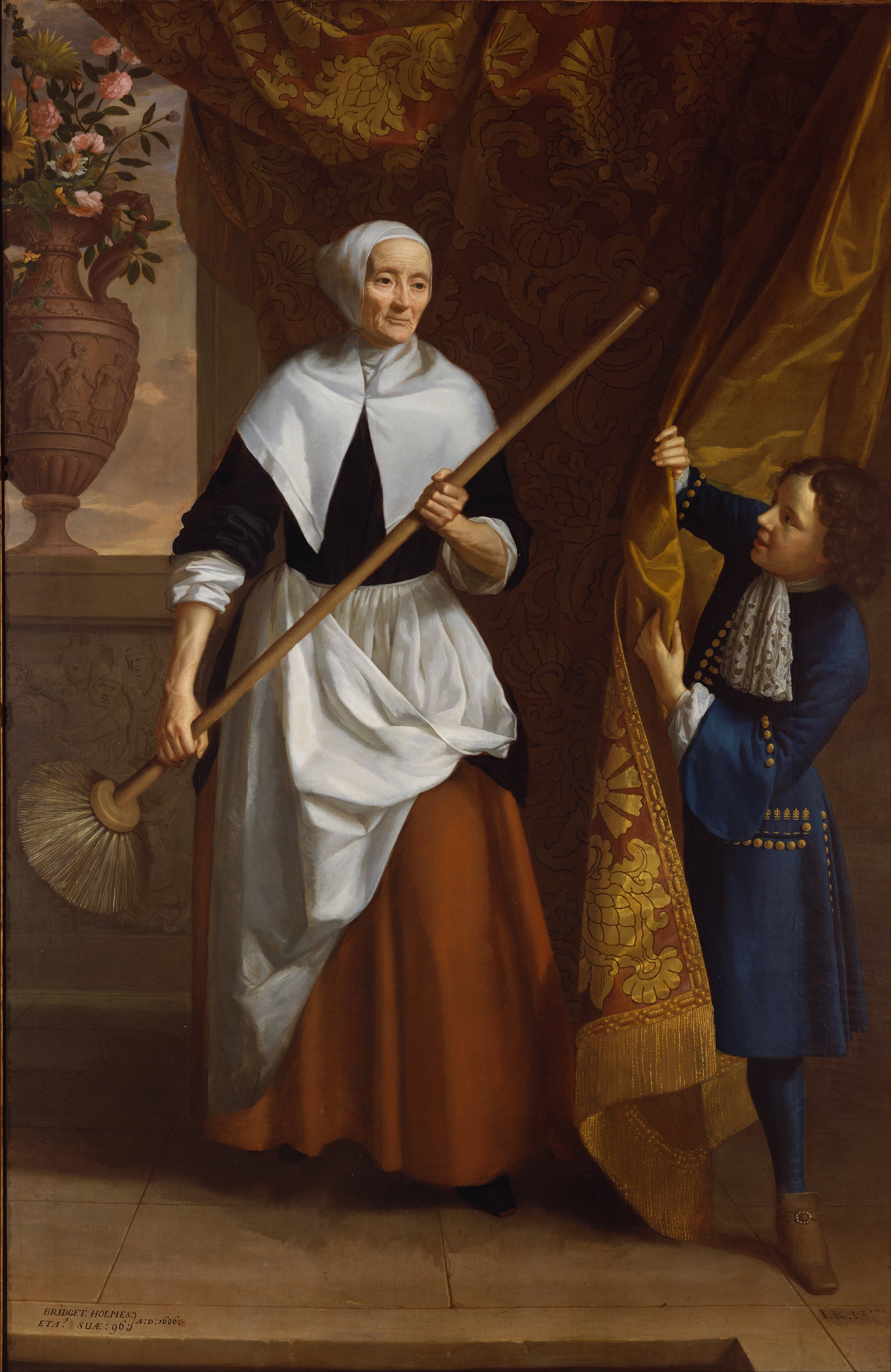
1686 portrait of Holmes by John Riley

Bridget Holmes (1591 – 1691) was a domestic servant at the English royal court in the 17th century. Holmes was a necessary woman whose duties included emptying and scouring chamber pots and cleaning the royal apartments. She served during the reigns of Charles I, Charles II, James II, and William III and Mary II.

She is best known as the subject of a full-length slightly over life-size portrait dated 1686 in the Royal Collection by John Riley, painted on a scale and "in a style...normally reserved for royalty" or the nobility. Though signed by Riley, the painting may owe much to the contribution of John Closterman, who often worked with Riley, because of its "impressive" composition. It is not clear why James II commissioned the portrait, which was an extravagant way to "celebrate her great age and her loyalty to the Stuarts", and also seems to make a "satirical or moral comment" on the conventions of grand portraiture, as "a parody of all those martial portraits of dukes and generals. But the figure herself is treated with great dignity, very respectfully. The joke's not on her" as one curator put it. Critic Ronald Jones noted that "[Holmes] is resonant with self-respect, and can play with her venerable position in the household; teasingly she brandishes her mop after a page-boy", a Page of the Backstairs according to the Royal Collection.

Riley painted two other, smaller, portraits of servants: Katherine Elliot (also Royal Collection) and A Scullion in the Christ Church Picture Gallery, Oxford. Other portraits by the Netherlandish painter Pieter Aertsen from the previous century show female cooks holding roasting spits like marshall's batons in what have been taken to be clear references to the conventions of elite portraiture, though whether these would have been known to James (who had spent his youth in exile in the Low Countries) or Riley is unknown.

Bridget Holmes died in 1691 at the age of 100 and was buried in Westminster Abbey with a monument noting the monarchs whom she had served. She is believed to have been "one of the longest serving servants in royal history".

The painting of Bridget Holmes is among the "few pre-eighteenth-century portraits of working-class people" in existence. It is normally on display in the state apartments of Windsor Castle. It was included in the "Below Stairs" exhibition of servant portraits at the National Portrait Gallery, London in 2003, and has also been shown in other exhibitions of the Royal Collection.
