= Claude Duflos =

French engraver (1665–1727)

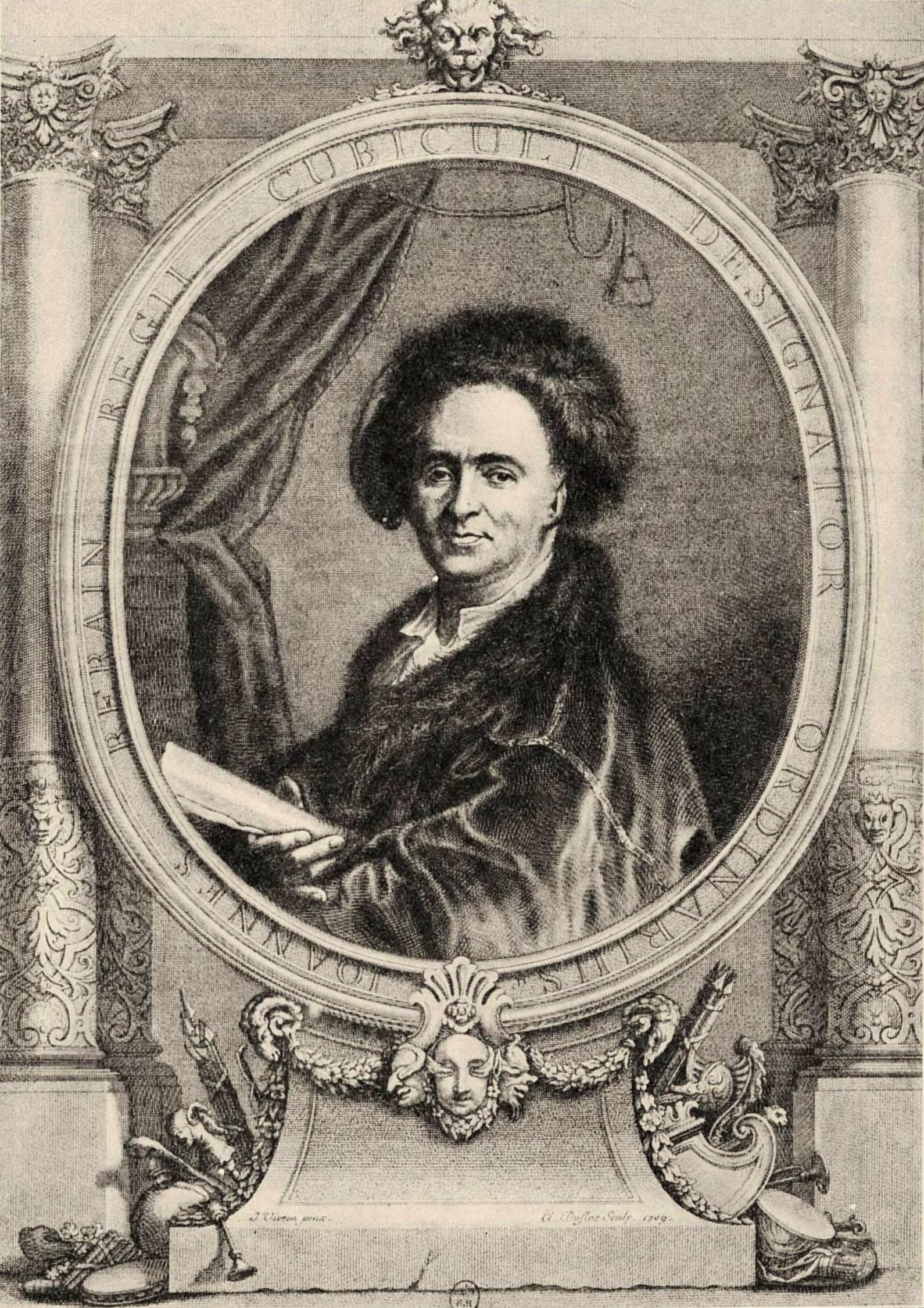
Portrait of Jean Bérain the Elder, engracing by Duflos after Joseph Vivien

Claude Duflos (1665–1727) was a French engraver.

Duflos was born and died in Paris. It is not known by whom he was instructed, but his style resembles that of François de Poilly. He left a great number of plates, executed principally with the burin, and very neatly finished. The following are the most notable:

== Portraits ==
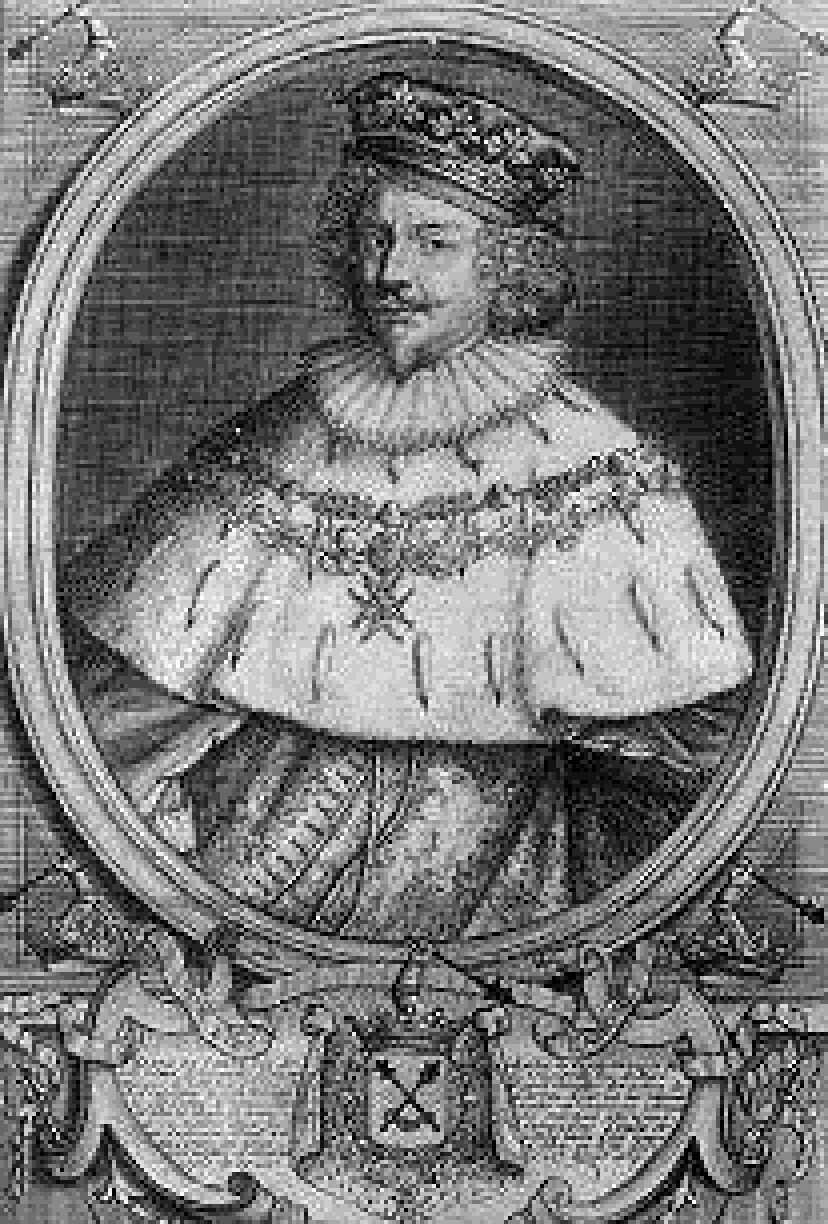
Henri de Gondi, duc de Retz

- Philip, Duke of Orleans; after R. Tournières.
- Jean-François-Paul de Gondy, Cardinal de Retz.
- Denis-François de Chavigny, Bishop of Troyes.
- Nicolas Lyon, Procureur du Roi; after Herluyson.
- Jean Jacques Gaudart, Conseiller du Roi; after Largillière.
- Marc René de Voyer; after Hyacinthe Rigaud.

== Subjects after various masters ==
- The Entombment of Christ; after P. Perugino; for the Crozat Collection.
- The same subject; after Raphael.
- St. Michael discomfiting the Evil Spirit; after the same; for the Crozat Collection.
- Christ with the Disciples at Emmaus; after Paolo Veronese; for the Crozat Collection.
- The Adulteress before Christ; after N. Colombel.
- Christ at table with the Disciples; after Titian.
- Bust of the Virgin; after Guido.
- The Annunciation; after Albani.
- Christ appearing to Mary Magdalen; after the same.
- St. Cecilia; after P. Mignard.
- The Presentation in the Temple; after Le Sueur.
- The Descent from the Cross; after the same.
- The Murder of the Innocents; after Le Brun.
- Christ on the Mount of Olives; after the same.
- The Crucifixion; after the same.
- The same subject; after the same; from the print by Edelinck.
- The Dead Christ, with the Virgin and St. John; after the same.
- The Descent of the Holy Ghost; after the same.
- The Assumption of the Virgin; after the same.
- The Penitent Magdalen; after the same.
- The Annunciation; after A. Coypel.
- The Crucifixion; after the same.
- The Magdalen at the foot of the Cross; after the same.
- A Concert; after Domenichino.
- The Triumph of Galatea; after the same.
- Cupid stung by a Bee; after the same.
- The same subject; smaller and circular.
- Bacchus and Ariadne; after the same.
- The Triumph of Bacchus; after C. Natoire.
- The Triumph of Amphitrite; after the same.
