= Henri de Gondi, duc de Retz =

French noble (1590–1659)

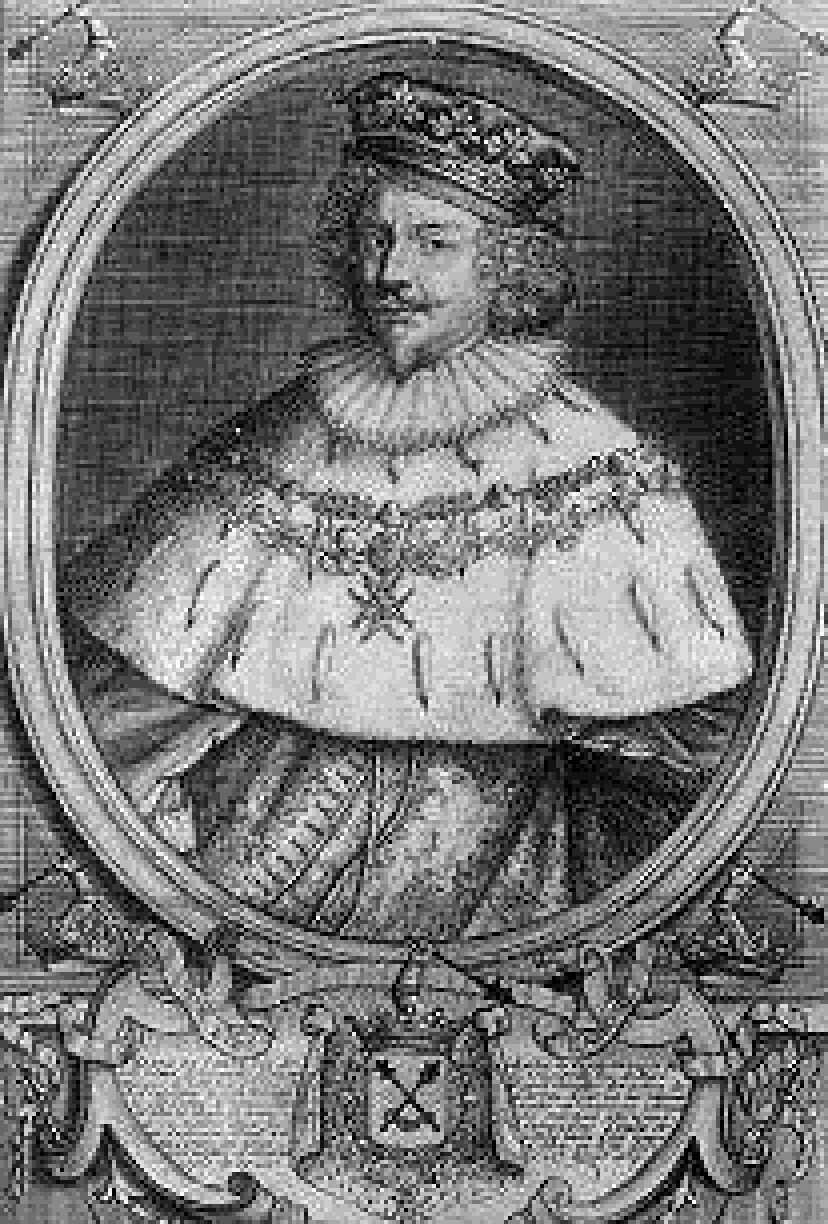
Henri de Gondi, duc de Retz, by Claude Duflos

Henri de Gondi, duc de Retz (1590–1659) was a French nobleman of the Gondi family. He was the son of Charles de Gondi, duc de Retz and Antoinette d'Orléans-Longueville (1574 – 25 April 1618), lady of Château-Gontier (daughter of Léonor d'Orléans, duc de Longueville).

Henri de Gondi became duc de Retz on his father's death in 1596. He married Jeanne de Beaupreau, and they had 2 daughters.
