= Aldo Bonzi =

- Town
- Location in Greater Buenos Aires
- Coordinates: 34°42′30″S 58°31′05″W
- Country: Argentina
- Province: Buenos Aires
- Partido: La Matanza
- Founded: May 25, 1911

Area
  - Total: 4.9 km^{2} (1.9 sq mi)
- Elevation: 13 m (43 ft)

Population (2022 census [INDEC])
  - Total: 15,762
  - Density: 3,200/km^{2} (8,300/sq mi)
- CPA Base: B 1770
- Area code: +54 011
- Website: http://www.bonziweb.com.ar/

Aldo Bonzi is a town in La Matanza Partido, Buenos Aires Province, Argentina. It is located within the Greater Buenos Aires metro area.

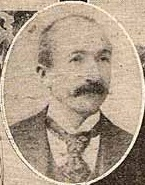
Dr. Aldo Bonzi

The town owes its name to Turin-born businessman Dr. Aldo Bonzi (1852–1935), who arrived in Argentina in 1896. Bonzi and his partner, Maurizio Andreossi of Switzerland, purchased an estancia in Córdoba Province, where they raised Aberdeen Angus cattle as well as grains. They then purchased land west of Buenos Aires from the Carminotti family, reselling a portion to the Buenos Aires Midland Railway in 1908. The arrival of this rail line prompted the establishment of the settlement as Villa del Prado in 1911.

The town's master plan was approved by La Matanza County in 1917, and in 1918, Bonzi donated further land for the construction of a parish church and a school. The Church of Our Lady of Grace (Nuestra Señora de las Gracias) was consecrated in 1927.

== Climate ==
The climate in this area is characterized by hot, humid summers and generally mild to cool winters. According to the Köppen Climate Classification system, Aldo Bonzi has a humid subtropical climate, abbreviated "Cfa" on climate maps.
