= House of Zurla =

Italian family

Zurla
- Noble house
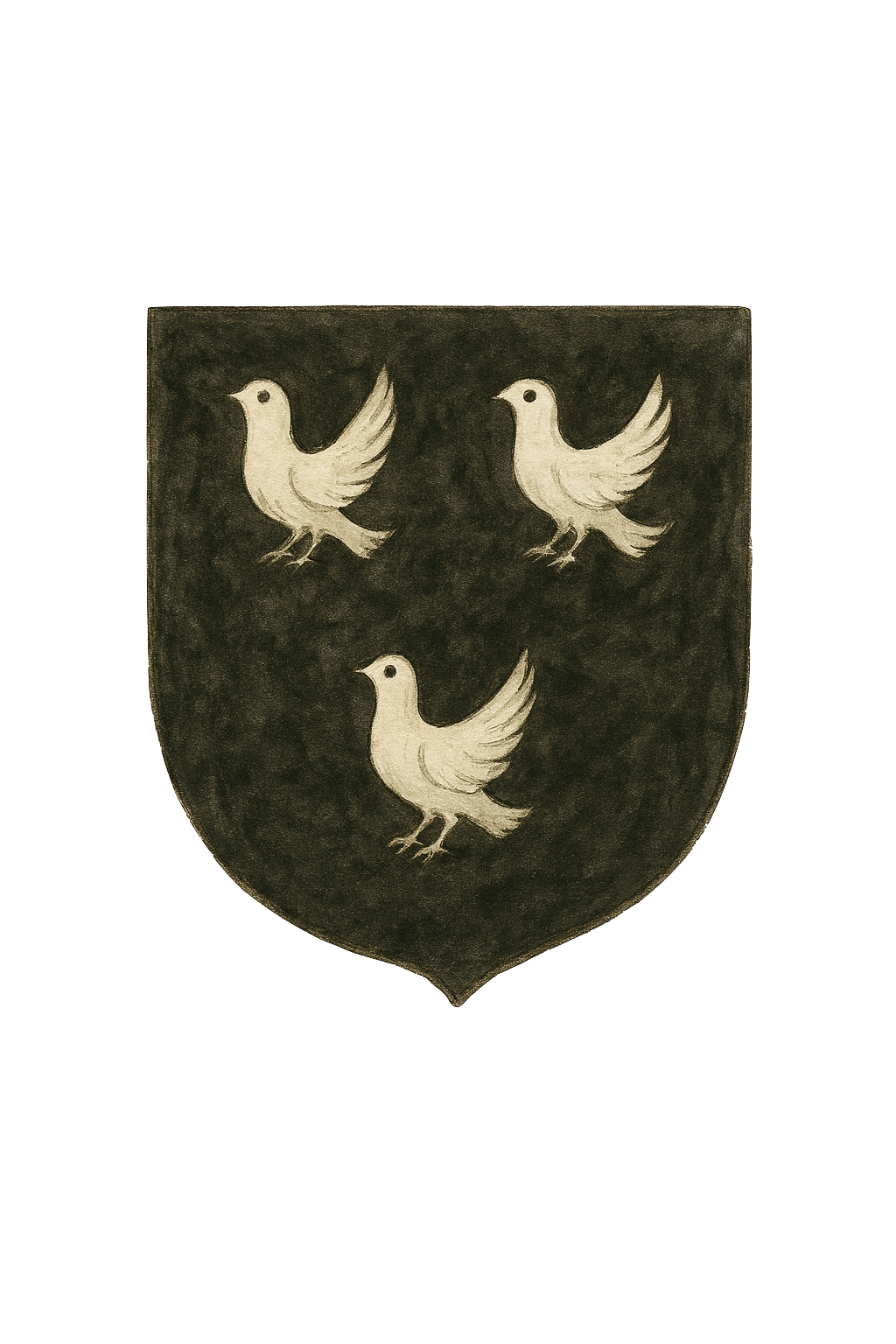
- Country: Italy
- Place of origin: Crema
- Founded: 1140
- Founder: Alberto Zurla
- Titles: Cardinal (non hereditary); Bishop (non hereditary); Marquis of the Holy Roman Empire; Count of the Holy Roman Empire; Knight of the Holy Roman Empire; Noble
- Cadet branches: Zurla-Albergoni; Zurla-Rovereti

The House of Zurla is a historic family of the Cremasque nobility and attested since the XII century. Originally from Naples, the center of the family moved to Crema in 1140 with Alberto Zurla. In the following centuries, it gained considerable importance in the political, religious, and military life of the city.

== Origins and rise ==
The earliest records date back to the 12th century: one of the 21 towers erected in the walls of Crema in 1185 was named the Zurla Tower, testifying to the importance of the family.

In the 15th century, the Zurla were supporters of the Guelph faction and allied with the Benzoni. Enrico Zurla served as podestà of Crema under Giorgio Benzoni.

In 1450, Giacomo Zurla delivered the surrender of Crema to Charles VII, King of France, and was subsequently exiled after being invested as a knight. In 1578, Quirino Zurla obtained from Pope Gregory XIII the elevation of the Curia of Crema to the rank of diocese.

== Modern era ==
During the 16th century, the family rose to great influence: in 1580, thirty-eight Zurla were registered among the 185 gentlemen of the Municipal Council of Crema. The Council attempted to limit the maximum number of members from the same family, but the Republic of Venice rejected the request.

The Zurla Palace, adorned with paintings by artists such as the Civerchi, Aurelio Buso, and Carlo Urbino, became a center of cultural and social life.

In the 17th century, Silvio Zurla distinguished himself as a valiant fighter in the War of Candia, receiving from the Grand Master of the Order of St. John the titles of Captain of Galley and Conservator of Nobility. He died in 1685, leaving to the Church of San Francesco in Crema the galley banner he had dedicated to Saint Anthony.

At the end of the 17th century, Achille and Luigi Zurla were granted by Emperor Leopold I of Austria (November 12, 1669) the titles of Marquises, Counts, and Knights of the Holy Roman Empire, transmissible to their descendants.

In 1823 Pope Pius VII named Giacinto Placido Zurla Cardinal and later served as Vicar of Rome.

== Alliances and marriages ==
The Zurla allied themselves with various noble families, including the Lords and Marquises Benzoni, the Counts Vimercati, the Counts Bonzi, the Grand Dukes Medici, Carioni, Albergoni, and Rovereti.

Some branches adopted the surnames Zurla-Albergoni and Zurla-Rovereti.

== Coat of arms ==
The family had several heraldic versions. Among the principal: “Sable, three argent birds volant, beaked and membered gules.”

== Family members ==
- Pantaleone Zurla (XV century): Franciscan friar, Bishop of Sicca in Tunisia, and Archdeacon of Crema Cathedral.
- Michele Zurla (XV century): lieutenant of Bartolomeo Colleoni; in 1472 obtained the privilege of bearing the Colleoni arms for himself and his descendants.
- Margherita Zurla (†1438): benefactress, who left legacies to the Monte di Pietà and the Hospital of the Infirm in Crema.
- Evangelista Zurla il Vecchio (XVI century): knight, participated in the defense of Famagusta and fought against the Turks in the service of Venice; married into the noble Venetian Mocenigo family.
- Giulio Zurla (XVI century): jurist and orator, sent by the Municipal Council of Crema to Venice in 1568; in 1581 delivered notable public speeches.
- Emilia Zurla (†1590): gentlewoman, wife of Colonel Scipione Piacenzi; distinguished for her courage in the War of Cyprus and known as a benefactress of charitable works.
- Evangelista Zurla il Giovane (†1571): commander of the galley Crema S. Vittorio at the Battle of Lepanto; died of plague in Corfu.
- Gianbattista Zurla (†1656): renowned physician and physicist, son of Celso Zurla and Margherita Benzoni.
- Silvio Zurla (†1685): Knight of St. John, valorous combatant in the War of Candia, honored with the titles of Captain of Galley and Conservator of Nobility.
- Gian Andrea Zurla (XVIII century): benefactor who in 1738 promoted the foundation of the Hospital of the Infirm in Crema.
- Giacinto Placido Zurla (1769-1834): Camaldolese cardinal, theologian, and distinguished geographer; served as Vicar of Rome under Popes Leo XII, Pius VIII, and Gregory XVI. Author of major works such as the Mappamondo of Fra Mauro, the Dissertation on the Voyages of the Zeno Brothers, and on Marco Polo and other illustrious Venetian travelers.
