= Zephaniah Swift Spalding =

American sugar plantation owner (1837–1927)

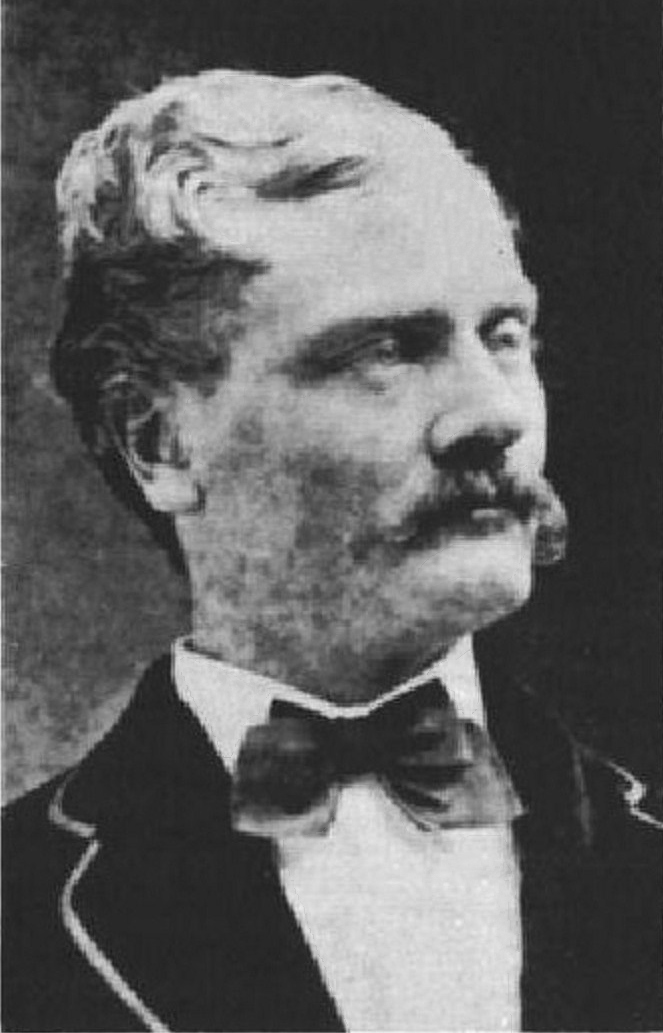
- Born: September 2, 1837; Warren, Ohio, U.S.
- Died: June 19, 1927 (aged 89); Pasadena, California, U.S.
- Occupation: Businessman
- Spouse: Wilhelmina Harris Makee (m. 1871)
- Children: 5
- Father: Rufus P. Spalding
- Relatives: William R. Day (nephew); William Louis Day (great-nephew); Stephen A. Day (great-nephew)

Zephaniah Swift Spalding (September 2, 1837– June 19, 1927) was a veteran of the American Civil War, who was first sent to Hawaii on a clandestine mission for US Secretary of State William H. Seward. He later moved to Hawaii and made a fortune in the sugar plantation business.

== Early years ==
Commonly known as Col. Spalding, or as Z. S., Zephaniah Swift Spalding was born in Warren, Ohio, on September 2, 1837, the fifth of seven children of Lucretia A. Swift Spalding and Rufus Paine Spalding. As a young lawyer, Rufus had apprenticed under Lucretia's father Zephaniah Swift. Two years after son Zephaniah's birth, Rufus entered politics, as a member of the Ohio House of Representatives, and later as a member of the US House of Representatives.

In the American Civil War, Z. S. was a Union Army lieutenant colonel in the 27th Ohio Infantry.

== Hawaii ==
During the reign of Kamehameha V, debates heated up in both Honolulu and Washington D. C. over a proposed sugar tariff reciprocity treaty between the United States and the Kingdom of Hawaii, versus outright American annexation of the island nation. Secretary of State William H. Seward enlisted Spalding in an 1867 clandestine mission to Hawaii as a go-between observer accompanying United States Ambassador to Hawaii Edward M. McCook. Spalding would later testify that Seward's verbal directives were to gather intelligence on the kingdom's perspectives of Hawaii's ties to America, but was unwilling to put his directives in writing. His father Congressman Spalding received his son's missives, and forwarded them to Seward. Following the defeat of a proposed reciprocity treaty in the United States Congress, Spalding was named the United States Consul to Hawaii for twelve months during 1868–1869.

Spalding eventually relocated to San Francisco, California. With the passage of the Reciprocity Treaty of 1875, he returned to Hawaii as an agent for the "Sugar Refineries of the city of San Francisco" bidding for the total year's crop. The planters rejected the proposition, and Spalding re-approached them as an independent buyer. He along with John Smith Walker and William G. Irwin organized William G. Irwin & Co.

He began investing in the sugar industry, as owner of the Kealia Plantation on Kauai. He married Wilhelmina Makee, daughter of James Makee, owner of the Makee Sugar Company at Kapaa. Upon Makee's 1879 death, Spalding inherited all of his father-in-law's business investments. As the 1883 renewal, or termination, of the reciprocity treaty neared, the previously independent planters saw it in their best interests to organize. Spalding was one of the founders of the Planters Labor and Supply Company when it was chartered in March 1882. In October, he was elected president. The Makee Company was sold in 1916 for an undisclosed sum, but speculators at the time believed the sale price was in the area of $2,000,000 (equivalent to $57,792,049 in 2024).

Several individuals over the decades put forth proposals to lay a telegraph cable from San Francisco to each of the Hawaiian islands. The Republic of Hawaii contracted with Spalding in 1895, allotting a modest annual subsidy for the project, with a stipulation of a November 1, 1898 completion deadline. Additional funding was needed from the US government, but Congress failed to act on Spalding's request, and the terms of the contract could not be met. It was not until 1900 that the US Senate allocated money for a cable, which was laid by the Commercial Pacific Company in 1902.

Spalding was appointed to represent Hawaii at the 1889 Universal Exposition (World's Fair) in Paris.

== Personal life ==
On July 18, 1871, he married Wilhelmina Harris Makee (1847–1908). They had five children: Rufus Paine Spalding (1875–1946), Catherine Lucretia “Kitty” Spalding Clearwater (1875–1965), Julia Makee Spalding Senni (1876–1949), Alice Makee Spalding Bonzi (1879–1949) and James Makee Spalding (1880–1954). The children were educated in Europe.

The family maintained homes in both Hawaii and California. Spalding's 50th birthday celebration on Kauai in 1887, drew an estimated attendance of 1,000 to 1,400 guests. Mrs. Spalding was primarily based in California, and had been in ill health for years, prior to her 1908 death. Z. S. died June 19, 1927, at his home in Pasadena, California.

== Bibliography ==
- Dole, Charles S. (1929). "Papers of the Hawaiian Historical Society number 16: The Hui Kawaihau". hdl:10524/978.
- Kuykendall, Ralph Simpson (1953). The Hawaiian Kingdom 1854–1874, Twenty Critical Years. Vol. 2. Honolulu: University of Hawaii Press. ISBN 978-0-87022-432-4. OCLC 47010821.
- Kuykendall, Ralph Simpson (1967). The Hawaiian Kingdom 1874–1893, The Kalakaua Dynasty. Vol. 3. Honolulu: University of Hawaii Press. ISBN 978-0-87022-433-1. OCLC 500374815.
- Lydecker, Robert C. (1918). Roster legislatures of Hawaii, 1841–1918.: Constitutions of monarchy and republic, speeches of sovereign and President. Hawaiian Gazette Co. – via HathiTrust.
- Republic of Hawaii (1894–1898). "Constitution of the Republic of Hawaii and laws passed by the Executive and Advisory Councils of the Republic". Vols. For 1895-1898 Have Title:laws of the Republic of Hawaii. Laws, etc. (Session laws : 1894-1898). Hawaiian Gazette Company: 4 v.
- Scharnhorst, Gary (2007). ""I Wish to Know More About the Islands": Kate Field in Hawaii, 1895–1896". Hawaiian Journal of History. 41. hdl:10524/12228.
- US Government (1895). United States Congressional serial set. Sworn Statement of Zephaniah Swift Spalding: United States Government. pp. 233–261.
