= John Closterman =

German portrait painter (1660–1711)

Charles II of Spain and his queen, Maria Anna of Neuburg, c. 1696

John Closterman (also spelt Cloosterman, Klosterman; 1660 – 24 May 1711 (buried)) was a Westphalian portrait painter of the late 17th and early 18th centuries. His subjects were mostly European noblemen and their families.

He worked in several countries, but found most success in London, where he settled and died.

== Career ==
Born in Osnabrück in the Holy Roman Empire (now in Lower Saxony), Closterman was the son of an artist who taught him the rudiments of design.

In 1679, Closterman went to Paris and worked under François de Troy. In 1681, he went to England. He worked for John Riley, painting the draperies in Riley's portraits

When Riley died in 1691, Closterman finished several of his portraits. Because of his work on Riley's portraits, Charles Seymour, 6th Duke of Somerset, hired him to create some paintings. However, Somerset became dissatisfied with the purchase of a painting by the Italian painter Guercino that Closterman had tried to arrange for him, ending the relationship. Charles Montagu, 1st Earl of Halifax eventually purchased the portrait.

In 1696, Closterman was invited to the court of Spain, where he painted a portrait of Charles II of Spain, his wife, Maria Anna of Neuburg and some others. He also travelled to Italy twice, where he bought several artworks. When he returned to England, Closterman found a high demand for his services among the social elite.

At this time, he married an Englishwoman, Hannah; she died and was buried on 27 January 1702. According to Arnold Houbraken, Closterman later took a mistress who stole much of his property and then left him. Her departure allegedly precipitated Closterman's physical and mental decline. Jacob Campo Weyerman, who took much of his biographical material from Houbraken, states "Closterman had taken a beautiful mistress who, while he was away in the country, robbed him of his valuables and disappeared, actions which drove the painter into madness".

Closterman died in 1711 and was buried in Covent Garden churchyard in London.

== Works ==
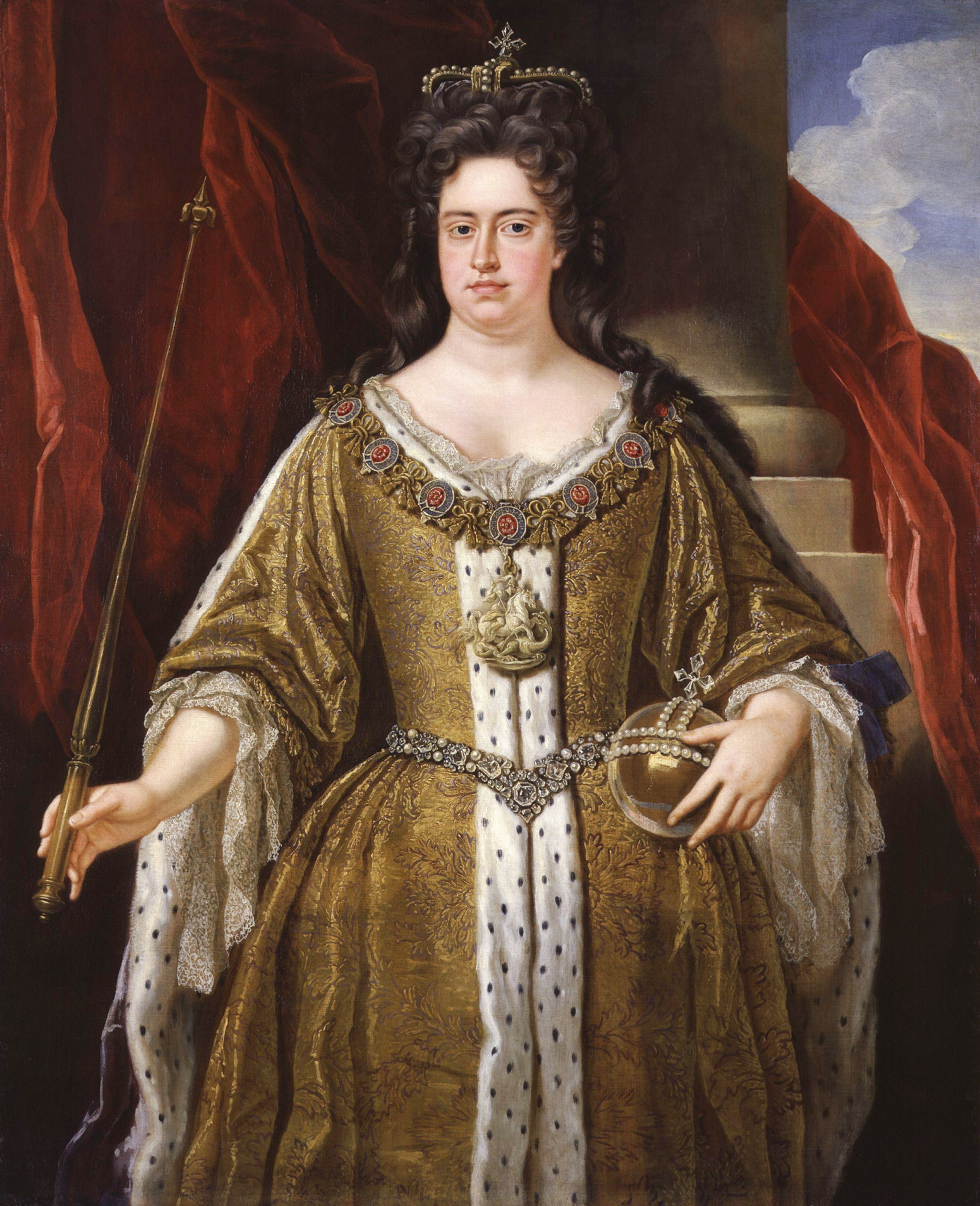
Queen Anne, workshop version, c. 1702

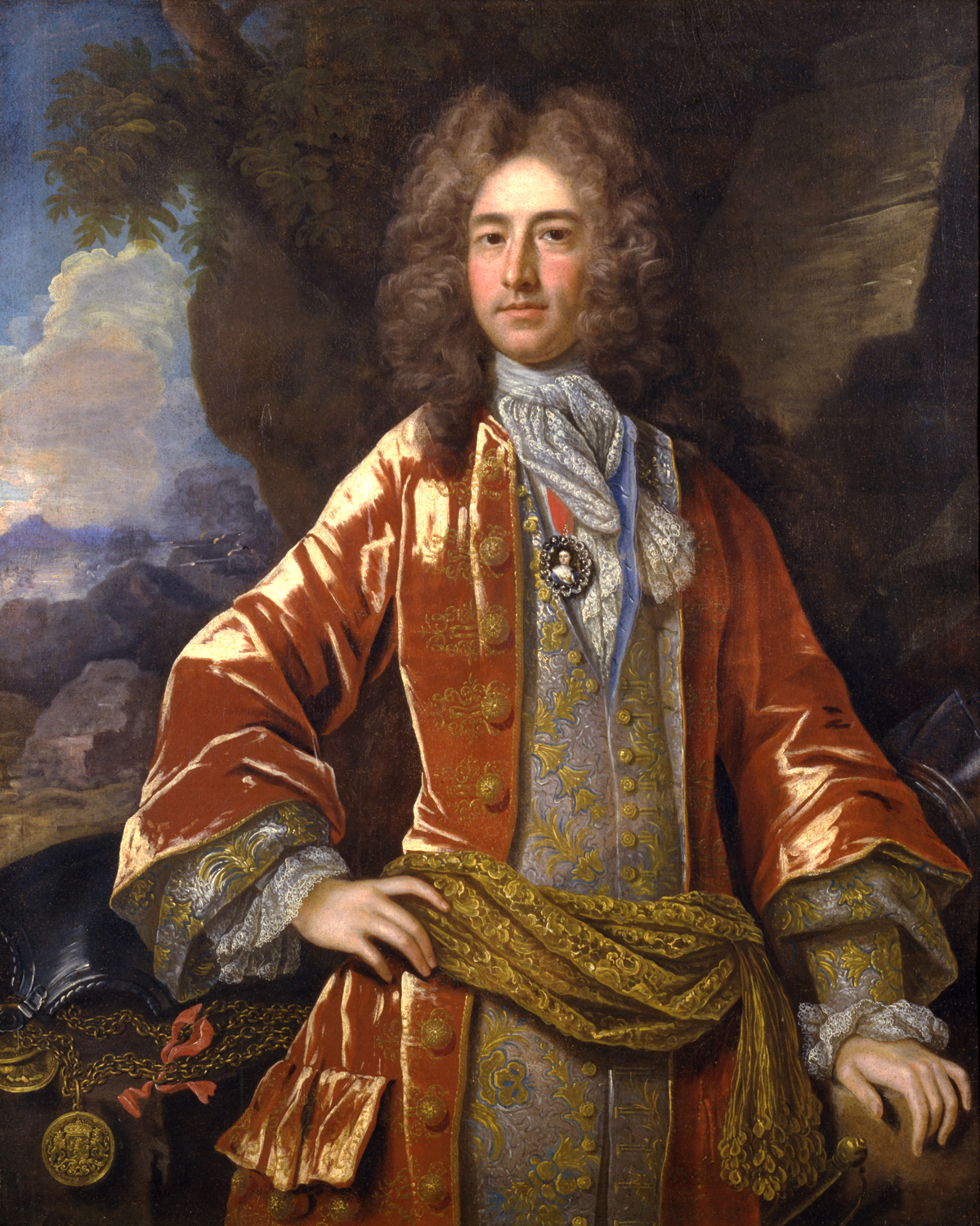
Daniel Parke II by John Closterman, oil on canvas, 1706, Virginia Historical Society

In 1702, Closterman painted a whole-length portrait of Anne, Queen of Great Britain in her coronation robes, wearing a crown, and carrying the orb and sceptre. The Queen Anne portrait was originally exhibited in the Guildhall, London. The prime version of the portrait has disappeared, but a study is part of the collection of the National Portrait Gallery, London and some of the many workshop copies made survive.

Closterman also painted a family portrait of John Churchill, 1st Duke of Marlborough and his wife, Sarah Churchill, Duchess of Marlborough, with their five children: John Churchill, Marquess of Blandford, Henrietta Godolphin, 2nd Duchess of Marlborough, Lady Ann, Lady Elizabeth, and Lady Mary Churchill.

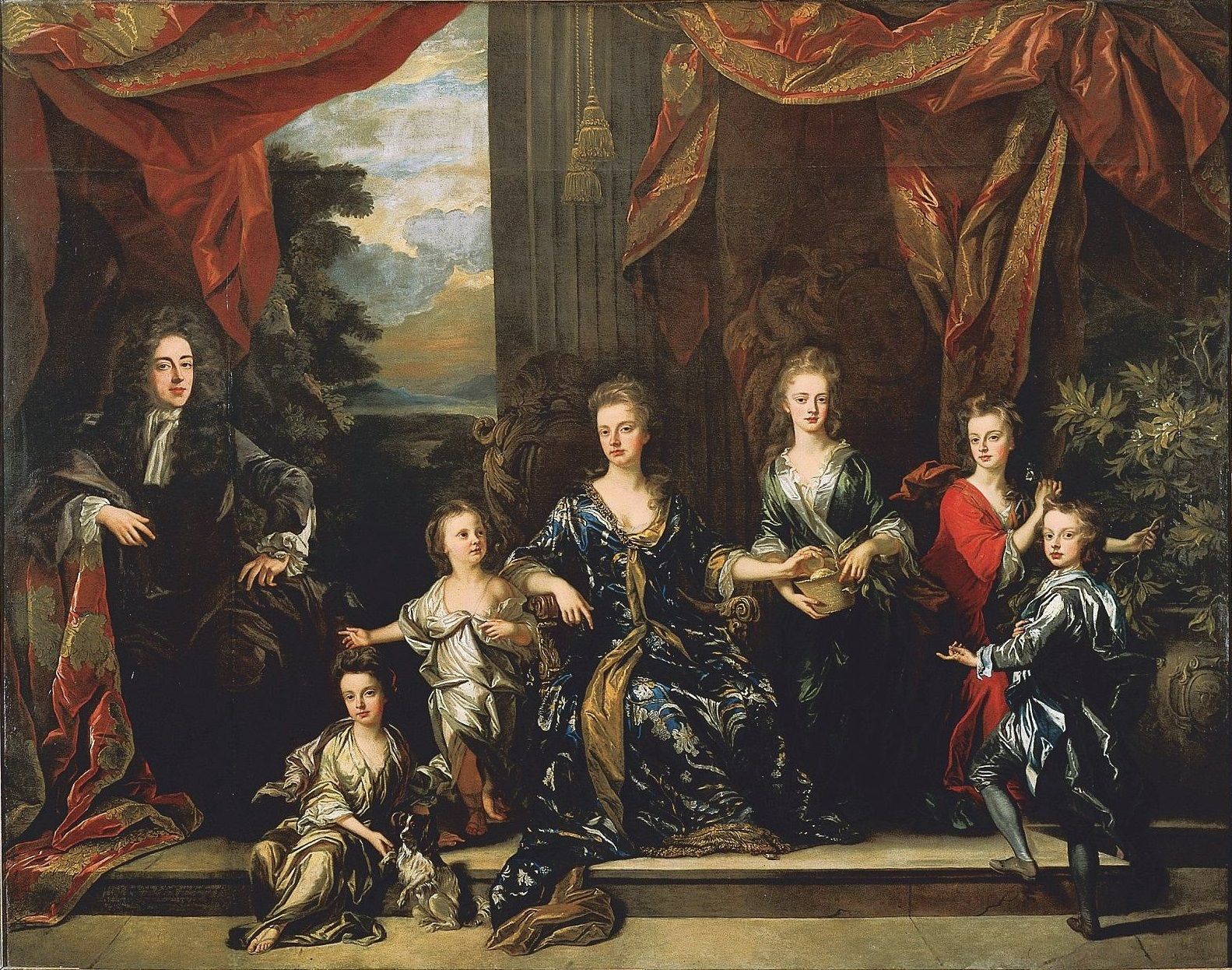
A later painting of The Marlborough family by John Closterman. On the Duke's left are Elizabeth, Mary, the Duchess, Henrietta, Anne and John.

In the Churchill portrait, the family is assembled beneath a rich hanging curtain on a raised dais; all the figures are lifesize. Closterman probably painted the portrait around the beginning of 1698. Closterman supposedly had so many disputes with Sarah Churchill that her husband remarked, "It has given me more trouble to reconcile my wife and you than to fight a battle". The story is told by Horace Walpole.

The Churchill portrait is now part of the collection at Blenheim Palace in Oxfordshire.

== Identity ==
For many years John Closterman and his artist brother John Baptist Closterman have been conflated in biographies, such as those in the Dictionary of National Biography and the Encyclopedia Britannica. An article by J. D. Stewart in The Burlington Magazine sets the record straight, citing John Closterman's will, which left part of his estate to "my Deare and Loveing Brother John Baptist".
