= Giacinto Gilioli =

Italian painter

Giacinto Gilioli (1594 – 27 June 1665) was an Italian painter of the baroque period, active mainly in Bologna. He trained with the Carracci brothers. He collaborated with the Flemish painters Willem Drost, van Terlee and Willem de Poorter.
