= Giacinto Lambiasi =

Italian pole vaulter

Personal information
- National team: Italy: 4 caps (1926-1930)
- Born: 16 August 1896 Cagliari, Italy
- Died: Unknown

Sport
- Sport: Athletics
- Event: Pole vault
- Club: Inter Milan (1920-1923); Pro Lissone (1924-1928); SA Ambrosiana (1929-1930)

Achievements and titles
- Personal best: Pole vault: 3.60 m (1930)

Giacinto Lambiasi (16 August 1896 - ?) was an Italian pole vaulter.

== National titles ==
Lambiasi won six national championships at individual senior level.

- Italian Athletics Championships
  - Pole vault: 1920, 1921, 1924, 1925, 1926, 1929 (6)
