= Placido Zurla =

Italian Camaldolese monk, writer and prelate

His Eminence Placido Zurla OSB
- Bishop of Edessa
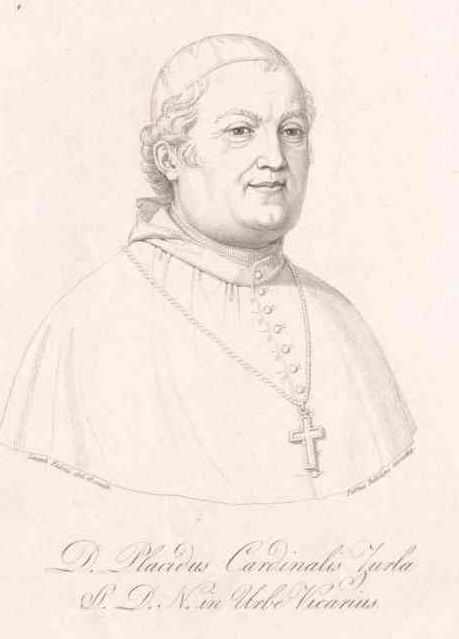
- Church: Catholic Church
- Diocese: Edessa
- Appointed: 13 January 1824
- Term ended: 29 October 1834
- Predecessor: Francesco Bertazzoli
- Successor: Ignazio Giovanni Cadolin

Orders
- Created cardinal: 10 March 1823 by Pope Pius VII

Personal details
- Born: 2 April 1769 Legnago, Veneto
- Died: 29 October 1834 (aged 65) Palermo, Sicily

Placido Zurla, also known as Giacinto Placido Zurla, O.S.B. Cam., (2 April 1769 – 29 October 1834) was an Italian Camaldolese monk and prelate, who was Cardinal Vicar of Rome and a writer on medieval geography. He was a member of the noble Zurla family.

== Biography ==
Placido Zurla was born at Legnago, Veneto, of noble parents and christened Giacinto (Hyacinth). At the age of eighteen Zurla entered the Camaldolese Monastery of St. Michael, situated on the island of Murano in the Venetian Lagoon. When he entered the novitiate of the monastery, he took the name Placid. There he found a lifelong friend in Mauro Cappellari (afterwards Pope Gregory XVI), then a young monk of his own age.

He became Lector in philosophy and theology, and in 1802 published a theological textbook. As librarian, his attention was attracted by the map of the world executed between 1457 and 1459 in that same monastery by the famous Camaldolese cartographer Fra Mauro. In 1806 Zurla published an account of it entitled Il Mappamondo di Fra Mauro. This led to further studies on early travelers, of which the most important result was the work, "Di Marco Polo e degli altri viaggiatori veneziano" (2 volumes, Venice, 1818–19).

In 1809 Zurla was elected a Definitor of his Congregation and given the title of Abbot. The next year the monastery was suppressed by order of Napoleon I, but the monks kept up their college dressed as secular priests. Of this institution Zurla acted as Rector and Cappellari as Lector of philosophy until its complete dissolution in 1814. From that year he taught theology at the Patriarchal Seminary of Venice till 1821, when he moved to Rome and resumed the white habit of St. Romuald at the Monastery of St. Gregory the Great. By that time, Cappellari was prior of that community.

Pope Pius VII named Zurla as a consultor to various congregations and Prefect of Studies at the Pontifical Urban College. in 1821 he received the cardinal's hat, and in the following year the titular see of Archbishop of Edessa. He served as Cardinal Vicar to Pope Leo XII and his two successors, and took an active interest in the organization of the Roman seminary, the reform of criminal tribunals, the delimitation of Roman parishes, and the affairs of the many Sacred Congregations of which he was a member. Cardinal Zurla was greatly loved by his friends, but his zeal for the reform of abuses made him some enemies in Rome.

He died at Palermo in 1834.

== Works by Placido Zurla ==
- Il mappamondo di fra Mauro, 1806
- Works by or about Placido Zurla at the Internet Archive

== See also ==
- Abbot
- Baptism
- Camaldolese
- Cardinal Vicar
- Congregation (Roman Curia)
- Consultor
- Definitor
- Fra Mauro
- Geography
- Giacinto
- Legnago
- List of bishops of Edessa
- Middle Ages
- Monk
- Murano
- Napoleon
- National boundary delimitation
- Novitiate
- Palermo
- Patriarch of Venice
- Philosophy
- Pontifical Urban College
- Pope Gregory XVI
- Pope Pius VII
- Prelate
- Prior (ecclesiastical)
- Rector (ecclesiastical)
- Religious habit
- Roman Colleges
- Romuald
- San Gregorio Magno al Celio
- San Michele in Isola
- Suppression of monasteries
- Theology
- Titular see
- Venetian Lagoon
- Veneto
- Zurla family

== Sources ==
- The Cardinals of the Holy Roman Church
