= Portrait of Elias Ashmole =

Painting by John Riley

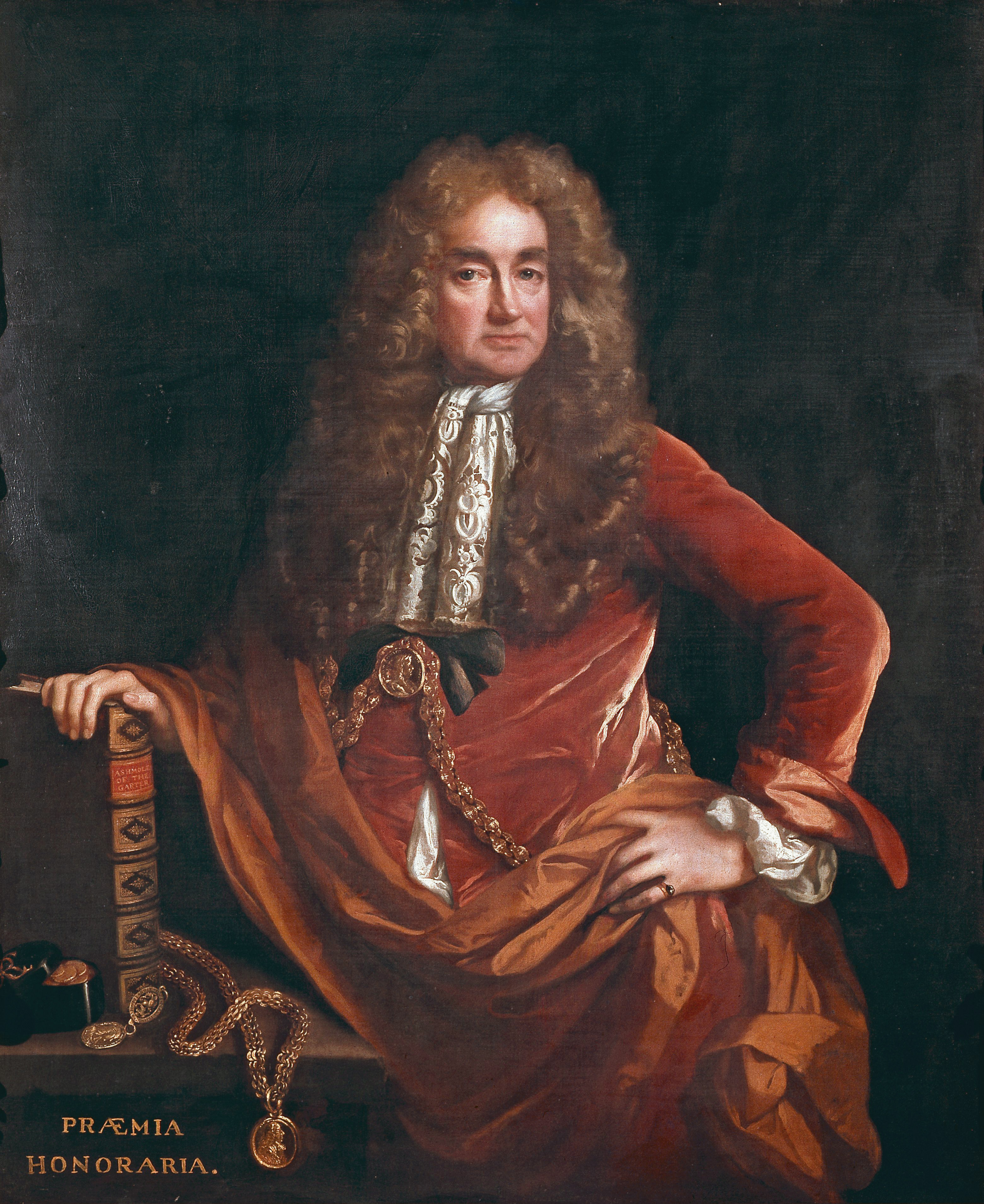
- Artist: John Riley
- Year: 1681–82
- Type: Oil on canvas, portrait painting
- Dimensions: 124 cm × 101 cm (49 in × 40 in)
- Location: Ashmolean Museum, Oxford

Portrait of Elias Ashmole is a 1682 portrait painting by the English artist John Riley. It depicts the antiquarian and politician Elias Ashmole. He is shown as a Windsor Herald, a position he was appointed to during the Restoration by Charles II, with his hand resting on his famous 1672 publication The Institutions, Laws, and Ceremonies of the Most Noble Order of the Garter. The painting's frame was produced by Grinling Gibbons.

Ashmole is noted for his role in the foundation of the Ashmolean Museum in Oxford. He donated much of his collection to the University of Oxford, which was initially housed in the Old Ashmolean in Broad Street. He commissioned this painting himself to present to the university. The painting has been in the collection of the Ashmolean since 1683.

== Bibliography ==
- Hunter, Michael. Elias Ashmole, 1617-1692, and His World. Ashmolean Museum, 1983.
- Wolfthal, Diane. Household Servants and Slaves: A Visual History, 1300-1700. Yale University Press, 2002.
