= John Riley (painter) =

English painter (1646–1691)

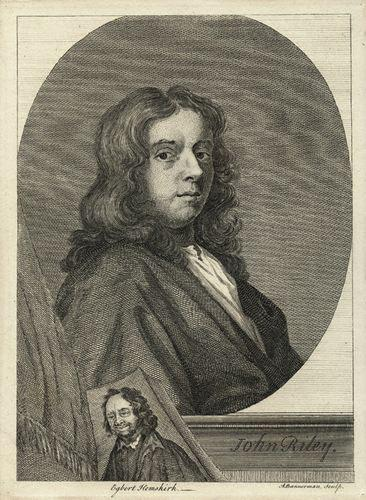
Riley by Egbert van Heemskerk the Younger (after John Riley)

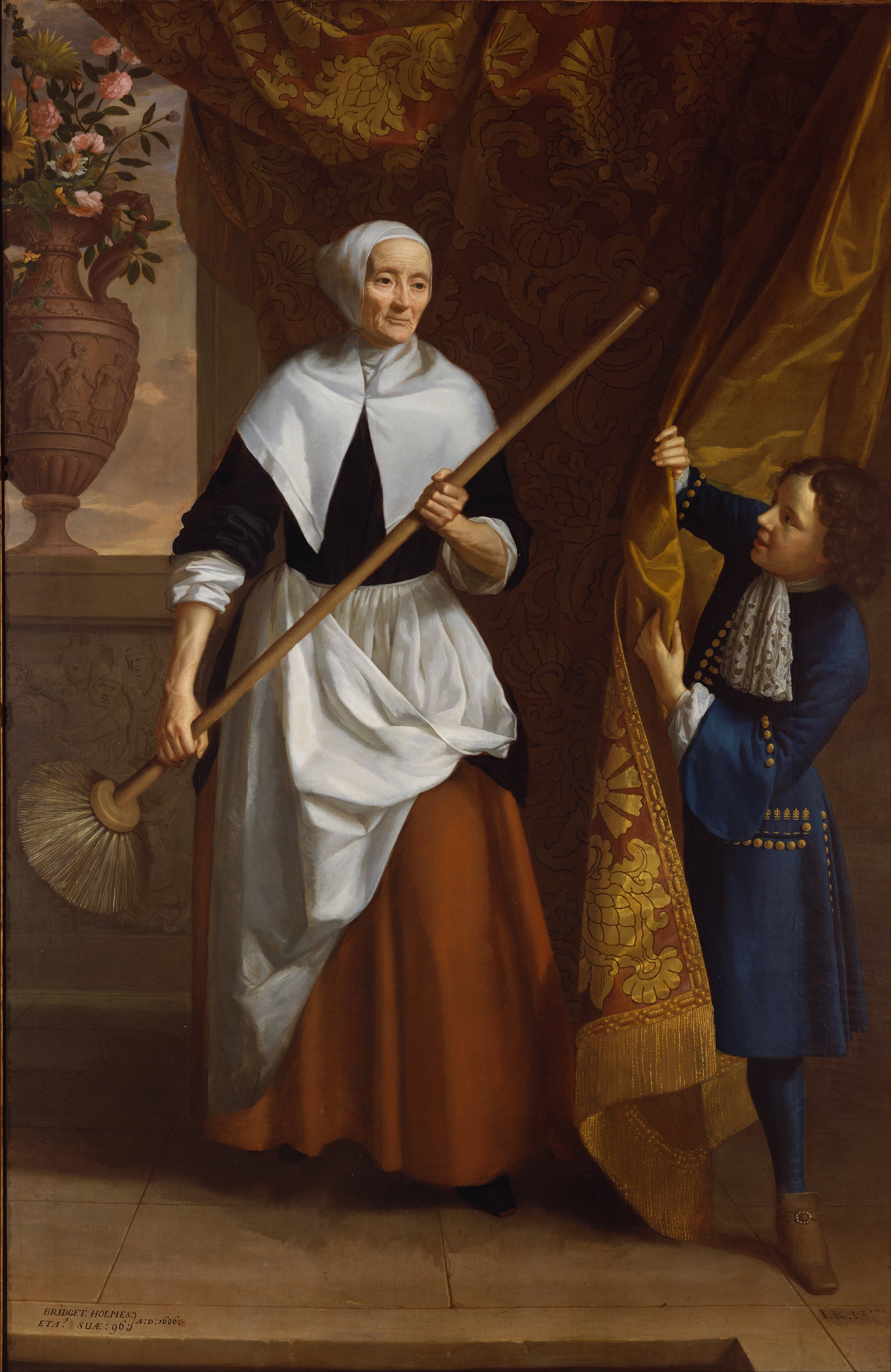
Portrait of Bridget Holmes by Riley, 1686

John Riley, or Ryley, (1646 – March 1691) was an English portrait painter. He painted portraits of Charles II and James II, and was court painter to William III and Mary II. One of his pupils was Jonathan Richardson.

== Life and work ==
Riley was born in London, one of the sons of William Ryley, Lancaster Herald and keeper of the records in the Tower of London, who was created Norroy king-at-arms under the Commonwealth, but reverted to his herald's office at the Stuart Restoration. Another son, Thomas Riley, was an actor.

Riley studied painting under Isaac Fuller and Gerard Soest, and from the latter learnt a forcible, straightforward style of portraiture which rendered his portraits noteworthy. Riley did not attain much eminence until the death of Sir Peter Lely, when courtier and royal official Thomas Chiffinch sat for him, and was so much pleased with his portrait that he showed it to the King. Charles II gave Riley some commissions, and eventually himself sat for him, apparently saying of the result: "Is this like me? Oddsfish, then I'm an ugly fellow!" Riley also painted James II and Mary of Modena, and, on the accession of William III and Mary II, he was appointed Principal Painter in Ordinary, jointly with Sir Godfrey Kneller, though he only survived for three years after this.

Riley was said to be a quiet, modest man, very diffident of his own art, but his portraits are truthful and lifelike. With more self-confidence he might have attained to the position of Lely or Kneller. His most successful works are often said to be three unusual portraits of servants. He painted a grand full-length of Bridget Holmes dated 1686 in the Royal Collection. She was a "necessary woman" at court whose duties included emptying and scouring chamber pots and cleaning the royal apartments. She served during the reigns of Charles I, Charles II, James II, and William III and Mary II. Two other, smaller, portraits of servants are Katherine Elliot (also Royal Collection) and A Scullion in the Christ Church Picture Gallery, Oxford.

He was assisted in painting (at least) his draperies and accessories by John Closterman, who finished several of Riley's pictures after his death.

Riley, who suffered very much from gout, died in March 1691, and was buried in the church of St. Botolph, Bishopsgate. The registers of this church contain various entries relating to his family, including the burial, on 11 January 1692–3, of his wife Jochebed.

Among Riley's pupils was Jonathan Richardson (1667–1745), who married a niece of Riley, and, being himself the master of Thomas Hudson (who was in his turn the master of Sir Joshua Reynolds), transmitted a truly national strain in the art of portraiture.

== Gallery ==
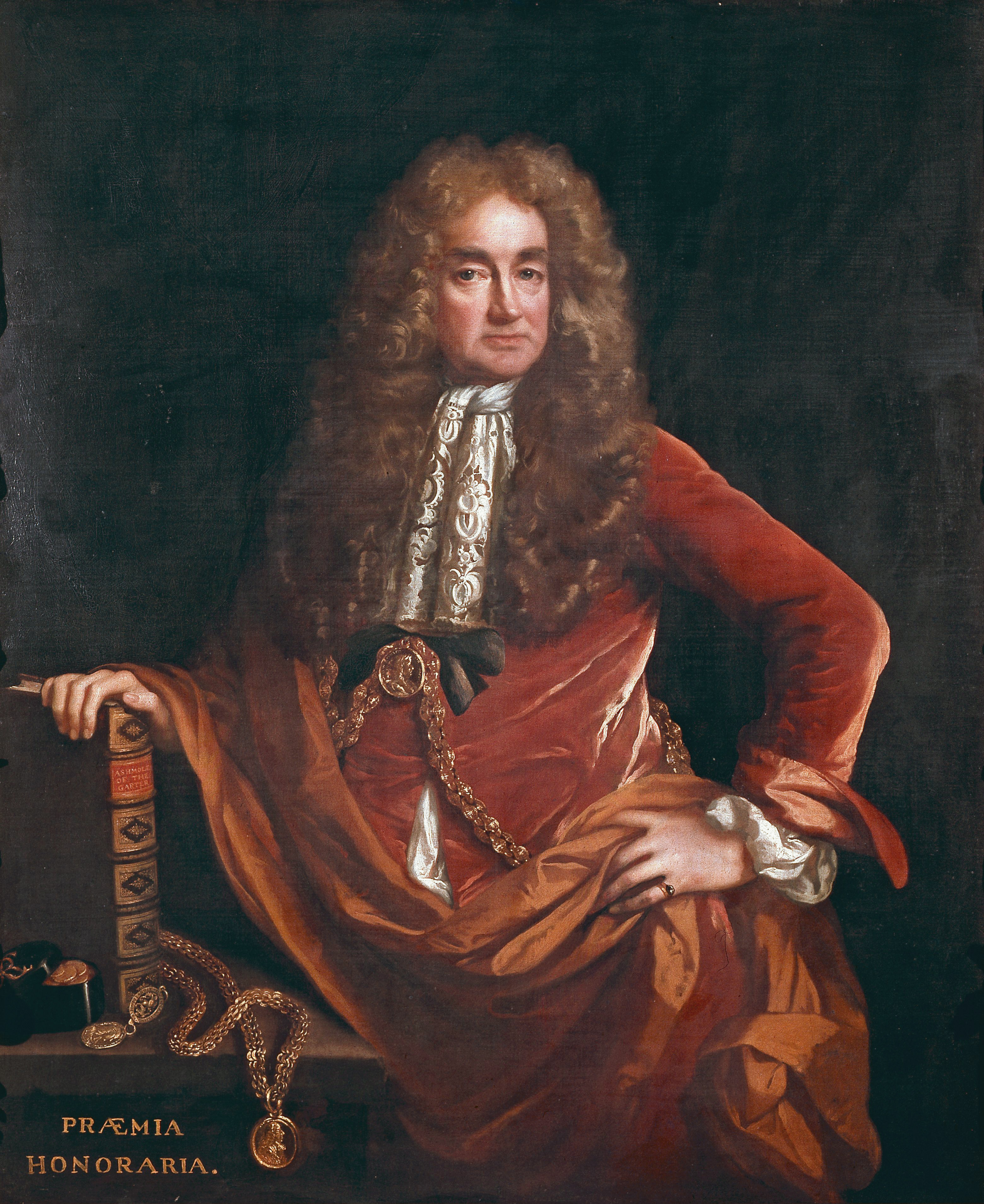
Portrait of Elias Ashmole, 1682

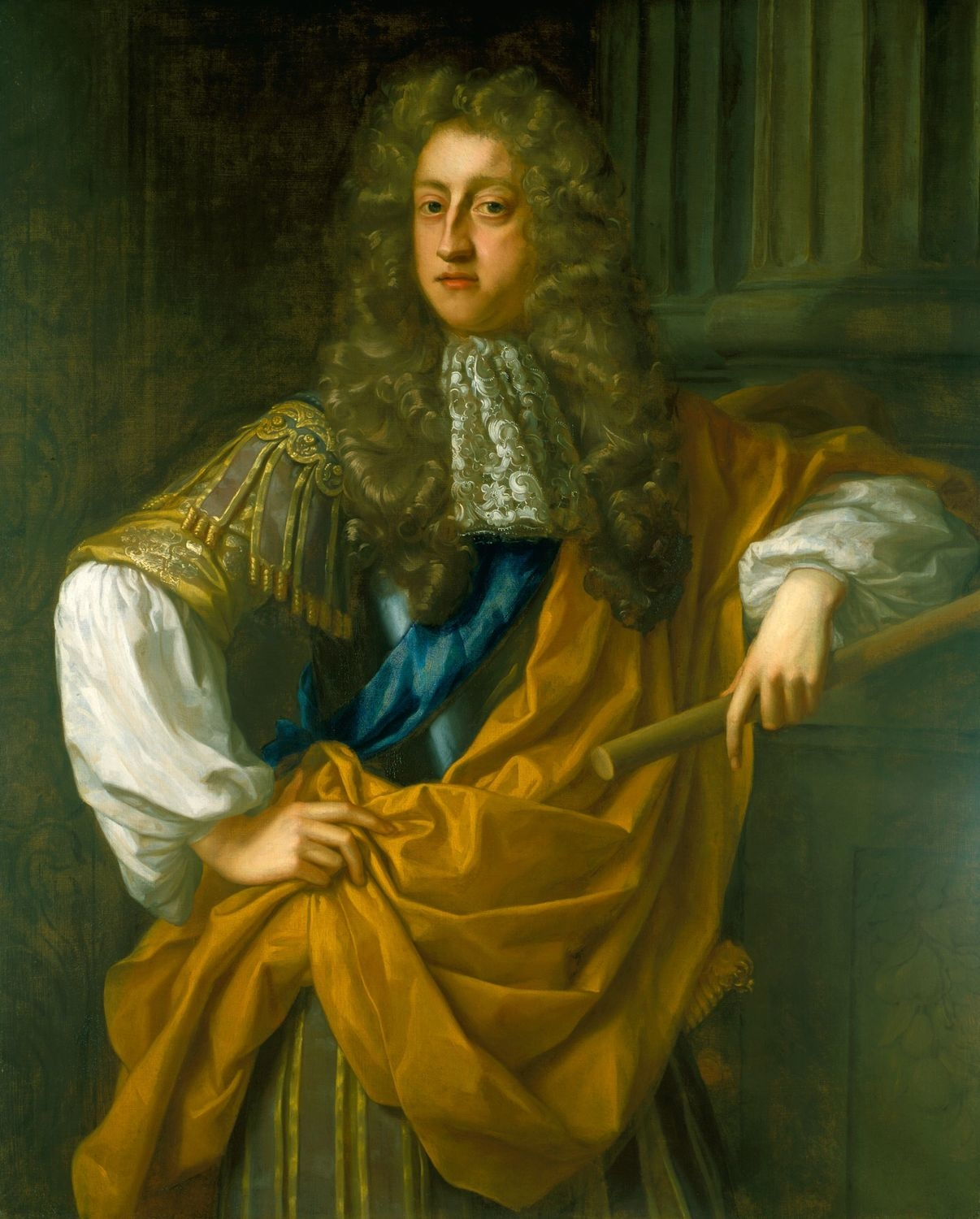
Prince George of Denmark, c.1689

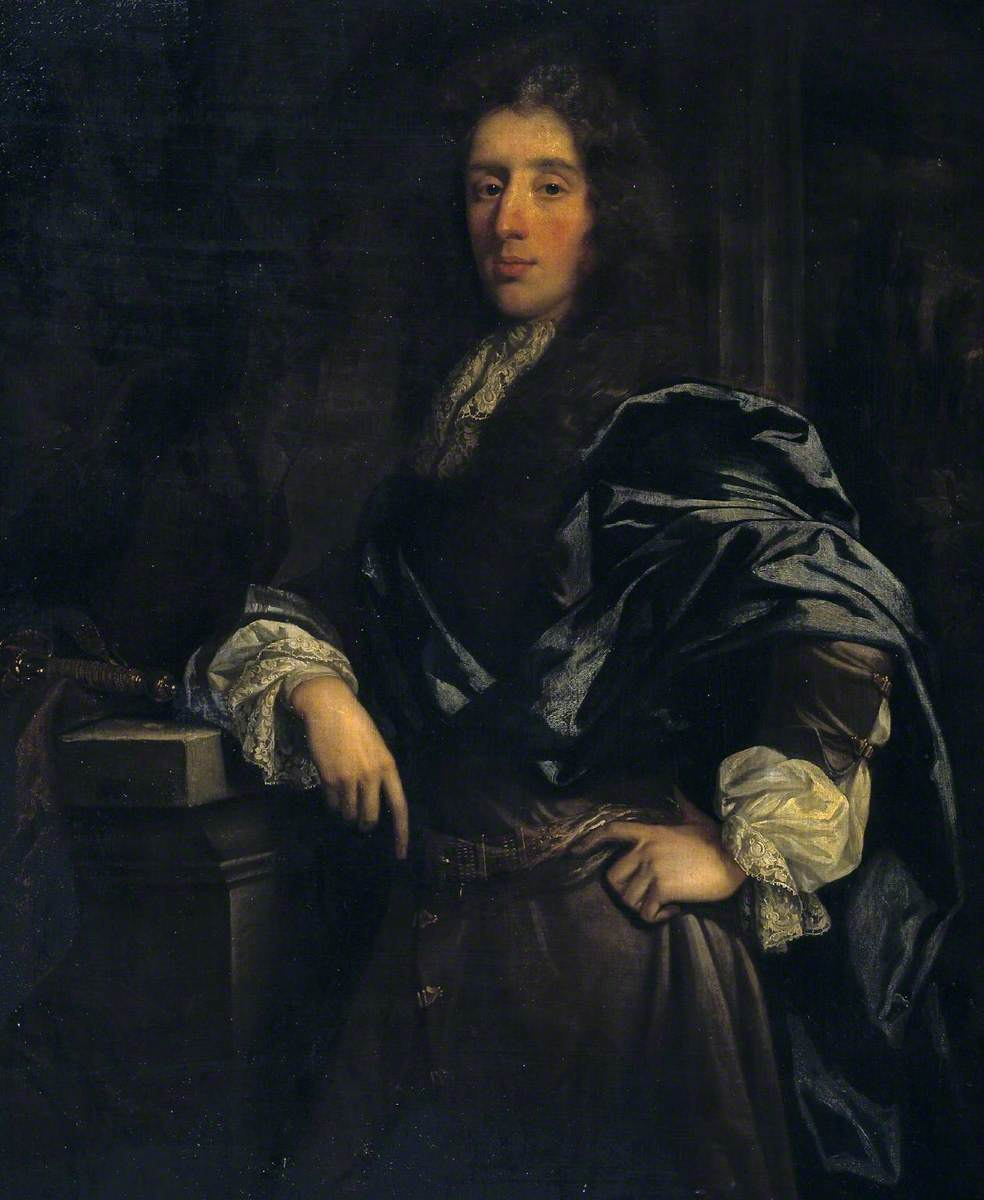
James Sotheby, 1690
