= Nicolas Colombel =

French painter (1644-1717)

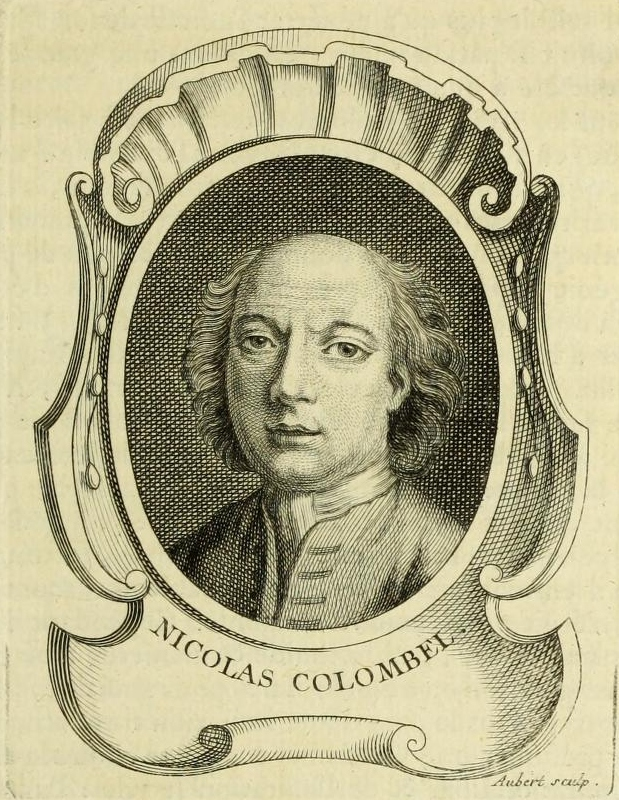
Portrait of Nicolas Colombel

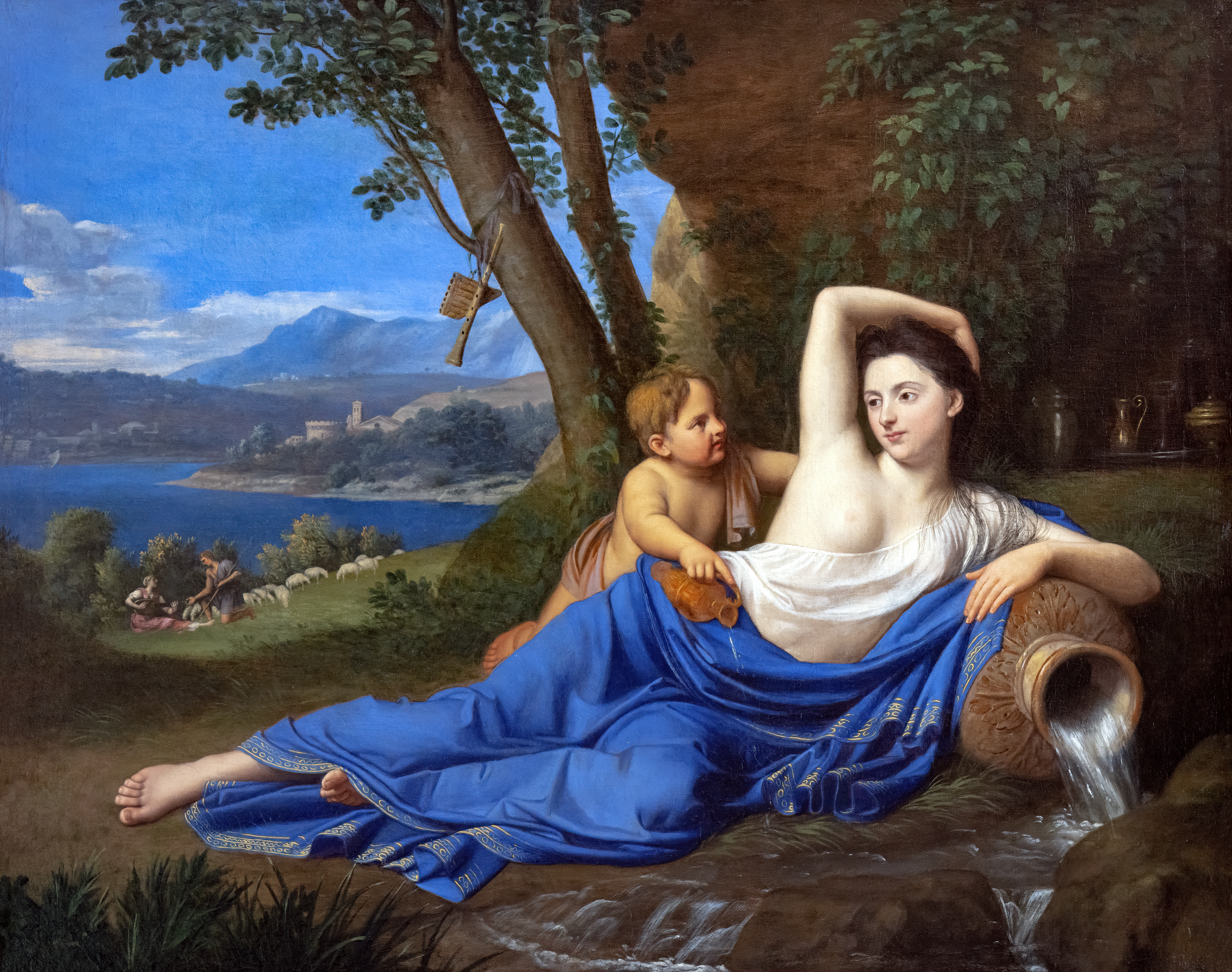
Portrait of a woman in the guise of Venus

Nicolas Colombel (c. 1644 – 1717) was a French painter, much influenced by Poussin.

== Life ==
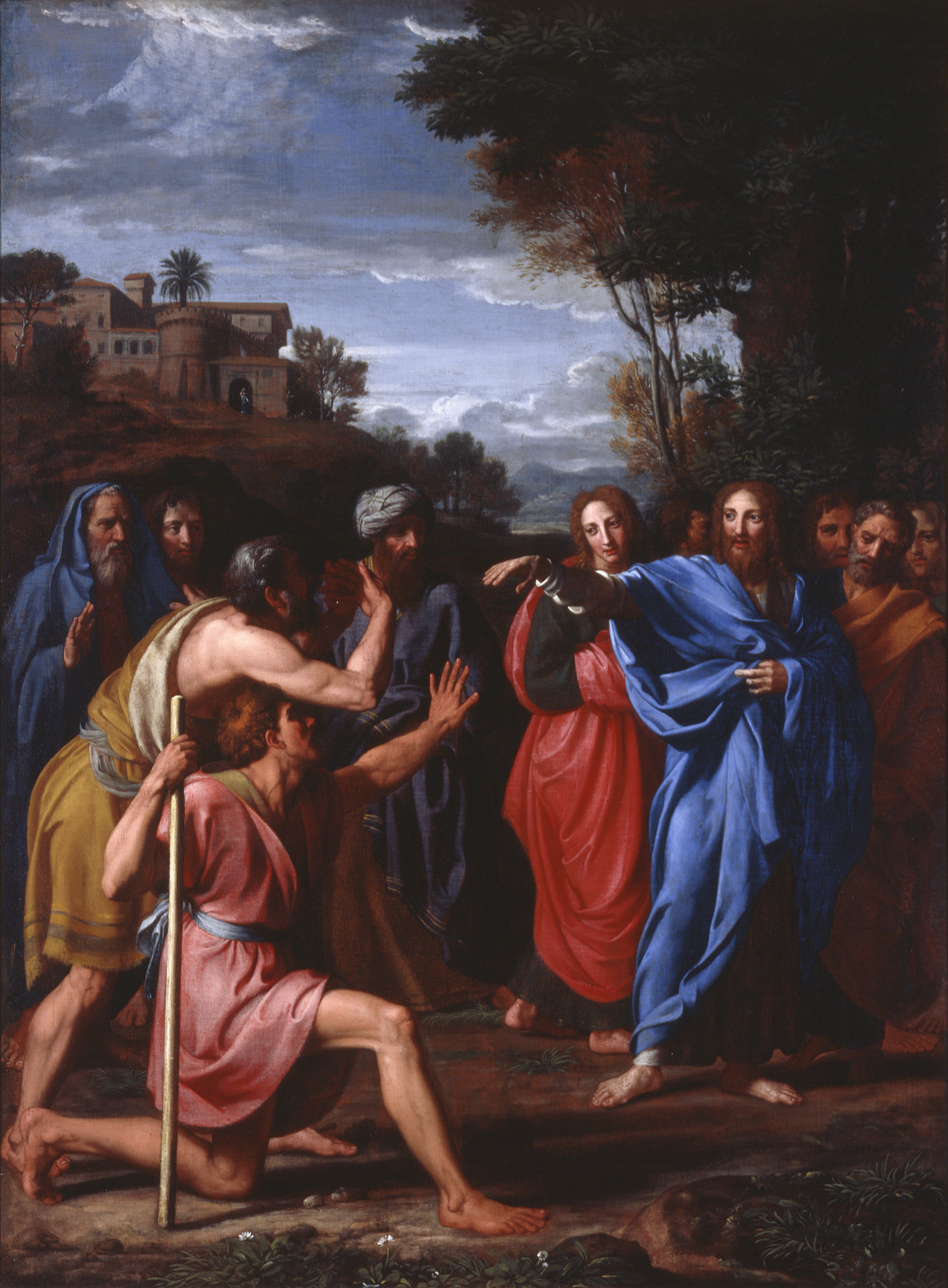
Christ healing the Blind, 1682, Saint Louis Art Museum

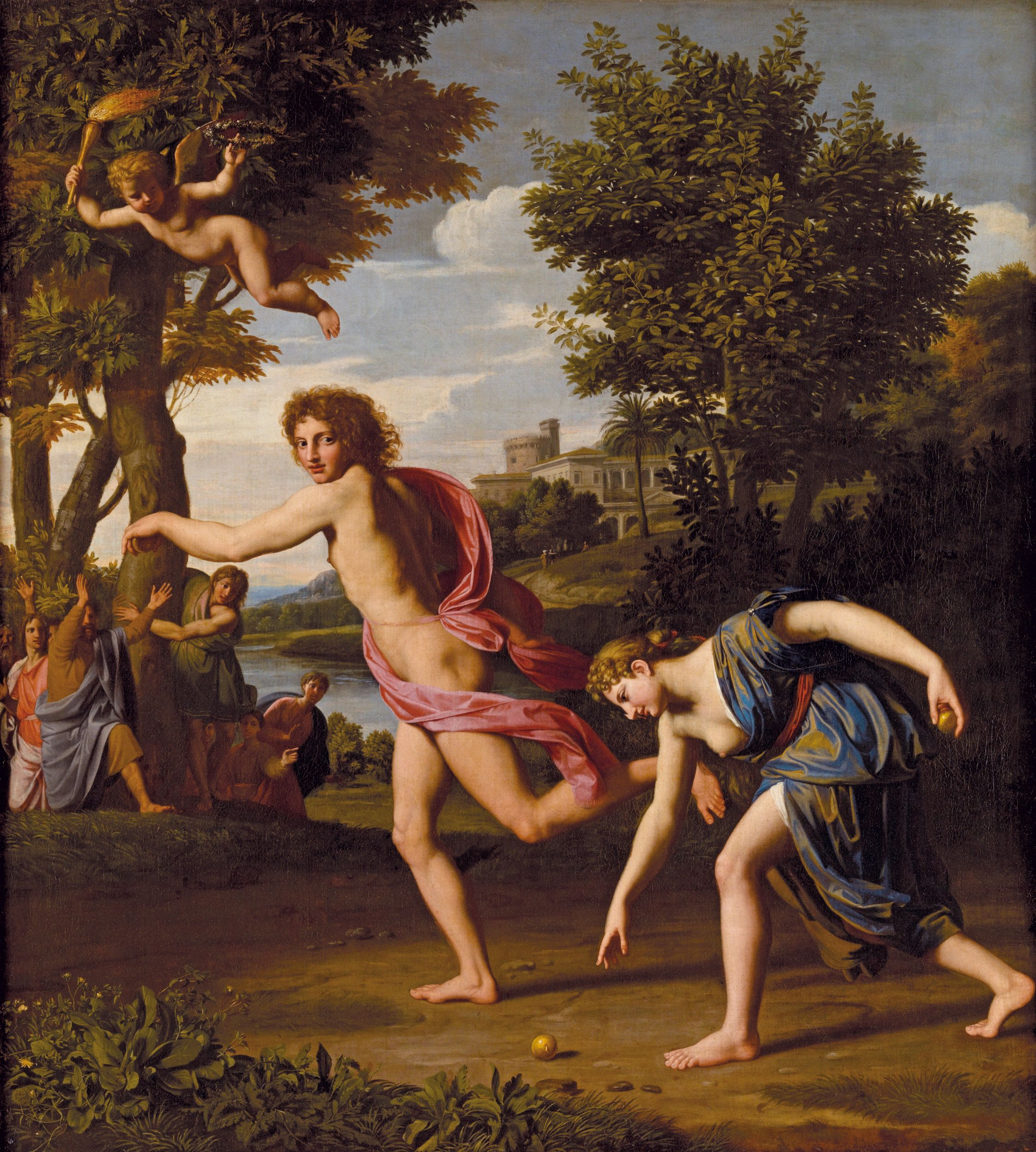
Atalante and Hippomenes, ca. 1680, Kunstmuseum Liechtenstein

Colombel was born at Sotteville, near Rouen, in the Province of Normandy in about 1644. He went to Rome when quite young, and remained there until 1692, forming his style by a study of the works of Raphael and Poussin. His pictures met with considerable success, but most later critics dismissed him as a mere imitator of Poussin.

He was admitted into the Academy of St Luke at Rome in 1686, and in 1694 into that of Paris. The Louvre possesses the Mars and Rhea Sylvia, which he painted for his reception to the Academy, and a work representing the Saint Hyacinth Saving the Statue of the Virgin from the Enemies of the Name of Christ. He was employed by Louis XIV at both Versailles and Meudon. Many of his works were engraved by Dufloc, and by Michel Dossier. He died in Paris in 1717.

Sir Edmund Head, writing in 1848, described Colombel as "in some sense a master who stood alone among his contemporaries in dignity of feeling, and in the solid character of his art." More recently, Didier Rykner has described his work as "generally easy to recognise", adding "[Colombel] does indeed have his own style, consisting in a gentle Classicism, at times a bit affected, a fondness for subtle and porcelain-like colors, deep blues (close to Sassoferrato)." A considerable number of paintings have been attributed to Colombel in recent years, including an altarpiece, Saint Dominic Presenting the Dominican Order to Christ, in the collection of the Musée des Beaux-Arts in Grenoble, identified in 2000. An exhibition of Colombel's work was held between November 2012 and February 2013 at the Musée des Beaux-Arts in Rouen.

== References and sources ==
Attribution:
