= James Makee =

American pioneer of Hawaiian sugar plantations

Captain James Makee (November 24, 1813 - September 16, 1879) was one of the pioneer planters of Hawaii and the owner of the most productive sugar plantations on Maui.

== Birth and early life ==
James Makee was born on November 24, 1813, in Woburn, Massachusetts, to John Makee and his wife Fanny (née Perry).

== Attack by steward ==
Makee (often recorded as Magee) captained the ninety-five foot whaling vessel "Maine" from Kennebunk, Maine into Maui in 1843. While just outside of Lahaina a ship's steward attacked Makee, striking him twice in the head with a hatchet. The steward fired a pistol at the second officer before presumably going overboard. Due to Makee's severe injuries, the Maine was forced to put into Honolulu to seek medical assistance from the "H.M.S. Carysfort" for their captain as well as a place for longer convalescence at port. William M. Smith was promoted and left Makee in Honolulu on April 29, 1843. Smith ended up in a bay at Queen Charlotte Sound. The decision to stop and take on whale during the off-season was not sanctioned and Makee prepared charges, the news of which spread quickly. On April 21, 1844, Smith, the acting captain of the Maine, left Queen Charlotte Sound towards Russian America. Smith had still not returned with the ship or crew after over year from the time of Makee's injuries and became the subject of an intense search initiated by the American consul in the Sandwich Islands. The ship finally reached Honolulu on October 26, 1844 with much damage. There is no record of "acting captain" Smith's fate.

== Sugar plantation ==
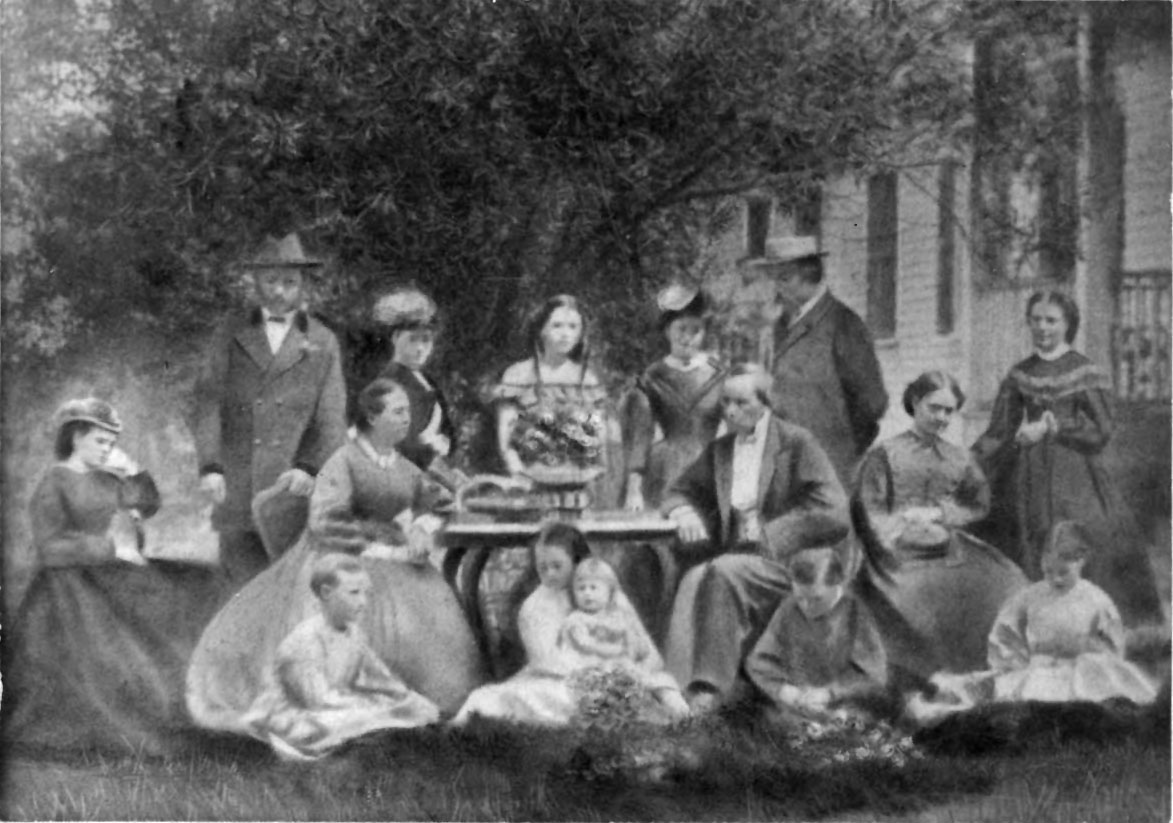
Captain James Makee and family at Ulupalakua, Maui

The ranch was originally named after the district it resided in, "Ulupalakua". Makee renamed it "Rose Ranch" after his wife's favorite flower. The plantation consisted of fifteen thousand acres on the slopes of Haleakala on the island of Maui. James Makee and Julius A. Anthon had been doing business as Makee, Anthon & Co until 1852. At that time they dissolved their shipping and commissions agency and completed construction of their last enterprise together. In 1853 construction began on the first pressed brick building in Honolulu with granite doorways, sill and steps, iron doors and shutters and considered fireproof, the Makee & Anthon Block. The structure was designed in Boston and shipped to Honolulu for construction.

The Makee Sugar company was owned by Makee, King David Kalakaua and other investors that had the company chartered in 1877. The company would eventually be run by Colonel Zephaniah Swift Spalding who married Makee's daughter.

== Personal life and family ==
James Makee married Catherine McNiven on March 14, 1836.
