= Giacinto de Popoli =

Italian painter

Giacinto de Popoli (died 1682 Orta di Atella o Caserta) was an Italian painter of the Baroque period, active near his natal city of Orta di Atella in the Province of Caserta. He was a pupil of Massimo Stanzioni.
