= Milano Due =

Milano 2
- Frazione
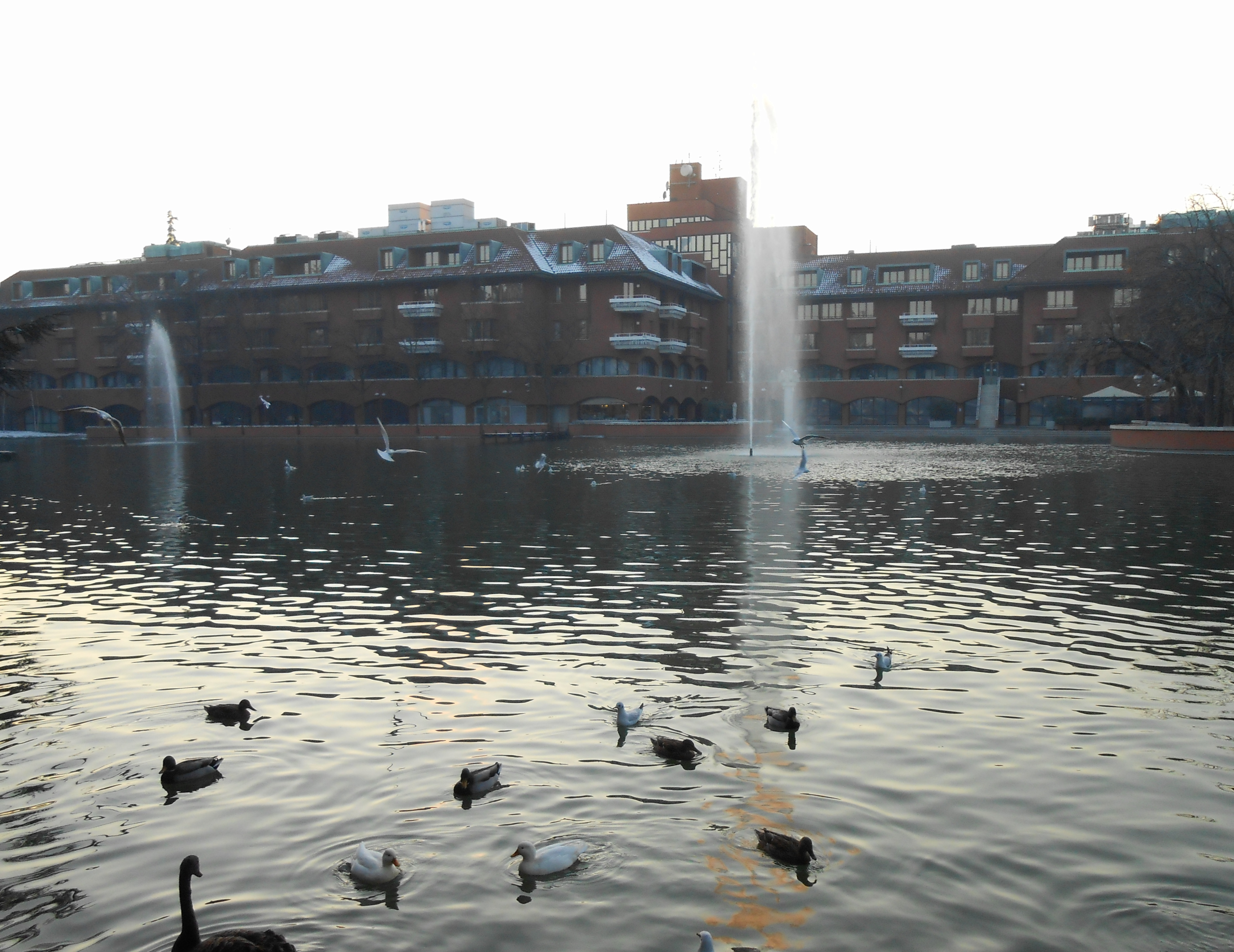
- The Laghetto

- Location of Milano 2 in Italy
- Coordinates: 45°29′57″N 09°15′55″E
- Country: Italy
- Region: Lombardy
- Province: Milan (MI)
- Comune: Segrate
- Elevation: 127 m (417 ft)

Population (2010)
  - Total: 6,087
- Time zone: UTC+1 (CET)
  - Summer (DST): UTC+2 (CEST)
- Postal code: 20054
- Dialing code: 02
- Website: https://www.milano2.it/

Milano 2 (also known as Milano Due) is a residential centre in the Italian town of Segrate (Province of Milan). It was built as a new town by Edilnord, a company associated with Silvio Berlusconi in the 1970s.

The main peculiarity of Milano 2 is its walkability: A system of walkways, cycle paths and bridges connects the whole neighbourhood so that it is possible to walk around without ever intersecting with vehicular traffic. It was marketed as a residential neighbourhood for families of the upper middle class with children.

== History ==
Work started on the project in 1971 and was completed in 1979. Distinctive landmarks of the complex include the sporting facilities, a small artificial lake (il laghetto), children's and adults' playgrounds, and lots of green areas so you can also think of living inside a park.

In May 2023, parts of the town, including the business centre were subject to flooding.

== Media ==
Milano 2 also hosted the headquarters of the first Italian private television channel, TeleMilanocavo, a small cable network that started broadcasting in the area in 1974. A few years later, it changed its name to Telemilano, and when Silvio Berlusconi bought it, it changed the name again to Canale 5, the first national private TV station.

== Notable people ==
Owners of property in the town have included Silvio Berlusconi and Marta Fascina.

== See also ==
- Lombardy
