= Pinamonte da Vimercate =

Consul of Milan
- In office 1171 - 1172
- In office 1183–1184
- Monarch: Frederick Barbarossa

Podestà of Bologna
- In office 1177–1179
- Monarch: Frederick Barbarossa

Personal details
- Born: c. 1120
- Died: after 1185

Pinamonte da Vimercate (c. 1120 – after 1185) was a Milanese nobleman, belonging to the class of Capitani, the highest rank of the communal nobility. He stood out as one of the most influential figures in the context of the struggles between the Lombard communes and the Holy Roman Empire. His family, the Vimercati, of Lombard origin, arrived in Vimercate from the Airuno area in the 11th century, taking on an important role in the protection of the parish church and the pieve of Vimercate.

== Biography ==
=== Early life and career ===
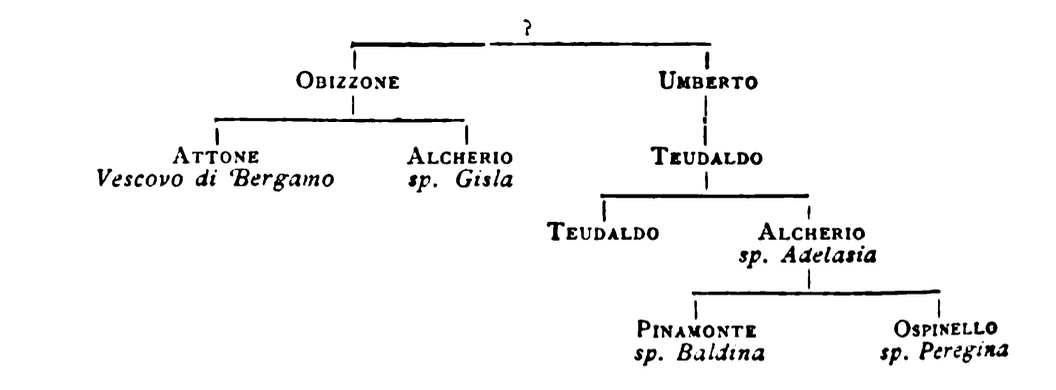
Family tree of Pinamonte da Vimercate.

Son of Alcherio da Vimercate, nephew of Teudaldo, Pinamonte first appears in historical sources in 1171-1172, when he held the position of consul of Milan (and again in 1183). During this period, Milan was recovering after the destruction caused by Emperor Frederick Barbarossa in 1162, and Pinamonte played a prominent role in the city's reconstruction. His name is recorded on a plaque that commemorates the rebuilding of Milan’s walls, a symbol of Milan’s rebirth. The reconstruction of the walls was not only a defensive work but also a sign of the city’s renewed strength and its political and commercial revival in northern Italy.

=== Role in the Lombard League ===
Pinamonte distinguished himself for his contribution to the founding of the Lombard League, a coalition of Italian cities formed to oppose the imperialism of Frederick Barbarossa. In 1158, he fought alongside his father Alcherio da Vimercate against the German forces at Cassano d'Adda, and tradition places him among the main speakers at the Oath of Pontida in 1167. It is said that his speech inspired the representatives of the Lombard cities to create the League, making him one of the founding fathers of this movement.

Although the historicity of the Pontida meeting has been questioned by modern historiography, which considers it more likely that the League arose in municipal and public venues, it is certain that Pinamonte was a key figure in the process of association among the Lombard cities. His commitment to the unity of the cities against the Empire made him one of the main actors in the political events of the time.

=== Diplomatic activity ===
In 1177, Pinamonte was elected podestà of Bologna and among the "rectores Lombardiae," a position that placed him at the head of other cities in Lombardy. His influence continued to grow, and in 1183 he was one of the signatories of the Treaty of Constance, which established peace between the Emperor and the Italian communes. Pinamonte represented the Comune of Milan and was among those who strongly defended the city's rights during the negotiations.

Pinamonte’s importance is also reflected in 1185, when he took part in the meeting with Frederick Barbarossa in Reggio Emilia, where, together with other Milanese consuls, he swore loyalty to him.

== Bibliography ==
- Cazzani, E. (1975). Storia di Vimercate. Vimercate: Penati.
- Riboldi, E. (1901). Pinamonte da Vimercate. Vimercate: Stucchi.
- Rotondi, G. (1894). Inizio della grande lega lombarda. Archivio storico lombardo, s. 3ª, II.
- Giulini, G. Storia diplomatica della lega lombarda.
- Alessandro Visconti, PINAMONTE da Vimercate, in Enciclopedia Italiana, Istituto dell'Enciclopedia Italiana, 1935.
- Pinamónte da Vimercate, su sapere.it, De Agostini.
- Maddalena Moglia, VIMERCATI, Pinamonte, in Dizionario biografico degli italiani, vol. 99, Istituto dell'Enciclopedia Italiana, 2020.
