= Princess Maria Luisa Carlota of Parma =

Maria Luisa Carlota
- Hereditary Princess of Saxony
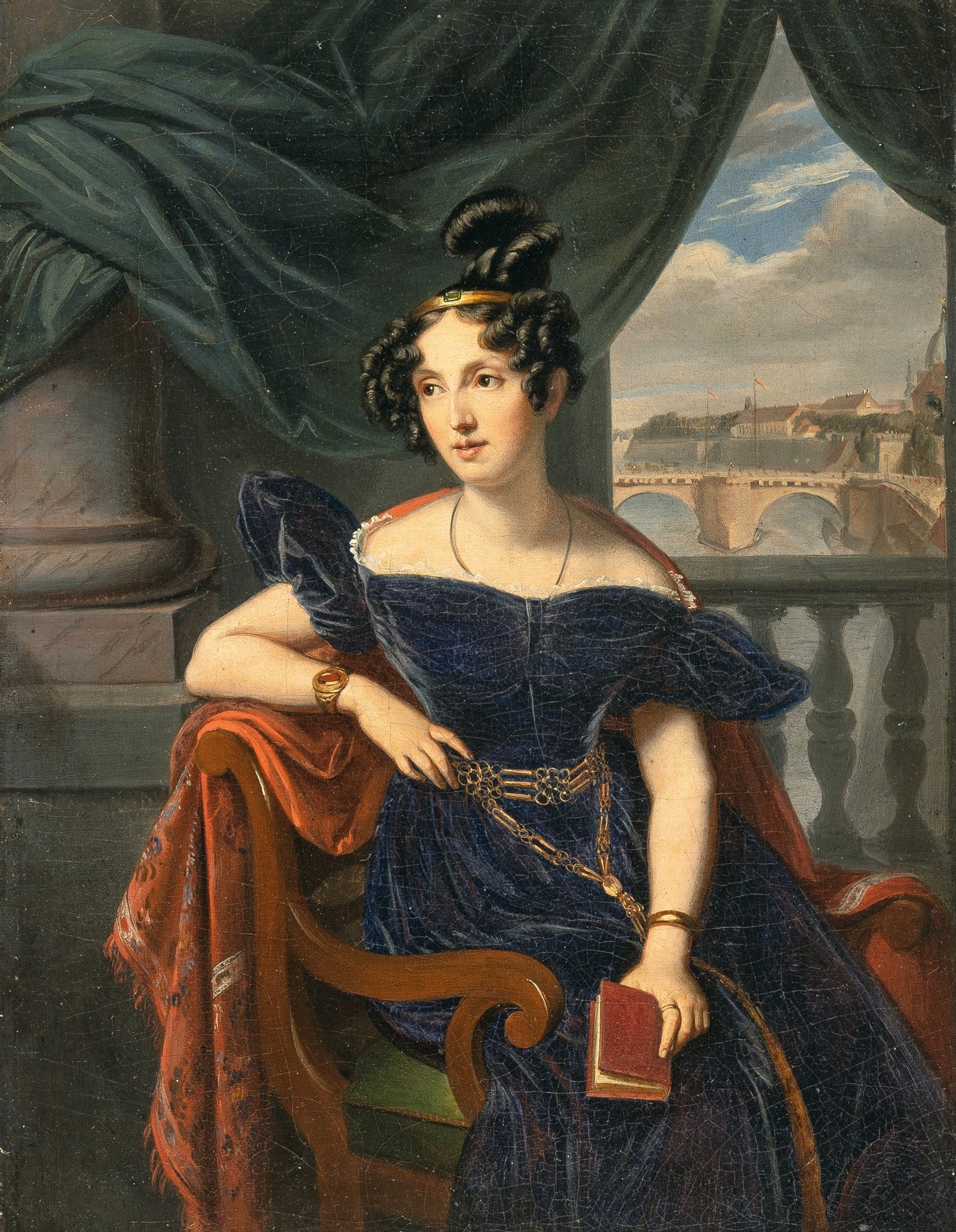
- Portrait by Carl Christian Vogel von Vogelstein, c. 1834
- Born: 2 October 1802; Barcelona, Spain
- Died: 18 March 1857 (aged 54); Rome, Papal States
- Burial: San Carlo ai Catinari
- Spouse: Maximilian, Hereditary Prince of Saxony (m. 1825; died 1838) Count Francesco Rossi (m. 1849; died 1854) Count Giovanni Vimercati (m. 1855)
- House: Bourbon-Parma
- Father: Louis I of Etruria
- Mother: Maria Luisa, Duchess of Lucca

Maria Luisa Carlota of Parma (2 October 1802 – 18 March 1857) was a Princess of Parma and member of the House of Bourbon. She was married to Maximilian, Hereditary Prince of Saxony until his death, and had two later husbands.

== Biography ==
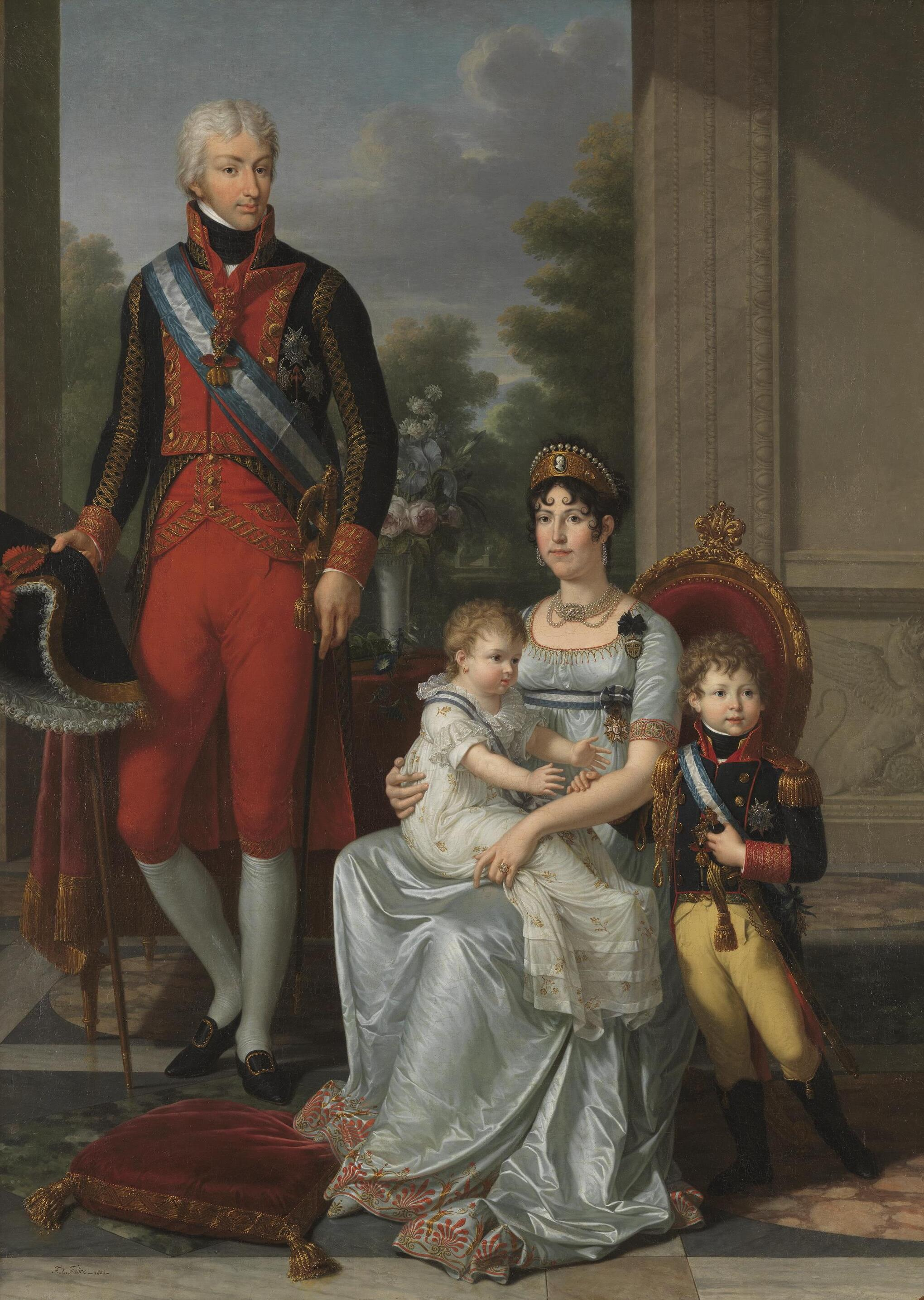
The Etrurian royal family (François-Xavier Fabre, 1804): Maria Luisa Carlota is held by her mother Maria Luisa. Her father Louis I at left, her brother Louis II at right.

Maria Luisa Carlota was born in Barcelona to then King Louis I of Etruria and Infanta Maria Luisa of Spain. The Spanish royal family were in the city to celebrate the marriage of her maternal uncle Ferdinand VII of Spain to Princess Maria Antonia of Naples on 6 October 1802.

Her mother, Maria Luisa, under difficulties gave birth to Maria Luisa Carlota (named after her deceased aunt, who had died four days before her mother's birth). At first, doctors thought that both mother and daughter would not survive.

Her maternal grandparents and her uncle Ferdinand VII wanted to marry Maria Luisa Carlota, then fourteen years old, to the Infante Francisco de Paula, Maria Luisa's youngest brother; the marriage never materialised.

Maria Luisa Carlota married Maximilian, Hereditary Prince of Saxony, the widower of her aunt Carolina of Parma, in Lucca on 15 October 1825 (by proxy) and again in Dresden on 7 November 1825. The couple had no children, and Maximilian renounced his rights to the throne in 1830. He died in 1838. Maria Luisa Carlota spent most of her life in Vienna, where she was known for her eccentricity. On 22 July 1849 she married again to a nobleman, Count Francesco Rossi, who died in 1854. On 19 February 1855 she married again, Count Giovanni Vimercati, by whom she had no issue and who outlived her, dying in 1861. She died in 1857, aged 54.

== Ancestors ==
Ancestors of Princess Maria Luisa Carlota of Parma

16. Philip V of Spain
8. Philip, Duke of Parma
17. Elisabeth Farnese
4. Ferdinand, Duke of Parma
18. Louis XV of France
9. Louise-Élisabeth of France
19. Marie Leszczyńska
2. Louis I of Etruria
20. Leopold, Duke of Lorraine
10. Francis I, Holy Roman Emperor
21. Élisabeth Charlotte of Orléans
5. Maria Amalia of Austria
22. Charles VI, Holy Roman Emperor
11. Maria Theresa of Austria
23. Elisabeth Christine of Brunswick
1. Maria Luisa Carlotta of Parma
24. Philip V of Spain (= 16)
12. Charles III of Spain
25. Elisabeth Farnese (= 17)
6. Charles IV of Spain
26. Augustus III of Poland
13. Maria Amalia of Saxony
27. Maria Josepha of Austria
3. Maria Luisa, Duchess of Lucca
28. Philip V of Spain (= 16, 24)
14. Philip, Duke of Parma (= 8)
29. Elisabeth Farnese (= 17, 25)
7. Maria Luisa of Parma
30. Louis XV of France (= 18)
15. Louise-Élisabeth of France (= 9)
31. Marie Leszczyńska (= 19)
