= House of Vimercati =

Italian noble family

Vimercati
- Noble house
- Country: Italy
- Current region: Lombardy
- Origin: Vimercate
- Founded: XI century
- Founder: Pinamonte da Vimercate
- Titles: Bishop (non hereditary); Count of Palazzo Pignano; Count of Castel Palazzo; Count of Cornate; Count; Count of Vimercate (non hereditary); Count of Valenza (non hereditary); Capitano del popolo (Vimercate); Vassal-in-chief of the H.R.I. (Vimercate); Senator of the Duchy of Milan (non hereditary); Senator of the Kingdom of Italy (non hereditary); Noble
- Cadet branches: Vimercati of Crema; Vimercati Sanseverino of Crema; Vimercati Sozzi; Vimercati of Verona

The House of Vimercati (de Capitani da Vimercate) is one of the oldest Italian noble families from Lombardy (dating back to the XI century), originating from the city of Vimercate in the Brianza region and descended from the Lombards.

The family was more than just a local participant, as it played a role in several historical events. Protagonists in the fight of the Italian Comuni against Emperor Barbarossa, then closely linked with the Sforza family, contributing to their rise and consolidation of power, and was involved in various conflicts that characterized the Middle Ages and the early modern period. During the Renaissance, its patronage and strategic alliances supported the cultural and artistic development of the region, while during the Risorgimento the family became part of the processes that led to Italian unification and the establishment of the Kingdom of Italy. Its influence, therefore, extended beyond local boundaries, making it a component of the country's political, cultural, and social history.

== Origins and history ==
The Vimercati family is one of the oldest and most illustrious Lombard lineages, descended from the ancient lords of Airuno, with documented origins dating back to the early decades of the 11th century. The name derives from the city of Vimercate, where they were invested with the captaincy of the parish. The earliest mentions already appear in 1021 with Arialdo and Alcherio as feudal holder of the court of Cisano near Pontida. While in 1088 Algiso Vimercati was appointed valvassore maggiore by Emperor Henry IV of the fief of Vimercate.

Around 1050, Obizzone and Uberto da Vimercate are attested in Milan. Obizzone is recorded as the father of Alchiero and Attone, Bishop of Bergamo. From the other branch, Uberto is recorded as the father of Teudaldo. The latter appears in a donation to the church of San Fedele (1095), in 1104, and again in 1147, with his sons Teudaldo and Alcherio.

Alcherio was a Milanese commander who led the city’s troops in the Battle of Cassano d’Adda (1158), where he was taken prisoner and died in captivity. His son Pinamonte Vimercati († after 1185) was one of the most eminent figures of the Milanese Commune: consul in 1171, the year of the city’s reconstruction after its destruction by Barbarossa, and again in 1183. He took an active part in the Lombard League, leading Milan to the victory of Legnano (1176), and was among the signatories of the Peace of Constance (1183) and the Treaty of Reggio (1185), which secured greater autonomy for Lombard communes. Chronicles, albeit partly legendary, remember him as a promoter of the Oath of Pontida.

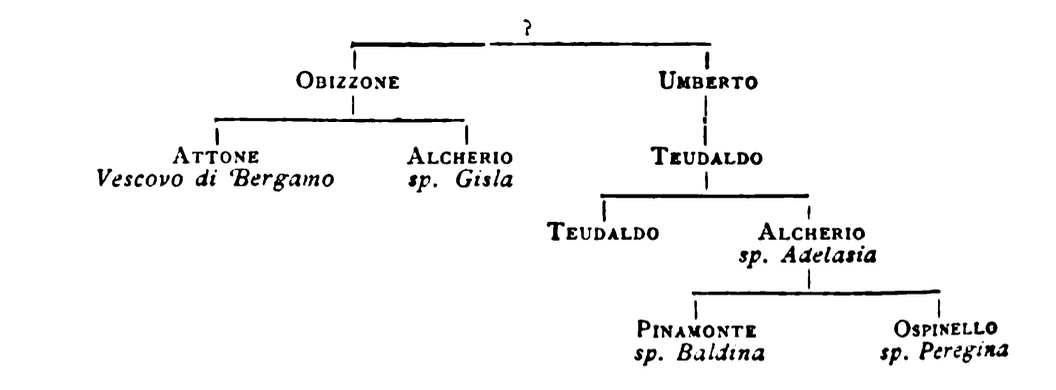
Albero Genealogico Pinamonte da Vimercate.

Pinamonte’s son, Guido (also known as Grazio), carried on his political legacy, serving as consul of Milan (1192, 1224) and as podestà of Vicenza (1195) and Bologna (1196). Later, the family was listed in the 1277 Register of Ancient Milanese Nobility, from which the ordinary canons of the Cathedral were chosen.

Among the derived branches of the Capitani da Vimercate are the Vimercati Sanseverino of Crema, the Vimercati Sozzi of Bergamo, the Merosi, the captains of Lavello, and those of Hoè (Brianza).

=== Capitani da Vimercate (Milan) ===
The family consistently enjoyed Milanese patriciate status and the style of Don and Donna and was declared noble in 1412 by Duke Filippo Maria Visconti.

In the modern era the State confirmed the family’s noble rights by Royal Decree of 5 November 1926; later, by R.D. of 13 February 1939, the title of Count (hereditary by primogeniture) was conferred upon Francesco, son of Antonio.

=== The Crema Branch ===
Coat of arms of the Vimercati family of Crema.

From Pinamonte’s line sprang several branches, settled both in Milan and in Crema, where they established themselves between the 13th and 14th centuries. Already in the 14th century, the Vimercati of Crema ranked among the most influential families, aligned with the Guelph party and supporters of the Benzoni. In 1351, Pietro Vimercati was among the fourteen founders of the Ospedale Maggiore of Porta Ripalta. Other men of culture followed, such as Taddeolo Vimercati (lecturer in Pavia in 1382) and Giovanni Vimercati (1446).

During the struggles between Guelphs and Ghibellines, in 1402, upon the death of Galeazzo Visconti, Marcotto Vimercati was sent as ambassador to Milan and narrowly escaped a Ghibelline assassination attempt. The following year, in 1403, Giovanni, Giovannino, and Cremano Vimercati took part in the assembly that elected the Benzoni as lords of Crema. Particularly notable was Gaspare Vimercati, commissioner of the Republic of Milan in Crema in 1447 and a captain in the service of Francesco Sforza. Many members of the house served as ambassadors and secretaries of the Milanese Republic.

In the 15th century, other prominent figures emerged:

- Nicolò Vimercati (†1447), knight under Braccio da Montone and commander in the service of the Republic of Florence;
- Luigi the Elder, sent to Venice in 1450, author of a famous speech to Doge Francesco Foscari requesting the annexation of Crema to the Serenissima;
- Francesco Vimercati, podestà in various Italian cities, including Mantua, Reggio, and Florence, where he married a Malatesta;
- Agostino Vimercati (†1517), lieutenant of Gubbio, podestà of Ravenna, and extraordinary magistrate of the Duchy of Milan.

=== The Union with the Sanseverino ===
A crucial moment came in 1528, when Sermone Vimercati, Senator of the Duchy of Milan and knight, married Countess Ippolita Sanseverino, daughter of Ugo, 3rd Count of Saponara, Lord of Pandino, Lugano, Mendrisio, Ghemme, and Morcote, Senator of Milan, and General of Galeazzo Sforza. The dowry brought the Vimercati part of the county of Pandino, enlarging the estates of Palazzo Pignano, and the family created a new branch by adding to its name that of the Sanseverino, an ancient Norman lineage that had settled in Lombardy in the 15th century.

From this marriage was born a new Cremasque branch and Marcantonio Vimercati, a valiant commander in the War of Cyprus under Venetian banners. In 1577, Doge Sebastiano Venier invested him with the title of Count of Palazzo Pignano (or Parasio), transmissible to both male and female descendants. His brothers Ottaviano and Lodovico were also military leaders: Lodovico, governor of Zara and colonel of Friuli, died in Corfu in 1614, receiving solemn funerals at the expense of the Republic of Venice.

=== From the 17th Century to the Modern Age ===
In the 17th century, the family consolidated its prestige in military, diplomatic, and ecclesiastical careers. Giovan Battista Vimercati Sanseverino, nephew of Count Annibale, served in Savoy alongside his brother Lodovico; Giovanni Andrea Vimercati was chamberlain to Pope Julius III. Many members entered the Sacred Military Order of Jerusalem, with chronicles recording at least seven knights.

Beyond the military sphere, the house provided eminent churchmen and jurists: Cesare Vimercati, archdeacon and founder of the Accademia dei Sospinti in Crema, and Sacred Military Order of Jerusalem (Malta), with chronicles recording at least seven knights. The family also counted benefactors, such as Massimo Vimercati, who in 1704 left substantial assets to the Ospedale degli Infermi.

During the Risorgimento, Ottaviano Vimercati (1815–1879) distinguished himself, fighting in Algeria, Crimea, and the wars of independence, and as a protagonist of the Five Days of Milan. A trusted man of Camillo Benso di Cavour, he was extraordinary envoy to the court of Napoleon III. King Victor Emmanuel II called him “the First Lombard.”

=== The Collateral Branches ===
Among the collateral branches, the Vimercati Sozzi of Bergamo should be remembered, descendants of a line exiled from the Duchy of Milan and settled in the Bergamo area. In 1681 they obtained the title of Counts of Cornate by purchasing the eponymous fief.

Another branch, descended from Lodovico, settled in Rome in the 17th century. Among its members were Faustino Vimercati Sanseverino (1801–1878), a patriot of the Five Days of Milan and Senator of the Kingdom of Italy, and his son Alfonso (1836–1907), political prefect of Naples. In 1855 Giovanni Vimercati married in Rome Princess Luigia Carlotta of Bourbon, Duchess of Saxony and Infanta of Spain.

== Titles and holdings ==
Over the centuries, several members of the family were granted noble titles, including those of Counts and marquises. The Vimercati owned numerous lands and properties throughout northern Italy, including the Palazzo Vimercati in Milan, one of the most notable examples of their architectural heritage. The palace, located on Via Carlo Ottavio Cornaggia, is a symbol of the family's power and wealth in the Lombard capital.

== Relationships and marriages ==
The Vimercati family further strengthened its status through marriages with other noble Lombard houses. Notable examples of these families are the Lords and Dukes Visconti, the Lords and Marquises Benzoni, the Princes and Dukes Sanseverino, the Princes and Counts Porcia, the Marquises Zurla, the Marquises and Counts Palatine Premoli, the Counts Bonzi, the Carioni, the Pojani, and the Lords and Marquises Secco.

Undoubtedly, the most important union, from which the Vimercati Sanseverino branch originated, took place in 1528, when Sermone Vimercati of Crema married Countess Ippolita Sanseverino, daughter of Ugo, 3rd Count of Saponara, Lord of Pandino, Lugano, Mendrisio, Ghemme, and Morcote, Senator of the Duchy of Milan, and General of Galeazzo Sforza. She belonged to one of the most illustrious families of the Kingdom of Naples, and among the noblest in Italy.

Another important marriage took place in 1855 in Rome when Giovanni Vimercati married Maria Luisa Carlotta of Bourbon-Parma, a member of the prestigious Bourbon royal house.

We also recall the marriage that took place in 1738 between Valeria Vimercati and Count Ercole Bonzi, Count of Serio, a prestigious and ancient noble family from the city of Crema.

== Ecclesiastical ties ==
Several members of the Vimercati family held prominent positions in the ecclesiastical sphere as well. Some family members were appointed bishops and abbots, thereby increasing the family's influence not only politically but also religiously. Their presence in Lombardy's ecclesiastical institutions was constant and significant, helping to solidify their image as a moral and spiritual authority.

== Branches ==
Several branches of the Vimercati family emerged as they expanded from the Milan branch, each following distinct paths that shaped their noble legacy.

One branch of the family settled in Crema, giving rise to notable figures such as Gaspare, Ottaviano, Giovanni, and Agostino Vimercati. Over time, this branch split into several offshoots, the most distinguished being the Vimercati Sanseverino line. The prestige derives from the union with the Sanseverino house, one of the most illustrious families of the Kingdom of Naples, and among the noblest in Italy, and for the services rendered to the Republic of Venice. In 1574 Doge Sebastiano Venier granted them the title of Count of Palazzo or Parazzo.

Another branch, having rebelled against the Dukes of Milan, took refuge in Bergamo under the name Sozzi. However, over the course of the 17th century, they reclaimed their original surname, giving rise to the Vimercati Sozzi line, which, from 1681, held the title of Counts of Cornate.

A third branch, settled in Verona.

== Coat of arms ==
- Capitani da Vimercate: Party per fess: 1st azure, an eagle sable; 2nd gules, a round castle argent strengthened with a little turret; the castle and the tower embattled Ghibelline.
- Vimercati of Milan: Red, with a silver castle with three towers, the central one being the tallest, open and windowed in the field; the chief in gold, with a black eagle crowned in the field.
- Vimercati-Sanseverino of Crema: Red, with three gold bands; the chief in blue, charged with two gold stars.
- Vimercati of Verona: Gold, with three red bands, the chief in blue.
- Vimercati-Sozzi of Bergamo: Golden, with a black double-headed eagle, crowned on both heads; divided into silver and red, with a castle having two battlemented towers in the Guelf style, open and windowed of the field, surmounted by two facing roosters, all alternated in colors; with a green uprooted cypress, crossing.

== List of notable members ==
- Arialdo Vimercati (11th century): One of the earliest known members of the family, mentioned in documents from 1021.
- Algiso Vimercati (11th century): In 1088, he was a vassal of Emperor Henry IV, strengthening the connection between the Vimercati family and the Holy Roman Empire.
- Pinamonte da Vimercate (12th century – after 1183): Consul of Milan in 1171 and 1183, during a key period for the city following its destruction by Frederick Barbarossa in 1162 and the subsequent Peace of Constance (1183). He was key promoter of the Lombard League and fought in the Battle of Legnano. He also served as podestà of Bologna in 1176.
- Guido Vimercati (12th-13th century): Figlio of Pinamonte, he was consul of Milan in 1192 and 1224. He also held the positions of podestà of Vicenza (1195) and podestà of Bologna (1196), confirming the family's political influence in various northern Italian cities.
- Gaspare da Vimercate (15th century – 1467): A military leader and advisor to Duke Francesco Sforza, he participated in the conquest of Milan in 1450, contributing to the fall of the Ambrosian Republic. In 1452, he was appointed Count of Valenza and Count of Vimercate and became responsible for the duchy's finances and founded the convent of Santa Maria delle Grazie.
- Sermone Vimercati (the Younger) (16th century): Senator of Milan and knight. In 1528, he married Ippolita Sanseverino, uniting the fortunes of the two families and establishing the branch of the Vimercati Sanseverino.
- Lodovico Vimercati (17th century): A military officer who served first in the Duchy of Savoy and later in the Republic of Venice, distinguishing himself in various wars of the period.
- Faustino Vimercati (1801–1878): A patriot and conspirator, he participated in the Italian Risorgimento. After the unification of Italy, he became a Senator of the Kingdom of Italy.
- Alfonso Vimercati (1836–1907): Son of Faustino, he followed in his father's footsteps and also served as a Senator of the Kingdom of Italy.
- Ottaviano Vimercati (1815–1879): Milanese officer and diplomat, veteran of the French campaigns in Algeria and the wars of the Italian Risorgimento, he was a trusted confidant of Cavour. As special envoy to Napoleon III, he contributed to the Franco-Piedmontese alliance for the Second War of Independence. He stood alongside Garibaldi during the 1860 central Italian campaign and later negotiated in Paris the recognition of the Kingdom of Italy and the withdrawal of French troops from Rome. He was appointed Senator of the Kingdom in 1879.
- Agostino Vimercati (1813–1886): Knight of the Order of St. John of Jerusalem and of the Crown of Italy. Donated in death twenty thousand lire to the Institute of Mercy and another twenty thousand to the Infant Asylums. He also left one thousand lire to be distributed among the poor of the city. Great-uncle of Antonio Bonzi Vimercati.
- Giovanni Vimercati (?-?): In 1855 married in Rome Maria Luisa Carlotta of Bourbon-Parma.

== Residences ==
Of the homes built and inhabited by the Vimercati family, the following are particularly memorable:

- Palazzo Vimercati, historic residence in Milan
- Palazzo Marazzi formerly Vimercati, historic residence of Crema
- Palazzo Barbàra formerly Vimercati, historic residence of Crema
- Palazzo Vimercati Sanseverino, historic residence of Crema
- Palazzo Donati De' Conti (formerly Vimercati Sanseverino and Vimercati), historic residence in via Vimercati in Crema
- Palazzo Bonzi (formerly Benvenuti, Vimercati), historic building in via Giacomo Matteotti in Crema.
- Villa Vimercati Sanseverino called the Palace, historic residence of Vaiano Cremasco
- Villa Vimercati Groppallo Castelbarco, historic residence of Torlino Vimercati .
- Vimercati-Sozzi Castle, a ruined castle in the municipality of Cisano Bergamasco .

== See also ==
- Visconti of Milan
- Filippo Maria Visconti
- St. Mary of Grace
