= Maria Luisa, Duchess of Lucca =

Spanish infanta (1782-1824)

Maria Luisa of Spain
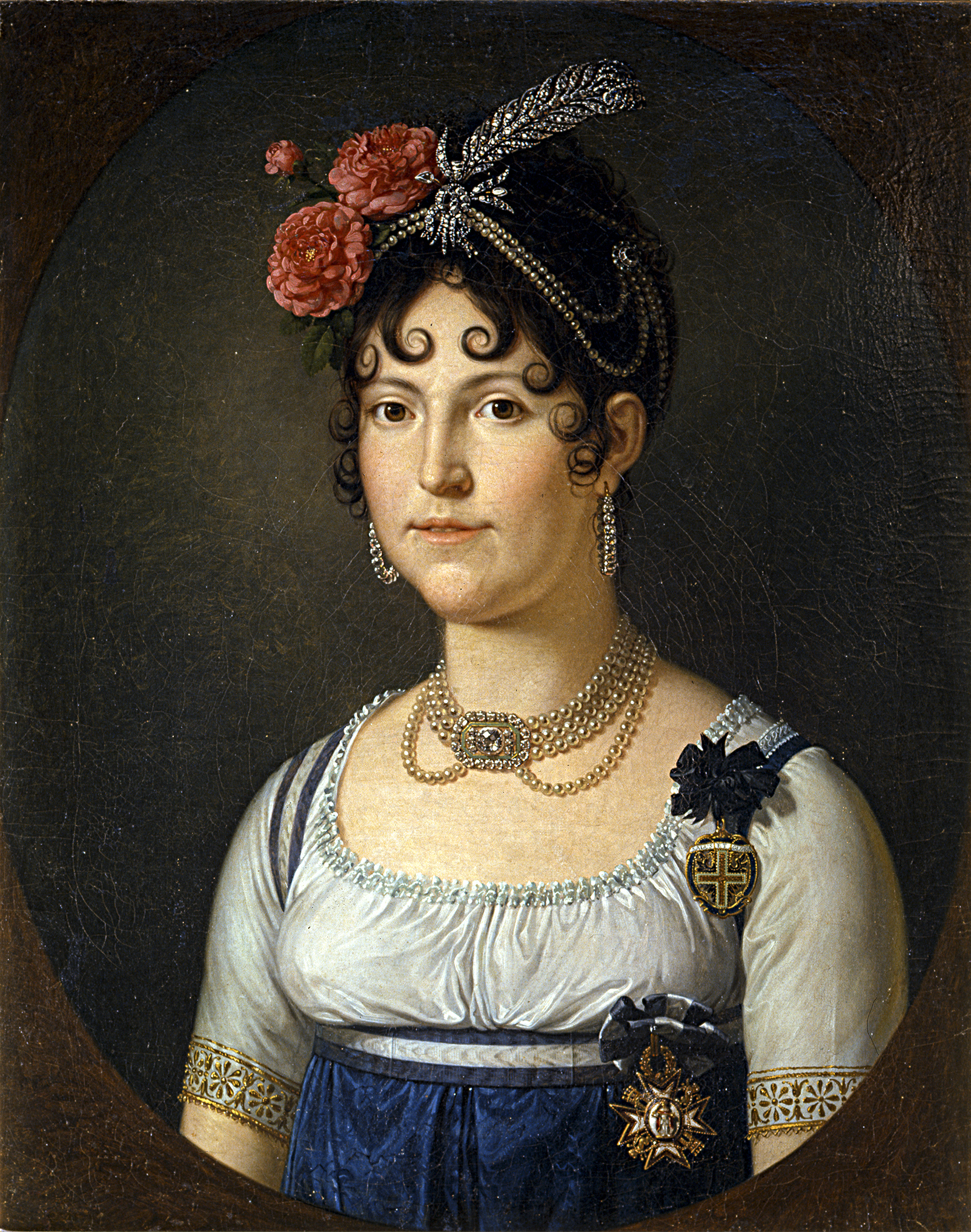
- Portrait by François-Xavier Fabre, 1801

Queen consort of Etruria
- Tenure: 21 March 1801 – 27 May 1803

Queen regent of Etruria
- Regency: 27 May 1803 – 10 December 1807
- Monarch: Louis II

Duchess of Lucca
- Reign: 22 November 1817 – 13 March 1824
- Successor: Charles Louis
- Born: 6 July 1782; Palace of San Ildefonso, Segovia, Spain
- Died: 13 March 1824 (aged 41); Rome, Papal States
- Burial: El Escorial, Madrid
- Spouse: Louis I of Etruria (m. 1795; died 1803)
- Issue: Charles II, Duke of Parma; Maria Luisa Carlota, Hereditary Princess of Saxony
Names
- Spanish: María Luisa Josefina Antonieta Vicenta de Borbón y Borbón-Parma
- House: Bourbon
- Father: Charles IV of Spain
- Mother: Maria Luisa of Parma
- Religion: Roman Catholicism

Maria Luisa of Spain (Spanish pronunciation: [maˈɾi.a ˈlwisa], 6 July 1782 – 13 March 1824) was a Spanish infanta, daughter of King Charles IV and Maria Luisa of Parma. In 1795, she married her first cousin Louis of Bourbon-Parma, heir apparent to the Duchy of Parma. She spent the first years of her married life at the Spanish court where their first child, Charles Louis, was born.

In 1801, the Treaty of Aranjuez made her husband King of Etruria, a kingdom created from the former Grand Duchy of Tuscany in exchange for the renunciation of the Duchy of Parma. They arrived in Florence, the capital of the new kingdom, in August 1801. During a brief visit to Spain in 1802, Maria Luisa gave birth to her second child. Her husband's reign in Etruria was marred by his ill health. He died in 1803 at the age of 30, following an epileptic crisis. Maria Luisa acted as regent for their son. During her government in Florence, she tried to gain the support of her subjects, but her administration of Etruria was cut short by Napoleon Bonaparte, who forced her to leave with her children in December 1807. As part of the Treaty of Fontainebleau, Napoleon incorporated Etruria to his domains.

After a futile interview with Napoleon in Milan, Maria Luisa looked for refuge in exile with her family in Spain. The Spanish court was deeply divided and a month after her arrival the country was thrown into unrest when a popular uprising, known as the Mutiny of Aranjuez, forced Maria Luisa's father to abdicate in favor of her brother Ferdinand VII. Napoleon invited father and son to Bayonne, France, with the excuse of acting as a mediator, but gave the kingdom to his brother Joseph. Napoleon called the remaining members of the Spanish royal family to France and at their departure on 2 May 1808, the citizens of Madrid rose up against the French occupation. In France, Maria Luisa was reunited in exile with her parents. She was the only member of the Spanish royal family to oppose Napoleon directly. After her secret plan to escape was discovered, Maria Luisa was separated from her son and placed with her daughter as prisoners in a Roman convent.

Maria Luisa, mostly known as the Queen of Etruria during her lifetime, regained her freedom in 1814 at the fall of Napoleon. In the following years, she continued to live in Rome, hoping to recover her father-in-law's former domains. To put forward her case, she wrote a book of memoirs, but was disappointed when the Congress of Vienna (1814–15) compensated her not with Parma, but with the smaller Duchy of Lucca, which had been created specifically for her family in place of the ancient Republic of Lucca. As a consolation, she was allowed to retain the honours of a queen. Initially stubbornly opposed to accepting this accord, Maria Luisa only took the government of Lucca in December 1817, after her family had been granted the right of reversion to the Duchy of Parma upon the death of the incumbent Duchess, the former Empress of the French, Marie Louise of Austria.

As the reigning duchess of Lucca, she disregarded the constitution imposed by the Congress of Vienna. While spending time in her palace in Rome, she died of cancer at the age of 41.

== Infanta of Spain ==
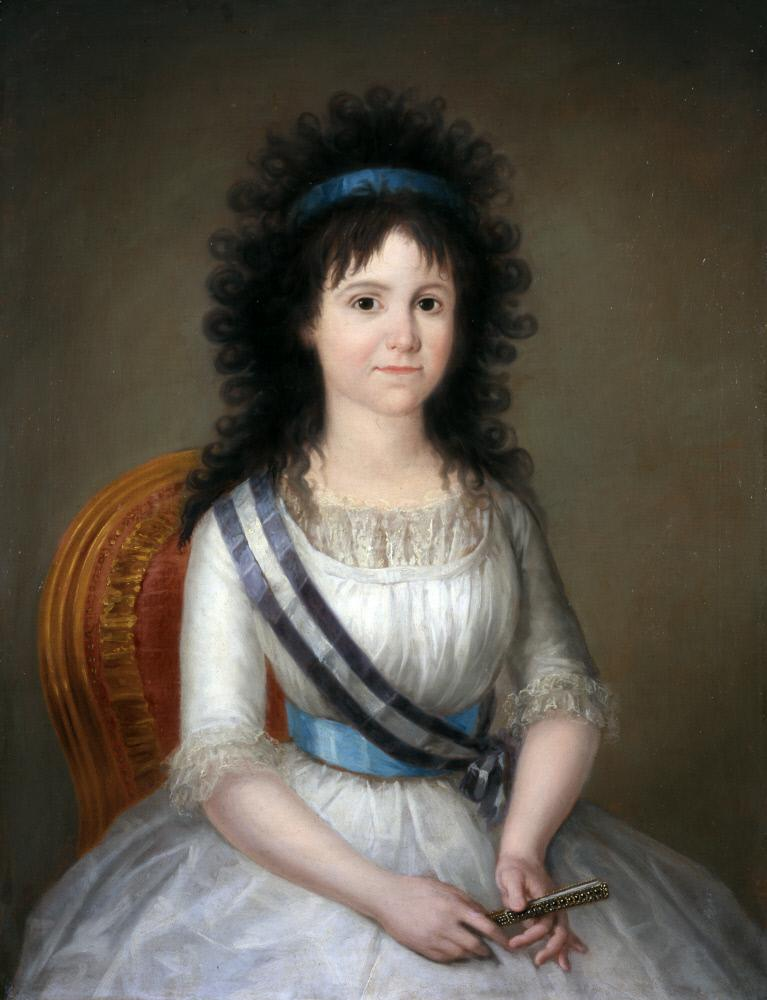
Thirteen-year-old Maria Luisa, portrait by Agustín Esteve, 1795.

Born at the Royal Palace of La Granja de San Ildefonso, Segovia, Spain, Maria Luisa was the third surviving daughter of King Charles IV of Spain and Maria Luisa of Parma, granddaughter of Louis XV and the popular Queen Marie Leszczyńska. She was given the names Maria Luisa Josefina Antonieta, after an older sister, Maria Luisa Carlota, who had died just four days before Maria Luisa's birth on 2 July, and her mother.

In 1795, Maria Luisa's first cousin, Louis of Bourbon-Parma, heir apparent to the Duchy of Parma and Piacenza, came to the Spanish court to finish his education. There was an understanding between the two royal families that Louis would marry one of the daughters of Charles IV. It was anticipated that he would marry the Infanta Maria Amalia, Charles IV's eldest unmarried daughter. She was fifteen years old at the time and of a timid and melancholic nature, but was not very beautiful. Louis, who was equally shy and reserved, preferred her younger sister, Maria Luisa, who although only twelve, was of a more cheerful disposition and somewhat better-looking. All four daughters of Charles IV were short and not particularly beautiful, but Maria Luisa was clever, lively and amusing. She had dark curly hair, brown eyes and a Grecian nose. Her face was expressive and her character lively, and she was generous, kindhearted, devout and more attractive than her sisters. Both infantas were favorably impressed by the Prince of Parma, a tall and handsome young man, and when he ultimately chose the younger sister, Queen Maria Luisa readily agreed to the change of bride.

== Marriage ==
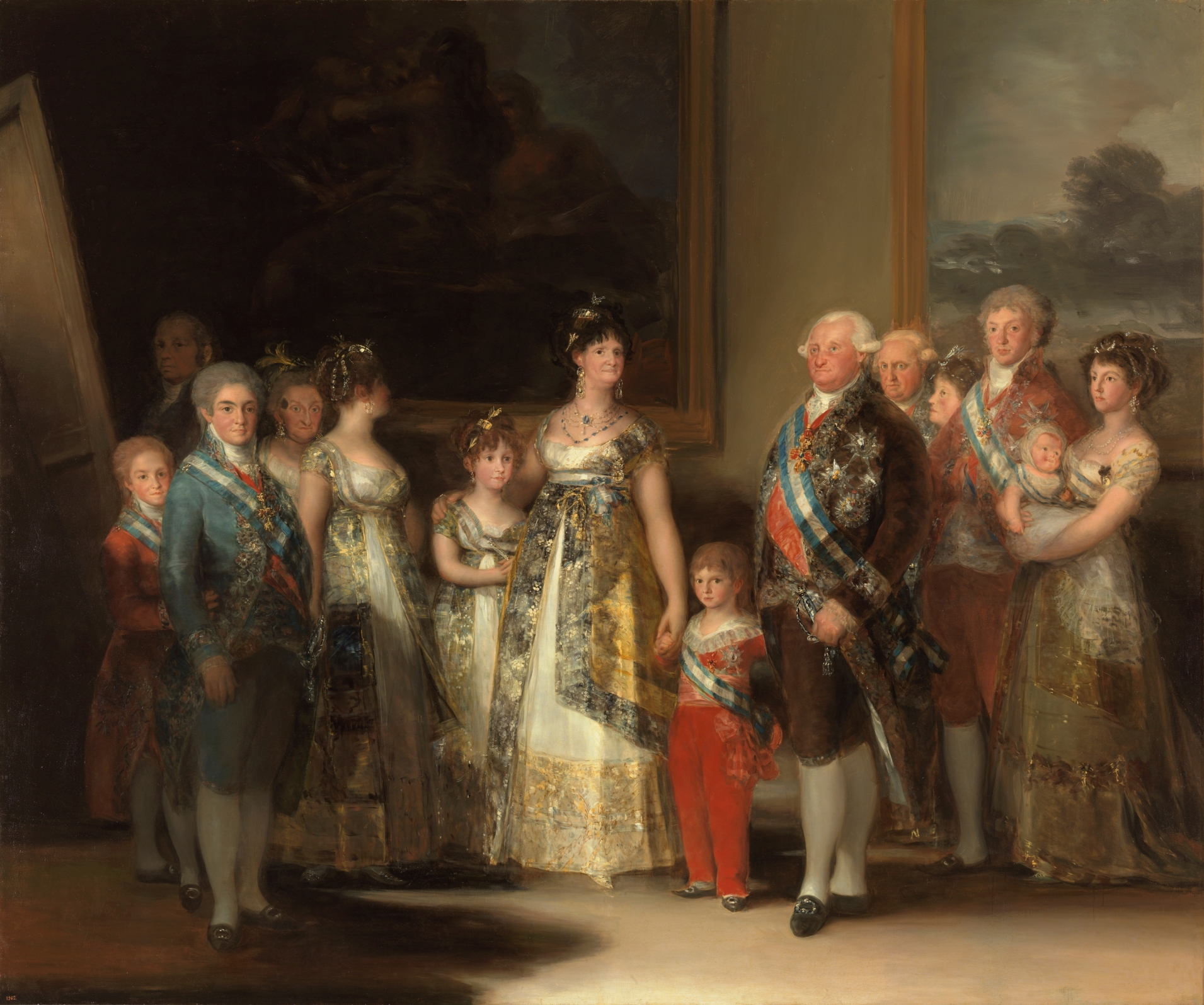
The family of Charles IV by Francisco de Goya. Maria Luisa is beside her husband with her son in her arms on the right hand side of the painting.

Louis was created Infante of Spain and married Maria Luisa on 25 August 1795 at the Royal Palace of La Granja. In a double wedding with her sister, Maria Amalia, who was the original intended bride, married her much older uncle, Infante Antonio. The marriage between the two different personalities turned out to be happy, though it was clouded by Louis' ill health: He was frail, suffering chest problems, and since a childhood accident when he hit his head on a marble table, had epileptic seizures. As the years went on his health deteriorated and he grew to be increasingly dependent on his wife. The young couple remained in Spain during the early years of their marriage, which were to be the happiest period of their lives. In early 1796, the couple traveled through Castile, Extramadura all the way to Portugal.

Maria Luisa was only thirteen when she married, and her first child was not born for another four years. Her first son, Charles Louis, was born in Madrid on 22 December 1799. Afterwards, the couple wanted to go to Parma, the lands they were going to inherit, but the King and Queen were reluctant to allow their departure. They were still in Spain in the spring of 1800 and staying at the Royal Palace of Aranjuez when they were painted with the royal family in Charles IV of Spain and His Family by Goya.

== Queen of Etruria ==
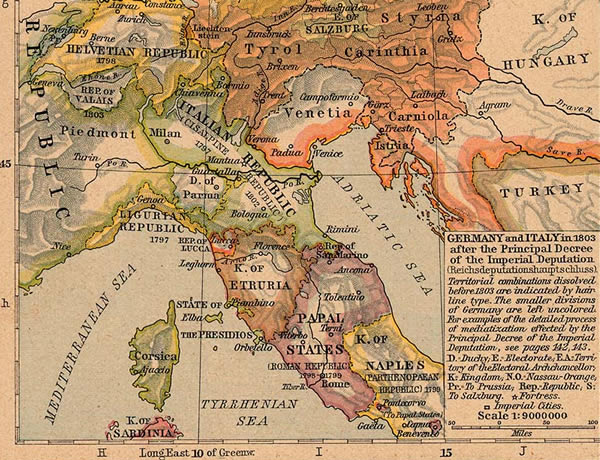
The Kingdom of Etruria in 1803

Maria Luisa's life was deeply marked by Napoleon Bonaparte's actions. Napoleon was interested in having Spain as an ally against the United Kingdom. In the summer of 1800, he sent his brother Lucien to the Spanish court with the proposal that would result in the Treaty of Aranjuez. Napoleon, who had conquered Italy, proposed to compensate the House of Bourbon-Parma for their loss of the Duchy of Parma and Piacenza by creating the new Kingdom of Etruria for Louis, heir of Parma. The new kingdom was created out of the Grand Duchy of Tuscany.

To make way for the Bourbons, Ferdinand III, Grand Duke of Tuscany was ousted and compensated with Salzburg. Maria Luisa, who had never lived away from her own family and was totally inexperienced in political affairs, opposed the plan. One of Napoleon's conditions was that the young couple had to go to Paris and there receive from him the investiture of their new sovereignty, before taking possession of Etruria. Maria Luisa was reluctant to make a trip to France, where only seven years earlier her relatives Louis XVI and Marie Antoinette had been executed. However, pressed also by her family, she did as she was told. On 21 April 1801 the couple and their son left Madrid, crossed the border in Bayonne and traveled incognito to France under the name of Counts of Livorno. Napoleon received them with great attentions, at their arrival in Paris on 24 May. At first, the young couple did not make a good impression. In her memoirs, Laure Junot described Maria Luisa's character as a "mixture of shyness and haughtiness which at first gave restraint to her conversation and manners".

On her part, the Infanta did not enjoy her visit to Paris. Ill most of the time, she had a fever, often had to stay in bed and only reluctantly took part in the diversions on her honor. She was anxious about the health of her husband, who depended on her for everything. One day, as Louis got out of the carriage at Château de Malmaison, where they were going to dine, he suddenly fell to the ground during an epileptic seizure. Laure Junot described the scene in her memoirs:

"The Queen appeared much distressed and tried to conceal her husband; ... he was as pale as a death and his features completely altered ..."

In the recollections of Napoleon's valet, Maria Luisa left a more favorable impression than her husband: "The Queen of Etruria was, in the opinion of the First Consul, more sagacious and prudent than her husband.. [she] dressed herself in the morning for the whole day, and walked in the gardens, her head adorned with flowers or a diadem, and wearing a dress, the train of which swept up the sand of the walk: often also carrying in her arms one of her children.., by night the toilet of her Majesty was somewhat disarranged. She was far from pretty, and her manner were not suited to her rank. But, which fully atoned for all of this, she was good-tempered, much loved by those in her service, and scrupulous in fulfilling the duties of wife and mother. In consequence, the First Consul, who made a great point of domestic virtue, professed for her the highest esteem."

On 30 June, after staying in Paris for three weeks, Maria Luisa and her husband, headed south toward Parma. In Piacenza they were greeted by Louis' parents, together they went to Parma and Maria Luisa met her husband's two unmarried sisters. They found Louis already speaking Italian with a foreign accent while Maria Luisa's Italian was often mixed with Spanish words. After three weeks in Parma they entered Etruria. On 12 August they arrived at Florence. The French general Joachim Murat had been sent to Florence to prepare the Pitti Palace for them. But the King and Queen of Etruria did not have an auspicious start in their new life. Maria Luisa suffered a miscarriage, while her frail husband's health deteriorated further, fits of epilepsy becoming more frequent. The Pitti Palace, the residence of the King and Queen, was the former house of the Medici dukes. The palace had been practically abandoned after the death of the last Medici and the ousted Grand Duke Ferdinand had taken most of its valuables with him. Short of money, Maria Luisa and her husband were forced to furnish the Pitti Palace borrowing furniture from the local nobility.

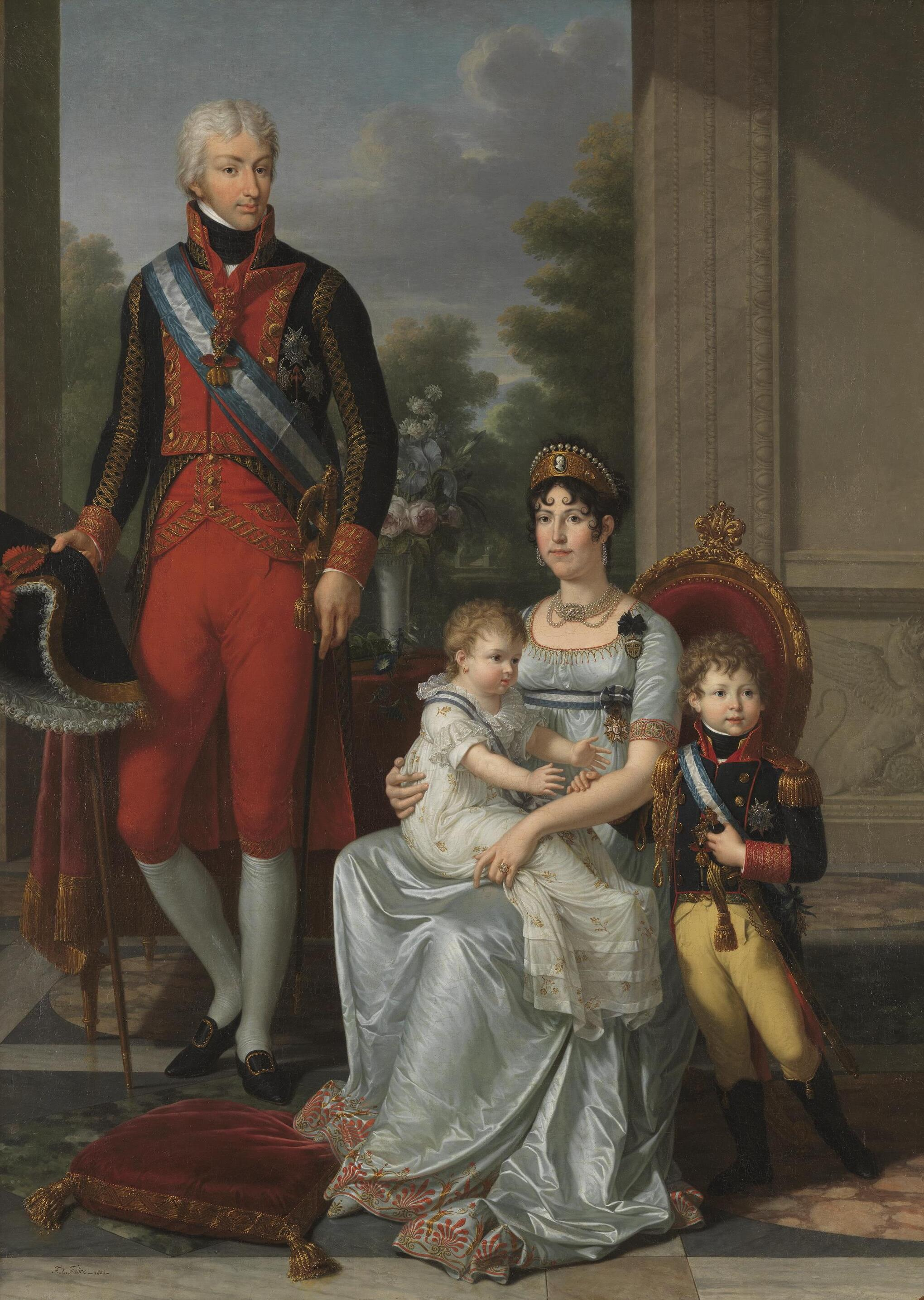
The Family of the King of Etruria

Maria Luisa and Louis were both full of good intentions but they were received with hostility by the population and the nobility that missed the popular Grand Duke and saw them as just mere tools in the hands of the French. Etruria's finances were in deplorable state; the country was ruined by war, bad harvest and the cost to have to maintain the unpopular French troops stationed in Etruria, that only much later were replaced by Spanish troops sent by Charles IV. In 1802, Maria Luisa and her husband were invited to Spain to attend the double wedding of her brother Ferdinand with Maria Antonia of Naples, and of her youngest sister, Maria Isabel, with Francis I of Naples. With Etruria's financial and economic difficulties, Louis' health failing and Maria Luisa in an early state of pregnancy, going abroad was clearly not expedient, but under the pressure of her father and wanted to see her family, they started the journey to her native country.

Louis felt very ill before boarding the ship, waiting for his full recovery delayed their plans for a month. Once at sea, they were caught in a storm for three days. On the second day aboard, 2 October 1802, still in open waters before arriving at Barcelona, Maria Luisa under difficulties gave birth to her daughter Maria Luisa Carlota (named after Maria Luisa's older deceased sister). At first, doctors thought that both mother and daughter would not survive. The couple also found out that they arrived too late for the wedding. Maria Luisa, still very ill, waited three days on the ship to recover before she went ashore in Barcelona, where her parents were waiting for her. One week after they arrival they got news that Louis's father, Ferdinand, had died. Ill and unhappy, Louis wanted to return as soon as possible to his Italian states, but Charles IV and Maria Luisa insisted to take them to the court in Madrid. It was not until 29 December when they were allowed to start the trip leaving Spain by sea in Cartagena.

Back in Etruria, the illness of her husband was carefully concealed from the population, as Maria Luisa alone was seen in public functions and entertaining at court. For this she was accused of overpowering her husband and being merry in his absence. Louis died on 27 May 1803, aged 30, as a consequence of an epileptic crisis.

== Regent of Etruria ==
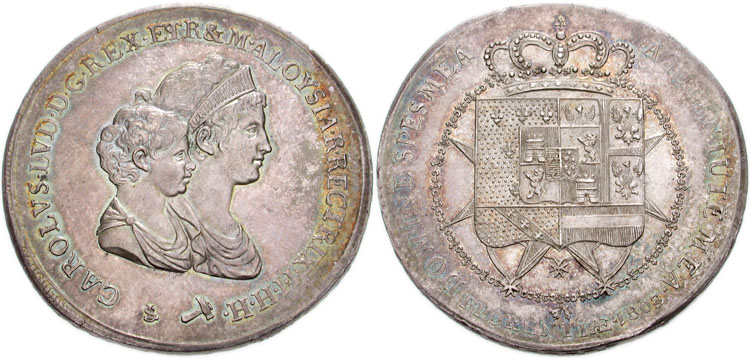
Coins of King Charles Louis and Queen Maria Luisa: 10 lires (1803).

Grief-stricken by the death of her husband, she developed a nervous illness. She had to act as a regent for her son Charles Louis, the new King of Etruria. Only twenty years old when she was widowed, plans for a new wedding were considered: France and Spain wanted to marry her to her first cousin, Infante Pedro Carlos of Spain and Portugal, but the marriage never materialized.

During her four-year regency, Maria Luisa took on the government of Etruria with the help of her ministers Count Fossombroni and Jean Garbiel Eynard (1775-1863). With them, Maria Luisa reorganized the tax system, created taxable manufactures like tobacco and porcelain companies and increased the size of the army. The Queen regent spent lavishly on educational projects, founding a Higher School of Science, and patronising the Reale Museo di Fisica e Storia Naturale. To ingratiate herself with the Florentine people, she entertained lavishly at Pitti Palace, holding receptions for artists and writers, as well as government officials.

Though Maria Luisa by then had become fond of Florence, Napoleon had other plans for Italy and Spain: I am afraid the Queen is too young and her minister too old to govern the Kingdom of Etruria, he said. She was accused of not enforcing the English blockade in Etruria. Increasing Maria Luisa's isolation, Napoleon replaced the French ambassador to Etruria, the Marchaise de Beauharnais, with the less congenial, Count Hector d'Aubusson de la Feuillade, the Empress Joséphine's chamberlain. On 23 November 1807, while Maria Luisa was staying at Villa di Castello, her country residence, the French minister came to inform her that Spain had ceded Etruria to France and ordered her to leave Florence on the spot. Her father answered her pleas with discouragement: she yielded and hastily left the kingdom, returning to her family in Spain, leaving Florence on 10 December 1807 with her children, their future uncertain. Napoleon annexed the territory to France and granted the title of "Grand Duchess of Tuscany" to his sister Elisa.

== Exile ==
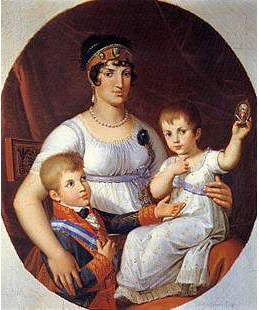
Maria Luisa and her two children

The exiled Queen went to Milan where she had an interview with Napoleon. He promised her, as compensation for the loss of Etruria, the throne of a Kingdom of Northern Lusitania (in the North of Portugal), he intended to create after the Franco-Spanish conquest of Portugal. This was part of the Treaty of Fontainebleau between France and Spain (October 1807) that also had incorporated Etruria to Napoleons' domains. Napoleon had already ordered the invasion of Portugal but his secret aim was ultimately to depose the Spanish royal family and have access to the money remitted from Spanish colonies in the New World. As part of the agreement, Maria Luisa would marry Lucien Bonaparte, who would have to divorce his wife, but both refused: Lucien was attached to his wife and Maria Luisa considered those nuptials a misalliance, and she would not allow herself to be put in Portugal in the place of her eldest sister, Carlota. Napoleon wanted Maria Luisa to settle in Nice or Turin, but her intentions were to join her parents in Spain. Crossing the south of France, on 3 February she entered Spain by Barcelona and on the 19th, she joined her family at Aranjuez. She arrived at a court deeply divided and a country in unrest: her brother, Ferdinand, Prince of Asturias, had plotted against their father and the unpopular prime minister Manuel Godoy.

Ferdinand had been pardoned but with the family's prestige shaken, Napoleon took this opportunity to invade Spain. With the excuse of sending reinforcements to Lisbon, French troops had entered Spain in December. Not completely blind to Napoleon's real intentions, the Spanish royal family had secretly planned their escape to New Spain, but their plans were cut short. At this point Maria Luisa arrived in Aranjuez on 19 February 1808.

Supporters of Ferdinand spread the story that prime minister Godoy had betrayed Spain to Napoleon. On 18 March a popular uprising known as the Mutiny of Aranjuez took place. Members of popular classes, soldiers and peasants assaulted Godoy's residence, captured him, and made King Charles depose the prime minister. Two days later, the court forced Charles IV to abdicate and yield the throne to his son, now Ferdinand VII. The abdication of Charles IV in favor of Ferdinand VII was enthusiastically acclaimed by the people.

Maria Luisa, who at the time had been in Spain for barely a month, took her father's side against the party of her brother. She acted as intermediate between the deposed Charles IV and the French general Murat, who on 23 March entered Madrid. Napoleon, capitalizing on the rivalry between father and son, invited both to Bayonne, France, ostensibly to act as a mediator. Both kings, afraid of the French power, thought it appropriate to accept the invitation and separately left for France. Maria Luisa was just recovering from measles at the time of the Mutiny of Aranjuez, and was not fit to travel. Her son was also sick and she stayed behind with her children, her uncle Antonio and her younger brother Francisco de Paula. However, Napoleon insisted on all relatives of the King to leave Spain and called them to France. At their departure on 2 May 1808, citizens of Madrid rose up in rebellion against the French occupation, but the revolt was crushed by Murat.

At that time, Maria Luisa had become unpopular. The intervention in Etruria had been very costly to Spain and Maria Luisa's secret dealing with Murat had been seen as going against the interest of her native country. She was considered in Spain as a foreign princess aiming at gaining a throne for her son. Arriving at Bayonne, Maria Luisa was greeted by her father with the words "My daughter, our family has forever ceased to reign". Napoleon had forced both Charles IV and Ferdinand VII to renounce the throne of Spain and in exchange for their renunciation of all claims, were promised a large pension and residence in Compiègne and Château de Chambord. Maria Luisa, who in vain tried to convince Napoleon to restore her to Tuscany or Parma, was offered a large income. He assured her that she would be much happier without the troubles of government, but Maria Luisa openly protested against the confiscation of her son's dominions.

== Imprisonment ==
Maria Luisa of Spain, Queen of Etruria

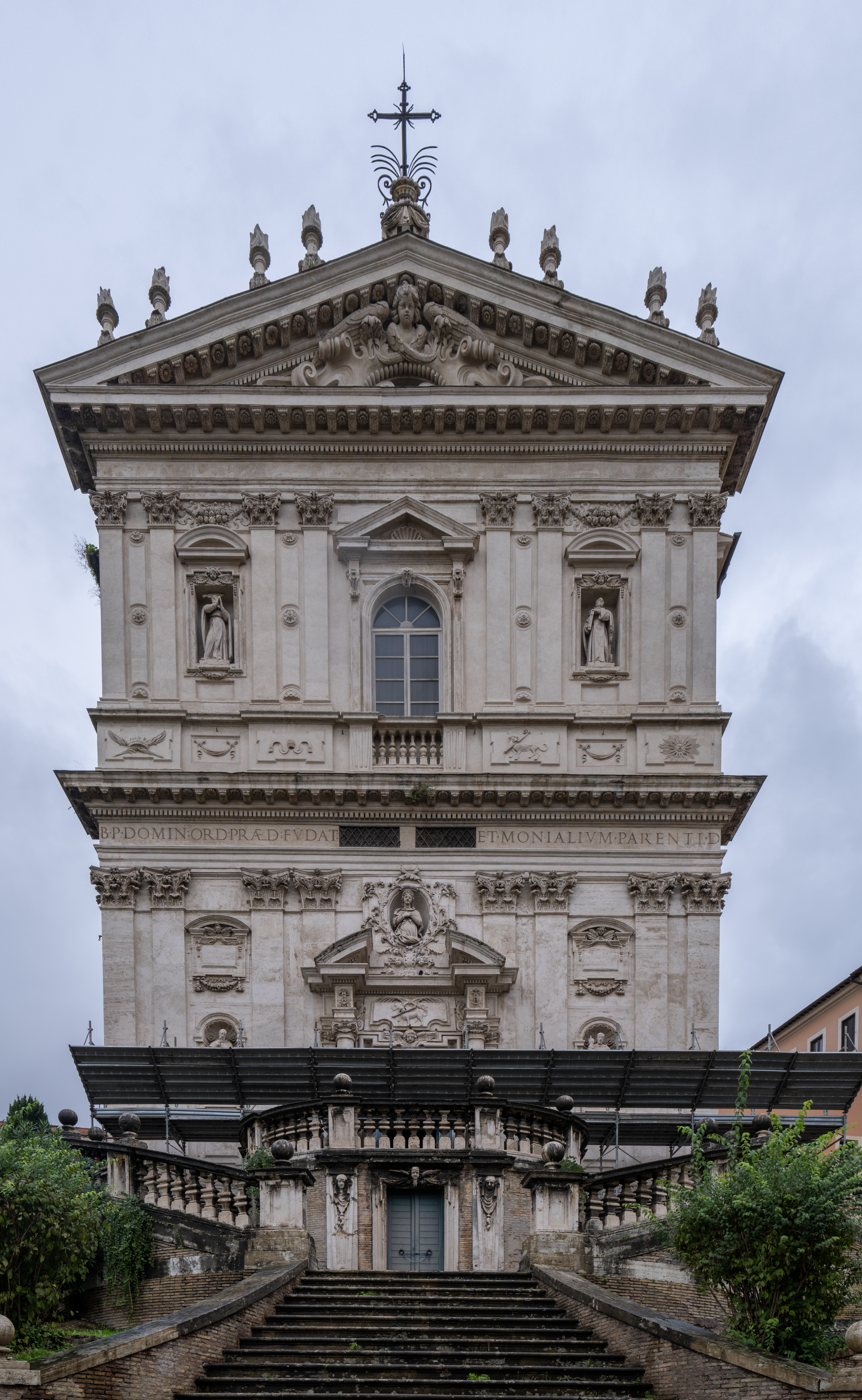
Convent of Santi Domenico e Sisto where Maria Luisa was imprisoned.

After this, Napoleon gave Spain to his brother Joseph Bonaparte and forced the royal family into exile in Fontainebleau. Maria Luisa requested a separate residence and moved with her children to a house in Passy, but was soon moved to Compiègne on 18 June. She was plagued by frequent sickness and shortage of money and, not owning any horses, was forced to walk wherever she needed to go. When at last Napoleon sent 12,000 francs as the promised compensation, the expenses of her trip to France were discounted. She wrote a letter of protest, saying that prisoners were never made to pay for their removal, but she was advised not to send it out. She was promised to retire to the Palace of Colorno in Parma with a substantial allowance, but once in Lyon, under the pretext of conducting her to her destination, she was escorted to Nice, where she was kept under strict vigilance.

She planned to escape to England, but her letters were intercepted and her two accomplices executed. Maria Luisa was arrested on 26 July and condemned to be imprisoned in a convent in Rome, while her nine-year-old son was to remain in the care of his grandfather Charles IV. Maria Luisa's pension was reduced to 2500 francs; all her jewels and valuables were taken away. She was imprisoned in the convent of Santi Domenico e Sisto, near the Quirinal Hill on 14 August 1811 with her daughter and a maid. Her pleas for clemency were unanswered.

On 18 March 1812, Maria Luisa and her children were stripped of their rights to the Spanish crown by the Cortes of Cádiz – which served as a parliamentary Regency after Ferdinand VII was deposed – because she was under Napoleon's control. Her rights were not restored until 1820. The former Queen of Etruria wrote in her Memoirs:

I was for two years and a half in that monastery and one year without seeing or talking to anybody. I was not allowed to write or receive news not even from my own son. I had been in the convent for eleven months already when my parents came with my son to Rome on 16 June 1812. I was hoping to be released immediately after their arrival, but I was wrong, instead of diminishing the rigor of my imprisonment I was put under stricter orders.

On 19 June 1812, she was allowed to see her family. In an emotional meeting, Maria Luisa threw herself into her mother's arms, kissed her son with frenzy and her father hugged them all in a general embrace. After this, Maria Luisa was allowed to see her parents and her son once a month but only for twenty minutes and under surveillance. Only the fall of Napoleon opened the gates of her prison. On 14 January 1814, after more than four years of captivity, she was freed when the troops of Joachim Murat entered Rome.

== Congress of Vienna ==
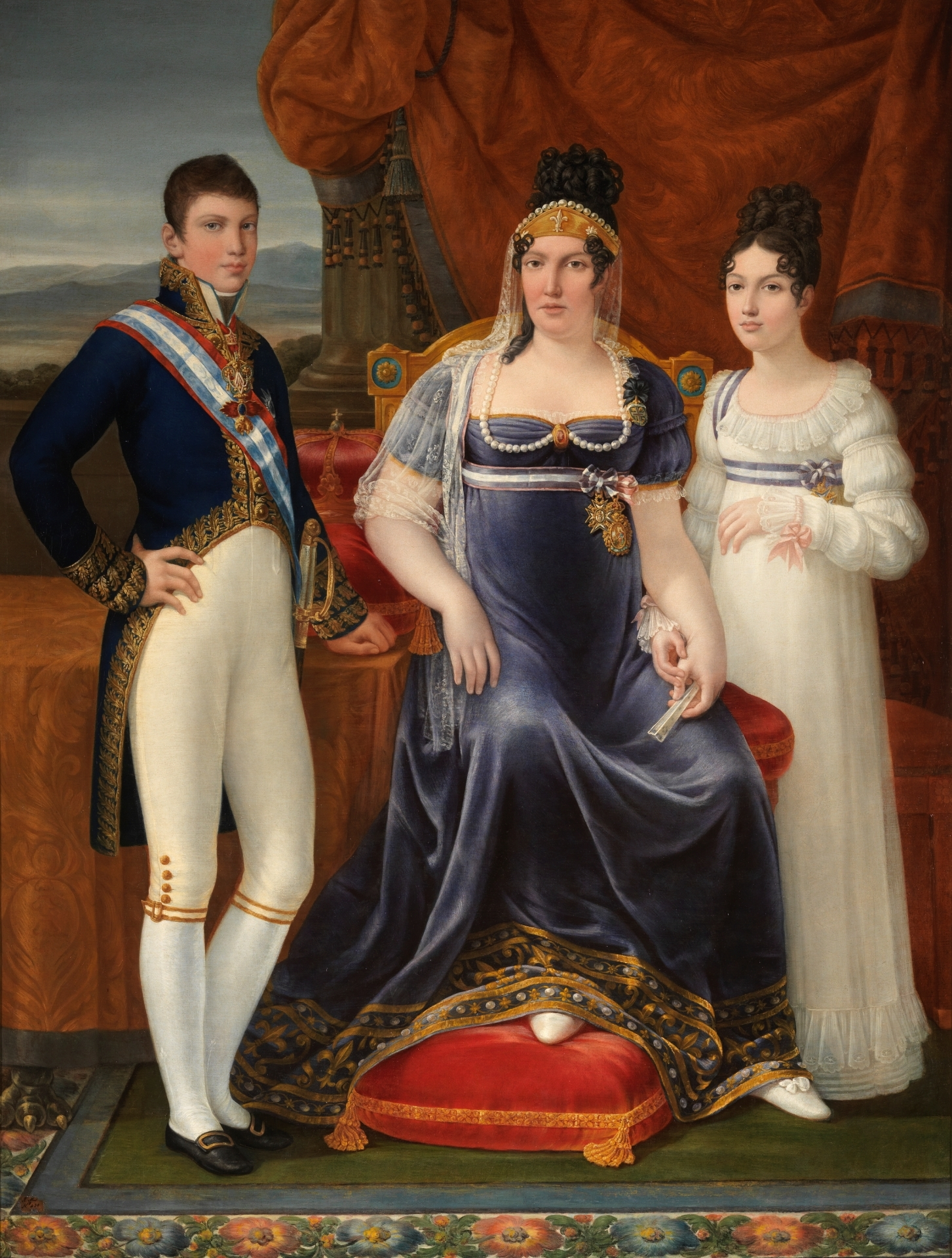
Maria Luisa, Queen of Etruria with her two children Charles Louis and Luisa Carlota. Portrait by José Aparicio e Inglada, 1815.

Maria Luisa moved with her children and her parents to the Barberini Palace. She hoped for the restorations of her son's estates and as the Congress of Vienna (1814–15) assembled to reorder the European map, she quickly wrote and published the Memoirs of the Queen of Etruria, originally written in Italian but translated to different languages, to put forward her case. When Napoleon returned from his exile at Elba, Maria Luisa and her parents fled Rome, moving from one city to another in Italy. The Countess de Boigne met her in Genoa and found her untidy and vulgar. When Napoleon was defeated at Waterloo, they returned to Rome.

At the Congress of Vienna, Maria Luisa's interests were represented by the Spanish emissary Marquis of Labrador, an incompetent man, who did not successfully advance his country's or Maria Luisa's diplomatic goals. The Austrian Chancellor Metternich had decided not to restore Parma to the House of Bourbon, but to give it to Napoleon's wife, Marie Louise of Austria. Maria Luisa pleaded her cause to her brother Ferdinand VII of Spain, Pope Pius VII, and Tsar Alexander I of Russia. Ultimately, the Congress decided to compensate Maria Luisa and her son with the smaller Duchy of Lucca, which was established in place of the ancient Republic of Lucca not restored by the Congress. She was to retain the honors of a queen as she had before in Etruria. Her brother Ferdinand VII of Spain refused to sign both the Final act of the Congress and the subsequent Treaty of Paris of 1815.

Maria Luisa stubbornly rejected this compromise for more than two years. During this time, she lived with her children in a Roman palace. Family relationships became strained: her parents and her brother Ferdinand VII wanted to marry Maria Luisa's daughter, Maria Luisa Carlota, then fourteen years old, to Francisco de Paula, Maria Luisa's youngest brother. She opposed this plan, considering her brother (eight years older than her young daughter) to be too reckless. She also rejected a proposed plan for her own son to marry Maria Christina of the Two Sicilies, a daughter of her sister Maria Isabel.

Seeking independence from her family, Maria Luisa accepted the solution offered by the treaty of Paris in 1817: upon the death of Marie Louise of Austria, the Duchy of Parma would revert "to H.M. the Infanta of Spain Maria Luisa, to the Infante D. Charles Louis her son and his direct male descendants", while the Duchy of Lucca would simultaneously revert to the Grand Duchy of Tuscany with some territorial adjustments in favor of the Duchy of Modena and Reggio. Maria Luisa became Duchess of Lucca in her own right (suo jure) and was granted the rank and privileges of a queen. Her son, Charles Louis, would succeed her only upon her death and would meantime be styled the Prince of Lucca. Then the Spanish minister in Turin, took possession of Lucca until Maria Luisa arrived on 7 December 1817.

== Duchess of Lucca ==
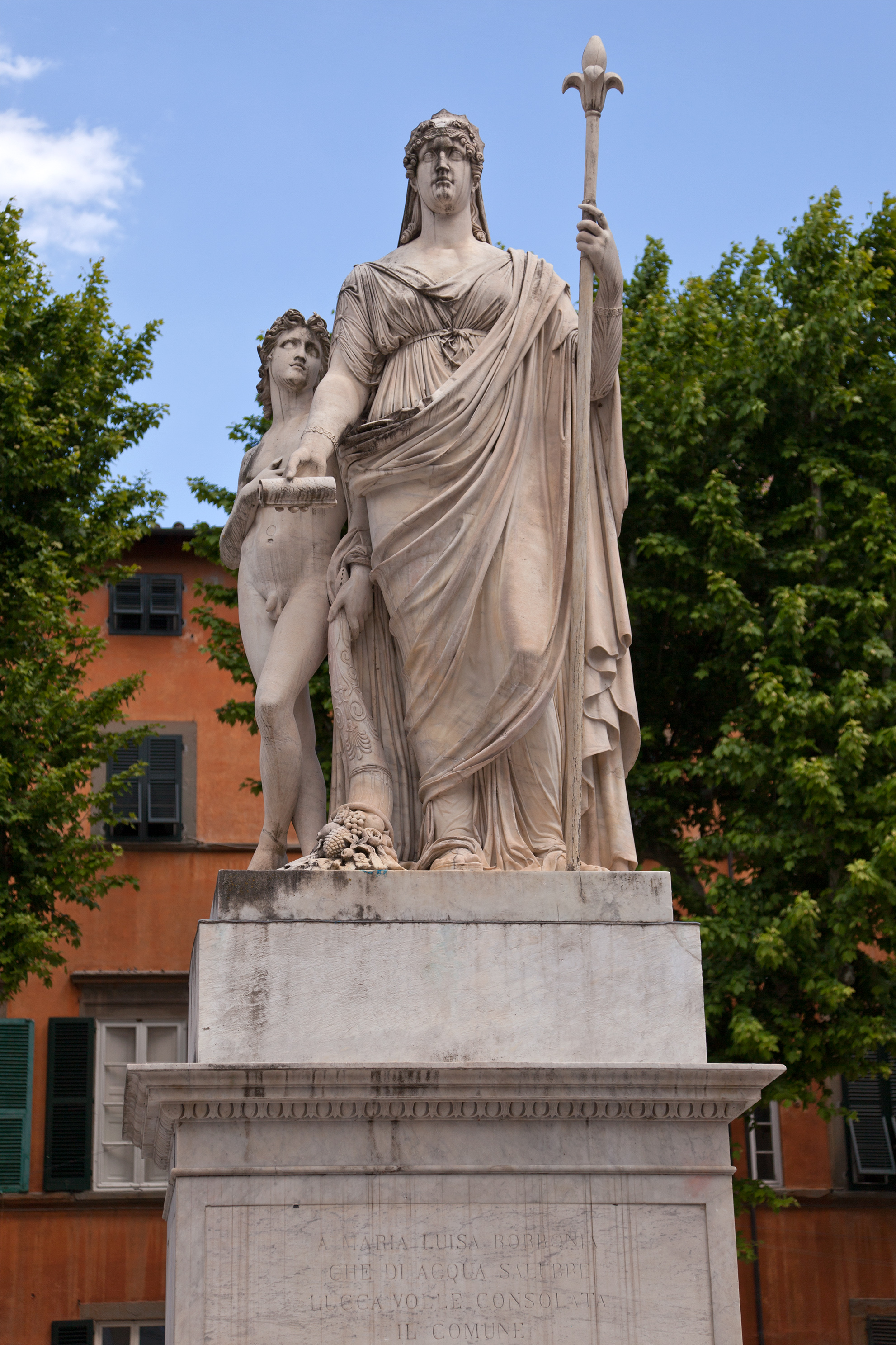
Statue of Maria Luisa at Piazza Napoleone in Lucca by Lorenzo Bartolini.

When Maria Luisa arrived in Lucca, she was already thirty-five years old. Ten years of endless struggles had taken their toll: she was prematurely aged and had gained a lot of weight. Nevertheless, she set her sights on a new marriage. She first addressed Ferdinand III, Grand Duke of Tuscany, who was a widower, and also her first cousin, possibly with the idea of securing her position in Lucca and gaining a foothold in Florence. After this failed, she tried Archduke Ferdinand of Austria-Este but this failed as well. After the assassination of Charles Ferdinand, Duke of Berry, in 1820, there were plans to marry her to his father, the future King Charles X of France.

Maria Luisa's firm intention was to obliterate every trace of the government of Elisa Bonaparte, who had ruled Lucca from 1805 to 1814 and who nominally succeeded Maria Luisa in Tuscany in 1808. To this end, she completely contravened the provision contained in Article 101 of the Final Act of the Congress of Vienna, that the Duchy should retain "a form of government founded upon the principles of that which [the Principality of Lucca had] received in 1805".

As duchess, she promoted public works and culture in the spirit of enlightenment and during her government the sciences flourished. Between 1817 and 1820, she ordered the complete renewal of the inner decorations of the Palazzo Ducale, completely redecorating the building into its present form, making the Palazzo one of the finest in Italy. Maria Luisa, a religious woman, favored the clergy. In her small state, seventeen new convents were founded in the six years of her reign. Among the projects she accomplished were the building of a new aqueduct and the development of Viareggio, the port of the duchy.

Politically, Maria Luisa governed Lucca in an absolutist fashion, though her government was not very reactionary and oppressive. When the Spanish liberals imposed a constitution on her brother, King Ferdinand VII, she opened up to the idea of accepting a constitution, but the resurgence of Spanish absolutism in 1823 ended her intentions. In 1820, she arranged the wedding of her twenty-year-old son with Princess Maria Teresa of Savoy, one of the twin daughters of King Victor Emmanuel I of Sardinia. The relationship with her son had turned sour and later he complained that his mother had "ruined him physically, morally and financially".

== Death ==
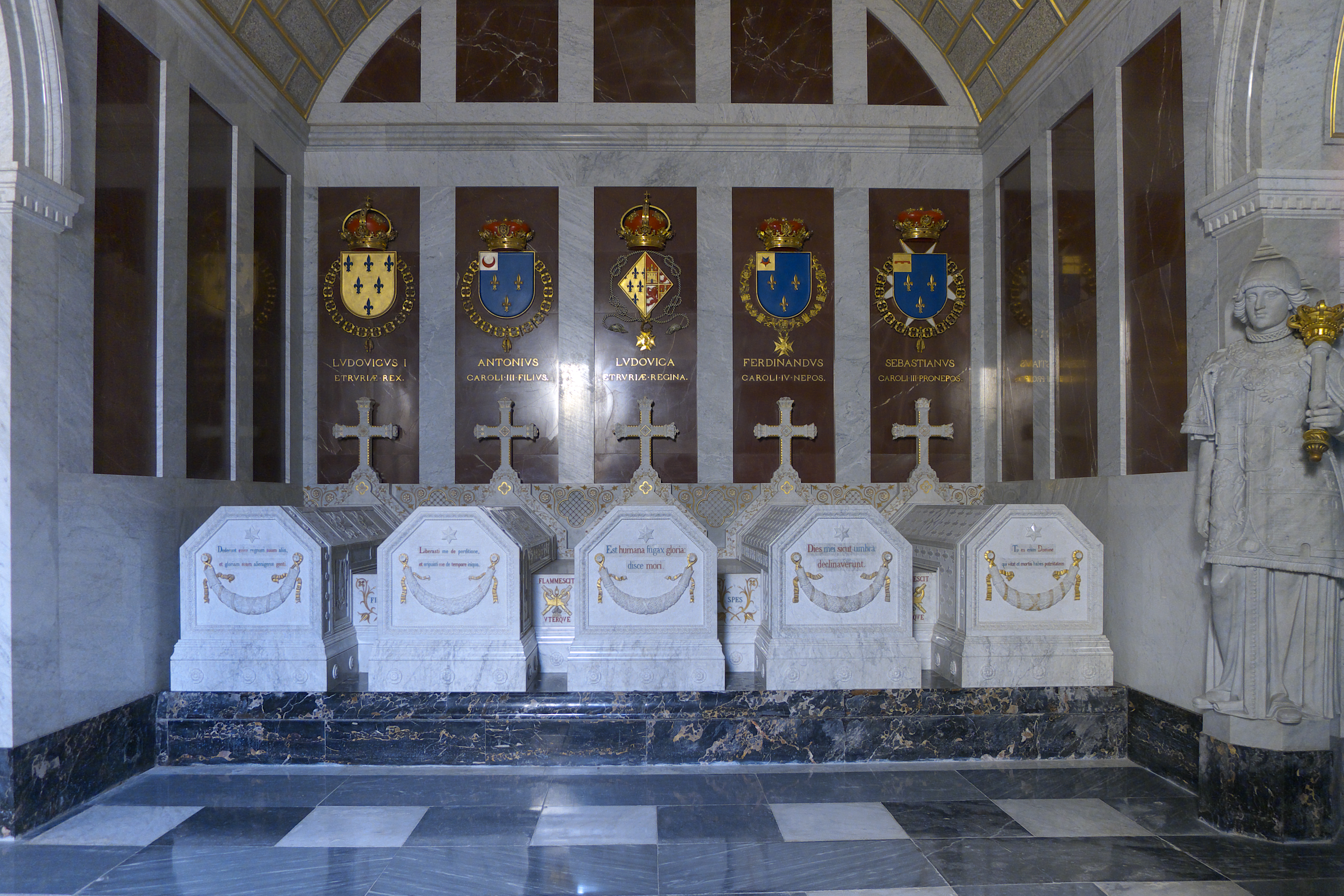
Tomb of "Ludovica, Queen of Etruria" (centre) in the Panteón de Infantes, Monasterio de El Escorial, Madrid

Throughout these years, she spent the summers in Lucca and the winters in Rome. She went to Rome on 25 October 1823 to her Palace in Piazza Venezia, already feeling ill. On 22 February 1824, she signed her will and died of cancer on 13 March in Rome.

Her body was taken to Spain to be buried at El Escorial. By resolution of the Municipality of Lucca in 1823, a monument depicting Maria Luisa, the work of the sculptor Lorenzo Bartolini, was later erected in the main square in front of the Ducal Palace. This monument still stands today in the square named after Napoleon.

In accordance with the stipulations of the aforementioned 1817 Treaty of Paris, upon her death, she was succeeded by her son Charles Louis.

== Children ==
Maria Luisa was survived by her two children:

- Charles Louis Ferdinand (22 December 1799 – 16 April 1883) married Maria Teresa of Savoy Princess of Savoy, daughter of King Victor Emmanuel I of Sardinia and Maria Theresa of Austria-Este.
- Luisa Carlota (Barcelona, 2 October 1802 – Rome, 18 March 1857) married Prince Maximilian of Saxony, widower of her aunt Carolina of Parma, as his second wife. Although the marriage was childless, she was the stepmother of Maximilian and Caroline's children, including the future kings Frederick Augustus II and John I of Saxony, and Maria Josepha Amalia of Saxony, Queen of Spain.

== Ancestors ==
Ancestors of Maria Luisa, Duchess of Lucca

16. Louis, Dauphin of France
8. Philip V of Spain
17. Maria Anna Victoria of Bavaria
4. Charles III of Spain
18. Odoardo Farnese, Hereditary Prince of Parma
9. Elisabeth Farnese
19. Dorothea Sophie of the Palatinate
2. Charles IV of Spain
20. Augustus II of Poland
10. Augustus III of Poland
21. Christiane Eberhardine of Bayreuth
5. Maria Amalia of Saxony
22. Joseph I, Holy Roman Emperor
11. Maria Josepha of Austria
23. Wilhelmine Amalia of Brunswick
1. Maria Luisa, Duchess of Lucca
24. Louis, Dauphin of France (= 16)
12. Philip V of Spain (= 8)
25. Maria Anna Victoria of Bavaria (= 17)
6. Philip, Duke of Parma
26. Odoardo Farnese, Hereditary Prince of Parma (= 18)
13. Elisabeth Farnese (= 9)
27. Dorothea Sophie of the Palatinate (= 19)
3. Maria Luisa of Parma
28. Louis, Duke of Burgundy
14. Louis XV of France
29. Marie Adélaïde of Savoy
7. Louise-Élisabeth of France
30. Stanisław I Leszczyński
15. Marie Leszczyńska
31. Katarzyna Opalińska

== Notes ==
Maria Luisa, Duchess of Lucca House of Bourbon Cadet branch of the Capetian dynasty Born: 6 July 1782 Died: 13 March 1824
Regnal titles
Preceded by Elisa Bonaparte as princess	Duchess of Lucca; 1815–1824	Succeeded by Charles Louis
