= Ottaviano Vimercati =

Italian nobleman and politician (1815–1879)

Count Ottaviano Vimercati
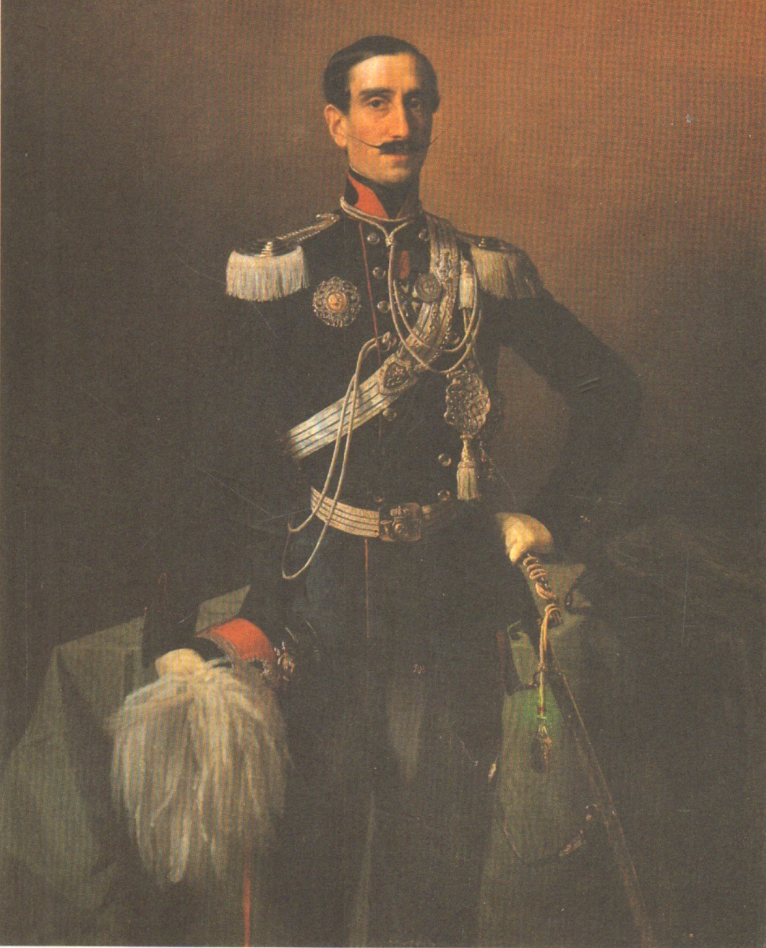

Senator

Count
- Monarch: Victor Emmanuel II

Personal details
- Born: 26 March 1815 Milan
- Died: 25 July 1879 (aged 64) Mirabello
- Occupation: Noble, soldier

Military service
- Allegiance: Second French Empire; Kingdom of Sardinia; Kingdom of Italy
- Branch/service: French Foreign Legion; Royal Sardinian Army; Royal Italian Army
- Years of service: 1841–1857
- Rank: Second Lieutenant; Captain; Aide-de-camp to the King; Lieutenant Colonel; Military Attaché at the Italian Embassy in Paris
- Unit: Bersaglieri; Regiment "Lancieri di Aosta" (6th)
- Battles/wars: French conquest of Algeria; First Italian War of Independence; Crimean War; Second Italian War of Independence; Piedmontese campaign in Central Italy

Count Ottaviano Vimercati (Milan, 26 March 1815 – Mirabello, Monza Park, 25 July 1879) was an Italian nobleman, soldier, diplomat, and senator, known for his contributions during the Risorgimento and for mediating between the Kingdom of Sardinia and Napoleonic France. He served as an officer in the French Foreign Legion (participating in Algerian campaigns), the Piedmontese Army (distinguished in the Crimean War), and later the Royal Italian Army, before being appointed senator in the 13th legislature of the Kingdom of Italy. Throughout his career, he acted as an informateur for Camillo Benso di Cavour in Paris, fostering crucial relations with Napoleon III, and earned the sobriquet “First Lombard” from Victor Emmanuel II after the Battle of Novara.

== Early life ==
Ottaviano Vimercati was born in Milan on 26 March 1815, the eldest son of Count Giovanni Pietro Vimercati and Maria of the Counts Martini, belonging to an ancient Crema aristocratic family documented since the 11th century.

Vimercati’s youth was neither peaceful nor promising: in an era when the Lombard-Venetian patriciate was discouraged from political engagement and often led to squander its energies on pleasures, he followed a path similar to that of many of his peers. However, this period remained a moral burden for him, which he strove to overcome through tireless commitment and irreproachable conduct in his subsequent life.

== Military career ==
In 1841, Vimercati voluntarily enlisted in the French Foreign Legion, serving in the Spahis Regiment and participating in the expeditions to Ṣeidā and Mascara in Algeria. For acts of valor in combat, he was awarded the Cross of Chevalier of the Legion of Honour. Returning to Italy in 1848, he joined the Bersaglieri of the Kingdom of Sardinia as a second lieutenant; in 1849, he was promoted to captain in the Aosta Cavalry Regiment and appointed aide-de-camp to Victor Emmanuel II. In March 1849, after the defeat at Novara (23–24 March), he took part in negotiations for the Armistice of Vignale; on that occasion, Victor Emmanuel II conferred upon him the nickname “First Lombard.”

In 1855, serving with the rank of major, he fought in the Crimean War attached to the Second Division under Alessandro La Marmora, receiving the Silver Medal of Military Valor and the Crimean Commemorative Medal. At the end of the conflict, he retired from active service in 1857.

=== Armistice of Vignale and relations with the sovereign ===
After the Battle of Novara, Vimercati, in his capacity as aide-de-camp to the Duke of Savoy, accompanied Victor Emmanuel II to the Austrian headquarters at Vignale to negotiate the cessation of hostilities. He was present at the signing of the Armistice of Vignale (24 March 1849), acting as intermediary between the king and Marshal Radetzky and promoting an attitude of moderation that helped to consolidate Victor Emmanuel II’s popularity as the “Gentleman King.”

=== Crimean War ===
In February 1855, Vimercati was attached to the Second Italian Division under La Marmora and sent to Crimea. He fought in the operations around Sevastopol and at the Battle of the Alma, distinguishing himself for courage in both infantry and cavalry actions. He received the Crimean Commemorative Medal and a Silver Medal of Military Valor for the operations of 18 June 1855. At the conclusion of hostilities, he returned to Piedmont in 1856, leaving the service permanently the following year.

=== Mission with Garibaldi and liberation of Milan and Naples ===
During the Second Italian War of Independence (1859), Vimercati served as a staff officer under Marshal François Certain de Canrobert of the French army. Upon the liberation of Milan (September 1859), he was among the first Italian officers to enter the city under the Franco-Piedmontese flag, helping to organize the provisional city government and ensuring an Italian administrative presence from day one.

In 1860, sent directly by Cavour, he joined Garibaldi in the Marche to coordinate the arrival of Sardinian reinforcements ahead of the Battle of the Volturno. At the end of the southern campaign (September–October 1860), he entered Naples with Garibaldi’s forces, overseeing the demobilization of the Bourbon troops and facilitating the establishment of the Savoyard provisional government.

== Diplomatic activity ==
After retiring from active service, Vimercati settled in Paris, where he cultivated close ties with Napoleon III. As an “informateur” for Cavour, he provided the Piedmontese government with valuable reports on the French political climate and facilitated negotiations between Victor Emmanuel II and the Emperor. Thanks to his efforts, he contributed to the international recognition of the newly founded Kingdom of Italy immediately after the Expedition of the Thousand, securing formal support from Napoleon III for the Italian cause.

Between 1861 and 1863, he served as a military attaché at the Embassy of the Kingdom of Italy in Paris, negotiating the official recognition of the new Crown and promoting the withdrawal of French garrisons from Rome (1864). In 1869–1870, he attempted to promote a triple alliance among France, Italy, and Austria-Hungary, relying on Napoleonic goodwill—yet the fall of the Empire in 1870 put an end to these negotiations.

== Private life and death ==
In 1850, Vimercati married Carolina Cusani Confalonieri, widow of Marquis Paolo d’Adda Salvaterra, from whom he adopted her son Luigi and niece Emilietta. Carolina died in 1870; on 5 June 1873, Ottaviano remarried Lucia Fougeroux de Soyres, by whom he had a daughter, Anna (1874).

In 1873, Victor Emmanuel II entrusted him with the general inspection of the royal hunting estates; during the same period, Napoleon III awarded him a commemorative medal for his services to French diplomacy.

On 8 May 1879, he was appointed senator of the Kingdom of Italy, formally receiving his investiture on 29 May 1879. Just over a month later, on 25 July 1879, he died in Mirabello, Monza Park, struck down by acute typhus at the age of 64.

== Orders, decorations and medals ==
=== Italian ===
- Knight of the Order of Saints Maurice and Lazarus
- Commander of the Order of Saints Maurice and Lazarus
- Knight of the Military Order of Savoy
- Piedmontese Medal of the Crimean War
- Commemorative Medal of the Campaigns of the Wars of Independence (with 5 clasps)
- Silver Medal of Military Valor

=== Foreign ===
- Knight of the Legion of Honour (France)
- Knight 2nd Class of the Order of Nichan Iftikar (Ottoman Empire)

== See also ==
- Casa Savoia
- Camillo Benso conte di Cavour
- Giuseppe Garibaldi
- Risorgimento
- Torlino Vimercati
- Vimercati
