= House of Benzoni =

Family of Lombardy, Italy

Benzoni
- Noble house
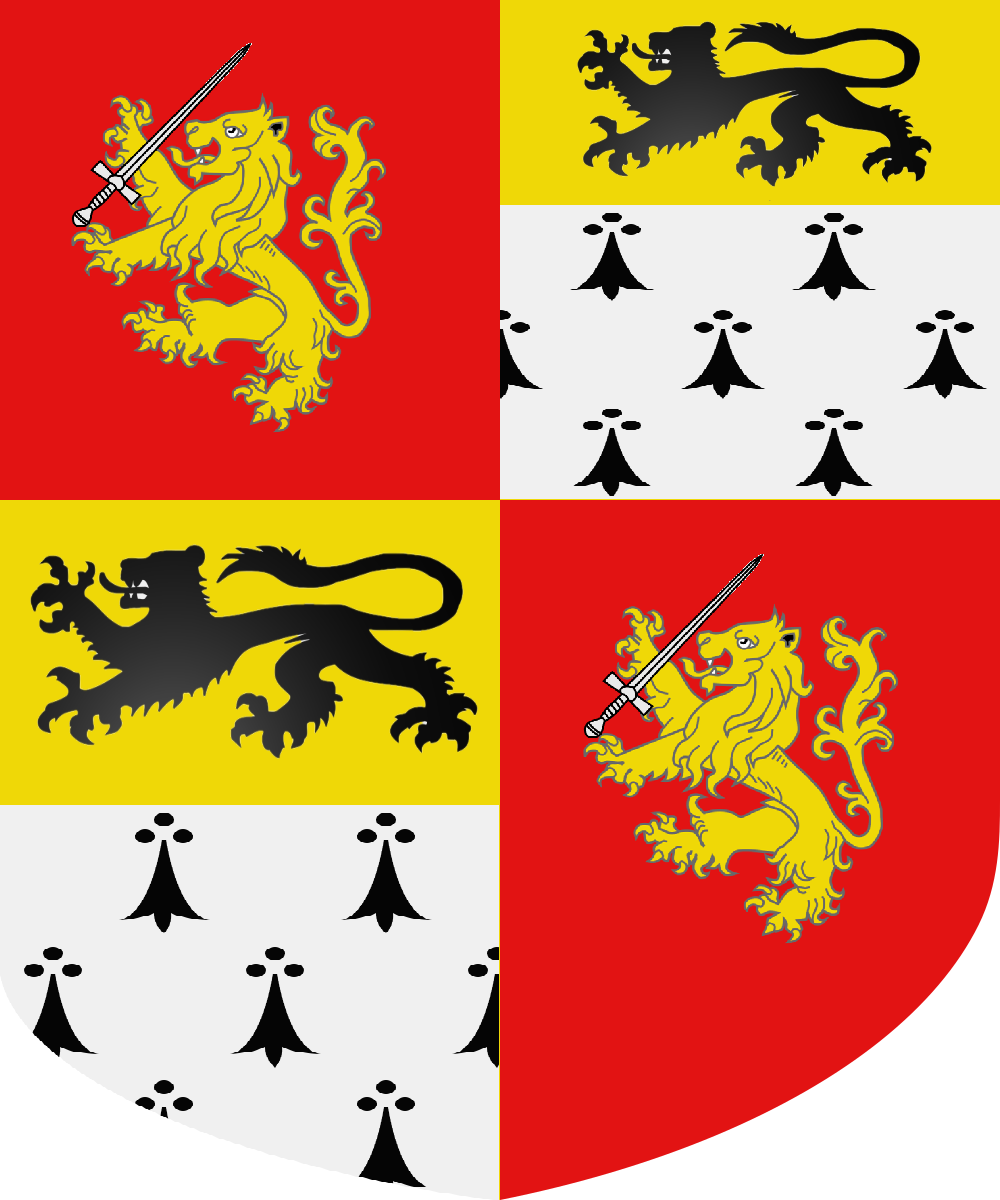
- Country: Italy
- Place of origin: Crema
- Founded: X century
- Titles: Marquis of Balsamo; Lord of Crema; Lord of Pandino; Lord of Misano; Lord of Agnadello; Count of Crema; Count of Pandino; Milanese Patrician; Venetian Patrician; Gonfaloniere; Bishop

The House of Benzoni (sometimes Venetianized as Benzon) was one of the most renowned patrician families of Crema, playing a leading role in Lombard political and military life from the Middle Ages through the modern era.

== Origins ==
The origins of the family are disputed.

According to the most widespread tradition, the Benzoni descended from Benzone, son of Bonicio Serosato, lieutenant of Emperor Otto I in Milan in 938.

Rachetti, a renowned historian from Crema, mentions that Benzone was also Duke and Royal Envoy in the city of Lodi, and that his descendants settled in the Crema area as early as the 10th century, coinciding with the destruction and reconstruction of Crema. The same document recalls that in 1102 a Benzone Benzoni signed a Concordia between the people of Piacenza, Parma, and Pontremoli; and in 1174 a Domerio Benzoni, consul of the city, signed the imperial act granting the Milanese the right to rebuild Crema.

Another tradition, reported by Pietro Terni, claims that the Benzoni descended from the Greppi: in the 13th century, a Giovanni Greppi is said to have given rise to a branch called Benzoni. In 1163, a Benzone was appointed general by Emperor Frederick Barbarossa, and by 1196 the family owned houses in the contrada di Civerchi, near San Michele.

Also mentioned is a Lantelmo Magro, or Benzone, who lived around 1150 and had children who branched into various lines.

Others claimed that the Benzoni had already been present in the Crema area since the early Middle Ages, possibly originating from the village of Parasso or from Palazzo Pignano, where a tradition records the presence of a Venturino Benzone of Parasso, listed among the 127 Christians martyred in Brescia in 120 AD for following Saints Faustino and Giovita.

== History ==
=== Rise in the Middle Ages ===
Between the 12th and 13th centuries, the Benzoni consolidated their power. They served as condottieri and as representatives of the people of Crema in relations with the Empire. The original branch was distinguished for its Guelph allegiance. In the 14th century, Venturino Benzoni the Elder was gonfaloniere of the Holy Church and Captain of the People in Milan. In 1315, Socino Benzoni expelled the Ghibellines and became the leading lord of Crema.

=== The Lordship of Crema ===
On 12 November 1403, with the death of Gian Galeazzo Visconti, the brothers Paolo and Bartolomeo Benzoni were acclaimed Lords of Crema after defeating the Ghibellines. They strengthened their rule by extending control over Pandino and fortifying the city, but both died of plague in 1405.

The lordship then passed to their cousin Giorgio Benzoni, who sought alliance with the Republic of Venice and obtained the title of Venetian patrician on 23 October 1407. However, under Filippo Maria Visconti, Crema returned to the Milanese orbit. Giorgio was formally named Lord of Crema, Pandino, Misano, and Agnadello (1414), but was forced to flee to Mantua and later Venice, where he served militarily for the Republic alongside his son Venturino.

=== Venetian Recognition and Austrian Confirmations ===
After the Venetian conquest of the Crema territory, the Benzoni (or Benzon) moved to Venice, settling in the parish of Sant’Agostin in San Polo. The Venetian Senate confirmed their titles by ducal decrees of 10 March 1662 and 1 October 1784.

With the fall of the Republic, the Austrian government reaffirmed their nobility and comital title by Sovereign Resolutions of 1 December 1817, 13 December 1819, and 29 October 1822.

=== Extinction ===
The family line in Crema died out with Luigi Benzoni (1795). Some branches survived in Venice and Rome, retaining noble titles confirmed even during the Austrian era.

== Alliances and Marriages ==
The Benzoni further consolidated their status through marriages with other noble houses, including the Lords and Dukes Visconti, the Marquises Zurla, the Counts Vimercati and the Counts Benvenuti.

A notable union was that of Paola Benzoni and Giovanni Battista Visconti, from whom was born Francesco Bernardino Visconti, the inspiration for the character of the Innominato in Manzoni’s The Betrothed.

== Ecclesiastical Ties ==
Several members of the Benzoni family also held prominent ecclesiastical positions. Some were appointed bishops and abbots, thus increasing the family’s influence not only politically but also religiously. Their presence in Lombard ecclesiastical institutions was constant and significant, helping to consolidate their image as moral and spiritual authorities.

== Notable Members ==
- Lantelmo Benzoni (XII century): Also called Lantelmo Greppi, general in the service of Frederick Barbarossa. Remained loyal to the Emperor even after the formation of the Lombard League. Remembered as a controversial figure, considered by some a “renegade.”
- Lantelmino Benzoni (†1316): Skilled jurist, known as “the Just.” In 1286 he mediated peace between Milan and Como, ratified also by Cremona, Piacenza, Brescia, Pavia, and Crema. Died in Cremona, buried in San Paolo.
- Venturino Benzoni il Vecchio (XIII–XIV century): Head of the Guelph faction in Crema, gonfaloniere of the Holy Church, and in 1303 Captain of the People of Milan. In 1309, signed a peace treaty between Guelphs and Ghibellines. Strangled to death after the Guelph defeat.
- Giorgio Benzoni (†1423): Count of Crema and Pandino, granted Venetian nobility. A powerful and controversial figure, accused of treason by rival families (including the Vimercati), and fell into disgrace under Filippo Maria Visconti.
- Venturino Benzoni il Giovane (XV century): Son of Giorgio; distinguished in tournaments and battles, including Zagonara, fighting for Venice. Served as commander of the broken lances corps for the Republic of Milan.
- Compagno Benzoni (XV century): Secured entry in Venice’s Libro d’Oro thanks to political support for the Republic. Granted a life annuity of 500 ducats, hereditary to his descendants.
- Socino Benzoni II (†1510): Venetian condottiero; took Lodi in 1499 and captured Ascanio Sforza and other prelates in Piacenza. Later betrayed Venice by siding with Louis XII of France. Arrested by Andrea Gritti and hanged in Padua in 1510.
- Rutilio Benzoni (ca. 1542-1613): Cleric, Bishop of Loreto (1586–1592), and of Recanati and Loreto (1592–1613).
- Leonardo Benzoni (†1552): Bishop of Volterra, Apostolic Protonotary, and Referendary of Justice. Studied in Paris; close to becoming a cardinal. Died at 55, buried in San Simeone.
- Giorgio Benzoni II (†1556): Man of letters and Venetian patrician. Friend of Benedetto Varchi, wrote biographies of Doges and composed sonnets. Died in Venice on 11 November 1556.
- Nicolò Benzoni (†1571): Brother of Giorgio II; captain in the War of Cyprus. Died at Famagusta fighting the Ottomans.
- Giorgio Benzoni III (†1695): Venetian patrician, Governor of Koroni during the Morean War (1684) and Podestà of Vicenza. Died unmarried in 1695.
- Luigi Benzoni (†1795): Last representative of the family in Crema. Remembered as a benefactor for public buildings and charities.
- Vittore Benzon (1779-1822): poet.
- Giuliana Benzoni (1895-1981).

== Residences ==
Of the homes built and inhabited by the Benzoni family, the following are particularly memorable:

- Palazzo Donati, Crema – Built by the Benzoni in the 16th century; later passed to the Scotti family by marriage.
- Palazzo Venturelli – In the 15th century, a Benzoni residence.
- Palazzo Benzoni, Crema – Documented since the 16th century; in the 17th century it was rebuilt by Roberto Benzoni, later enhanced by Giovanni Andrea Benzoni. With the extinction of the Crema branch (1795), the palace passed to the Frecavalli family. Today it houses the municipal library.
- Palazzo Orio Semitecolo Benzon, in Dorsoduro (Venice).
- Palazzo Querini Benzon, in San Marco (Venice).
- Villa Benzon (Caine–Franceschini–Piovesana), in Francenigo, Chiarano – Built by the Benzoni at the beginning of the 18th century; purchased by the Caine family in 1842.
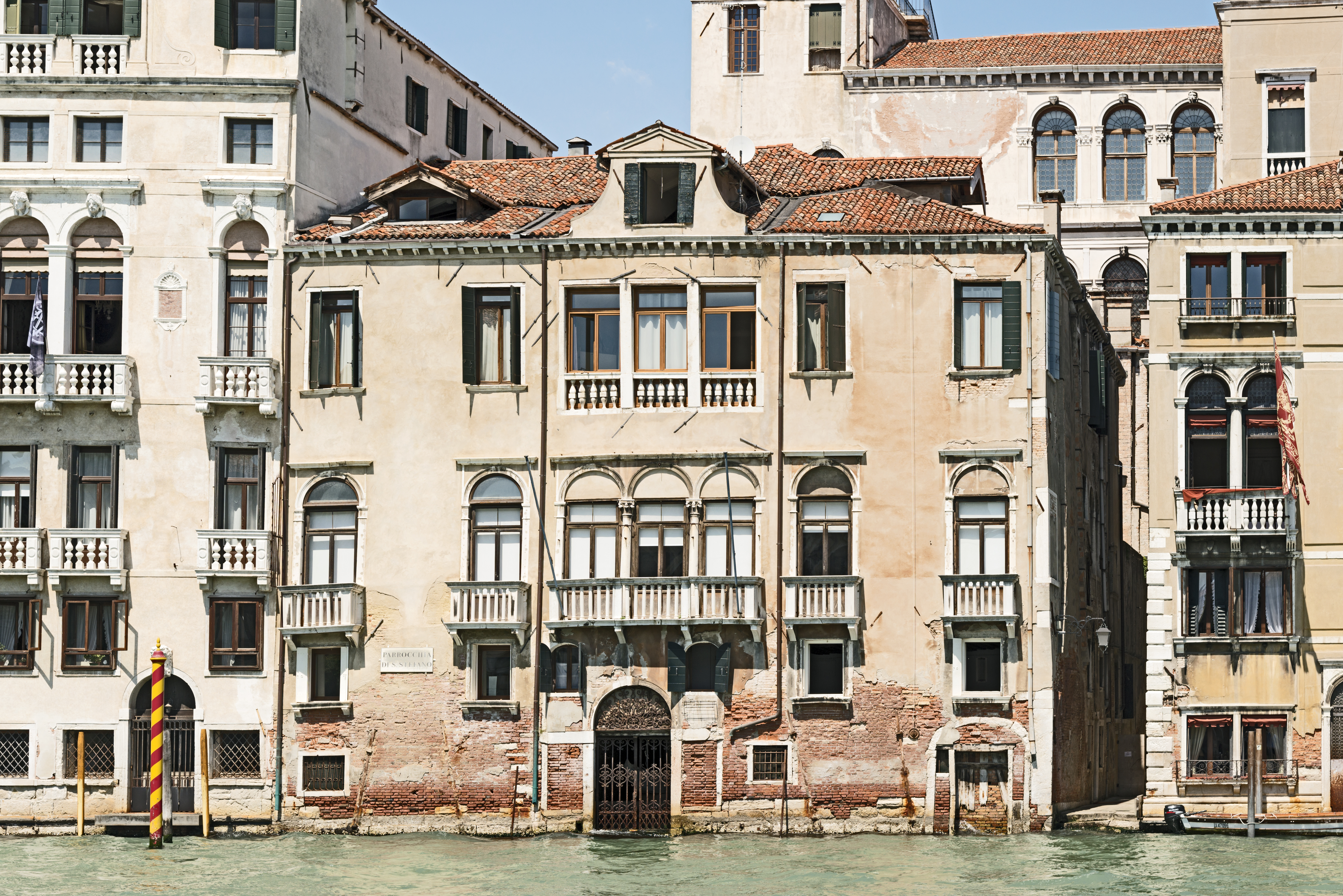
Palazzo Benzon Foscolo

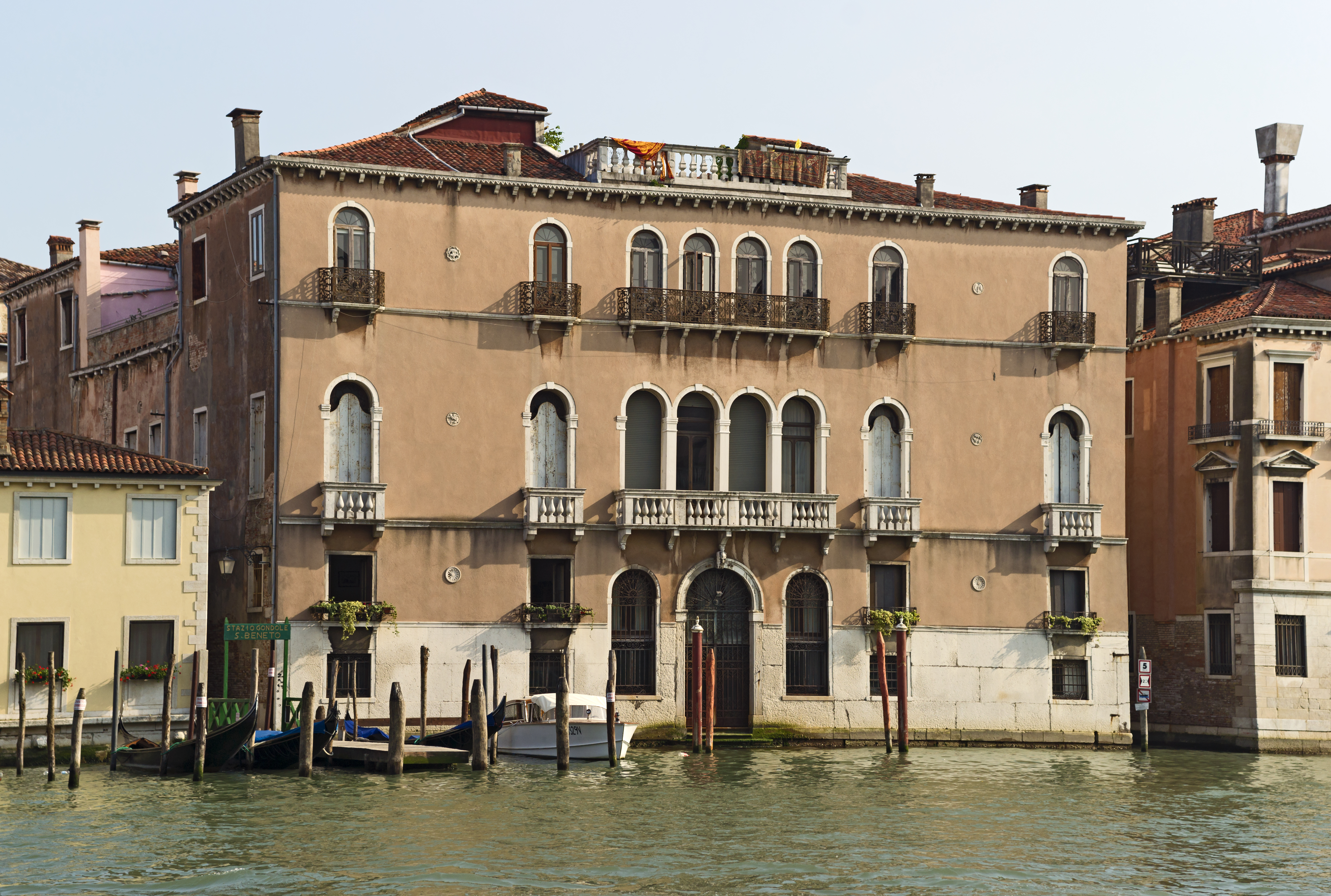
Palazzo Querini Benzon

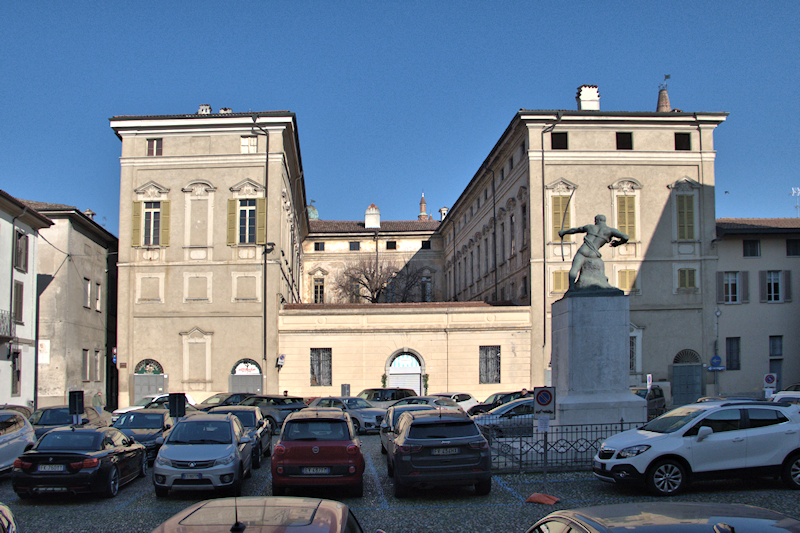
Palazzo Donati, già Benzoni in Crema

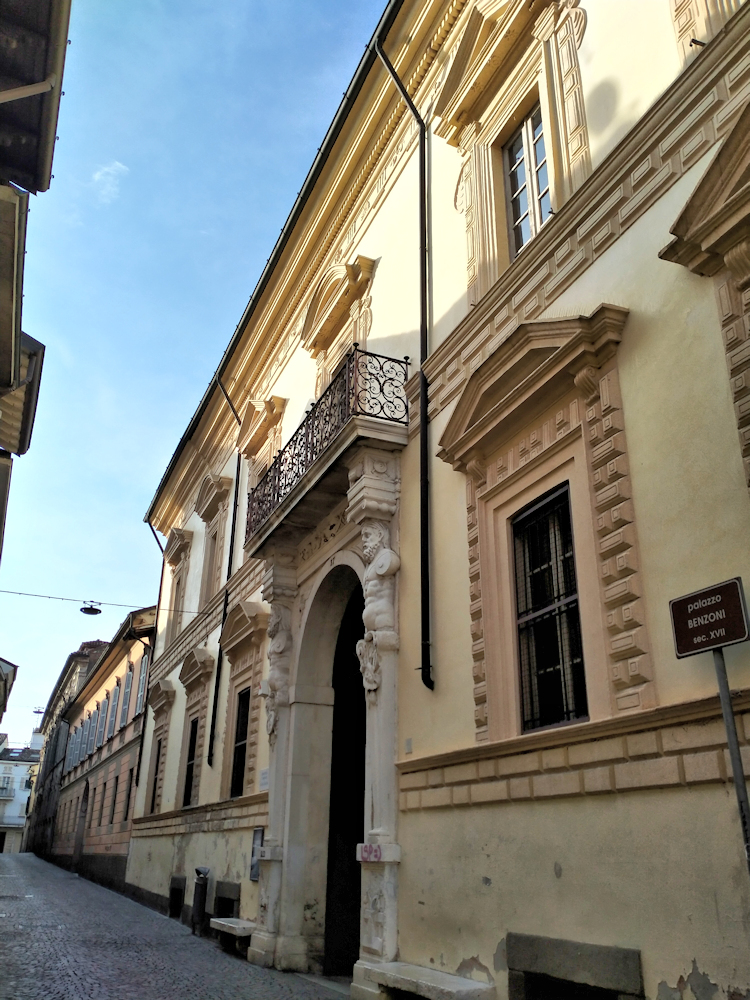
Palazzo Benzoni-Frecavalli in Crema

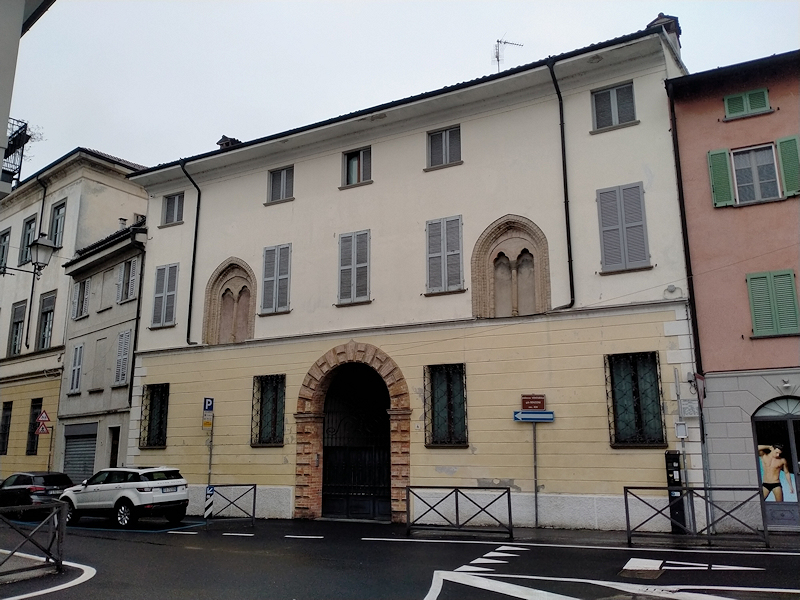
Palazzo Venturelli

== Namesake Family ==
There also existed a second Benzoni family, which, however, had no kinship ties with the former. They were merchants from the Bergamasque valleys and acquired the title of patricians in 1685, by offering the customary one hundred thousand ducats to finance the War of Morea against the Ottomans. To distinguish themselves from the earlier family, they were called “of San Vidal”, since they had settled in the present-day Palazzo Benzon-Foscolo, near the Church of San Vidal (San Marco). The only notable member was Archbishop Giovanni Maria (1670–1757), and the line became extinct before the end of the Republic.
