= Louis I of Etruria =

King of Etruria from 1801 to 1803

Louis I
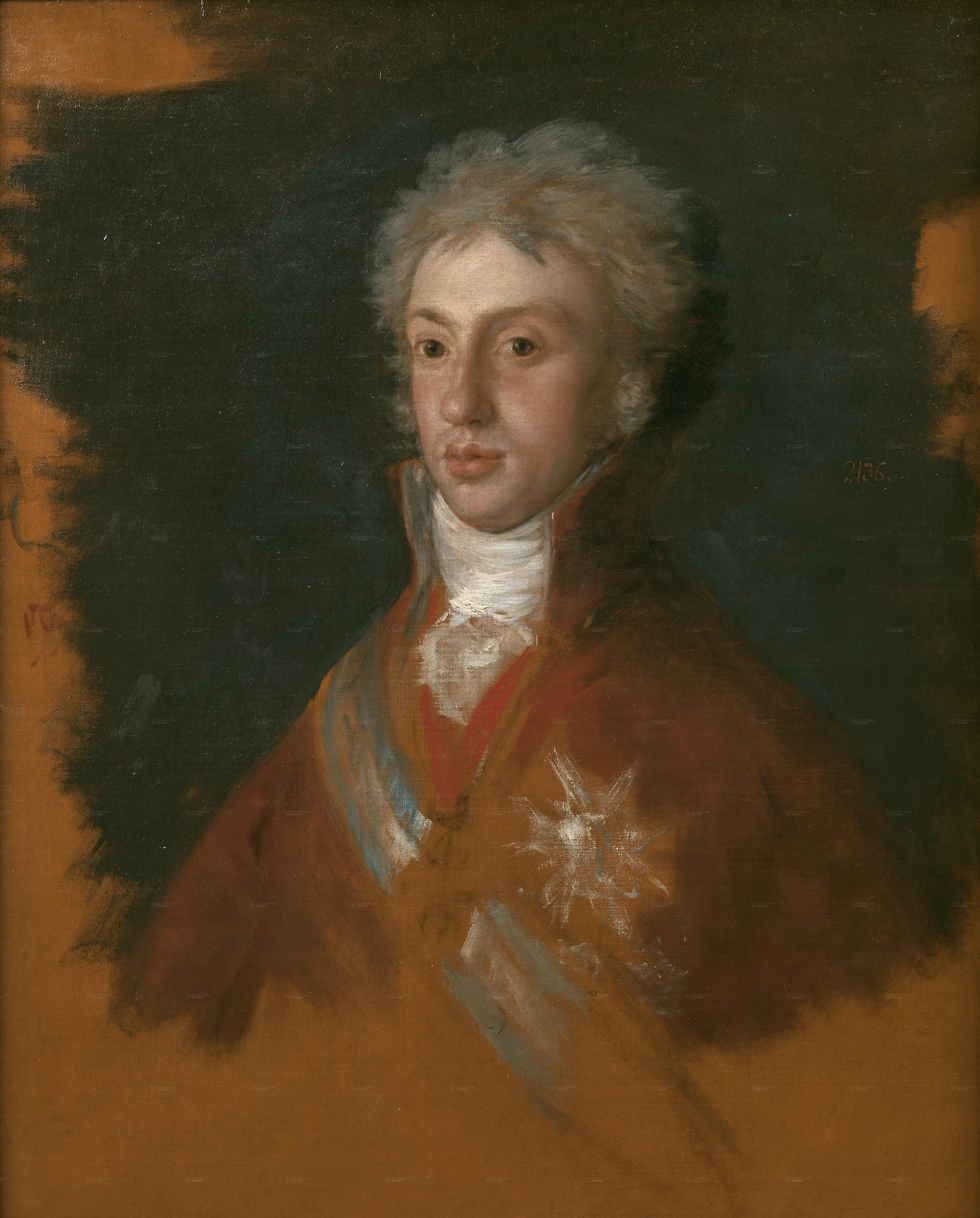
- Portrait by Goya, 1800

King of Etruria
- Reign: 21 March 1801 – 27 May 1803
- Predecessor: Ferdinand III as Grand Duke of Tuscany
- Successor: Louis II
- Born: 5 July 1773; Piacenza, Duchy of Parma
- Died: 27 May 1803 (aged 29); Florence, Kingdom of Etruria
- Burial: El Escorial
- Spouse: Maria Luisa of Spain (m. 1795)
- Issue: Charles II, Duke of Parma; Maria Luisa Carlota, Hereditary Princess of Saxony
Names
- Italian: Ludovico Francesco Filiberto di Borbone-Parma; Spanish: Luis Francisco Filiberto de Borbón-Parma y Austria; English: Louis Francis Philibert of Bourbon-Parma
- House: Bourbon-Parma
- Father: Ferdinand, Duke of Parma
- Mother: Maria Amalia of Austria
- Religion: Roman Catholicism

Louis I (Italian: Ludovico I; 5 July 1773 – 27 May 1803) was the first of the two kings of Etruria. Louis was the son of Ferdinand, Duke of Parma, and Maria Amalia of Austria. He was born in 1773, when his great-grandfather, King Louis XV of France, was still alive.

== Early life ==
Louis Francis Philibert (Italian: Ludovico Francesco Filiberto) was the second child and eldest son of Ferdinand, Duke of Parma, a grandson of French King Louis XV and Marie Leczinska, and his wife Archduchess Maria Amalia of Austria. Louis and his older sister Carolina were the favorites of their parents. They were personally instructed in religion by their father, despite the fact that their younger children was actually more interested in the subject than they were. In 1778, he hit his head on a marble table while playing with Carolina, and afterward suffered from epilepsy.

== Marriage and issue ==
In 1795, Louis came to the Spanish court to finish his education and also to marry one of the daughters of King Charles IV of Spain, who were his first cousins. He was to marry Infanta Maria Amalia or Infanta Maria Luisa, and chose the latter, who was somewhat more attractive and cheerful than the melancholy Maria Amalia. On 25 August 1795, he married Maria Luisa at Madrid and was made an Infante of Spain.

The marriage between the two different personalities turned out to be happy, though it was clouded by Louis's ill health. He was frail, suffered chest problems, and since a childhood accident when he hit his head on a marble table, suffered from symptoms that have been identified as epileptic fits. As the years went on, his health deteriorated, and he grew to be increasingly dependent on his wife. The young couple remained in Spain during the early years of their marriage.

The couple had two children:

- Charles Louis Ferdinand (1799-1883)
- Maria Luisa Carlota, Hereditary Princess of Saxony (1802-1857), married to Maximilian, Hereditary Prince of Saxony, widower of her aunt Caroline, as his second wife and remained childless.

== Swap of Parma and Etruria ==
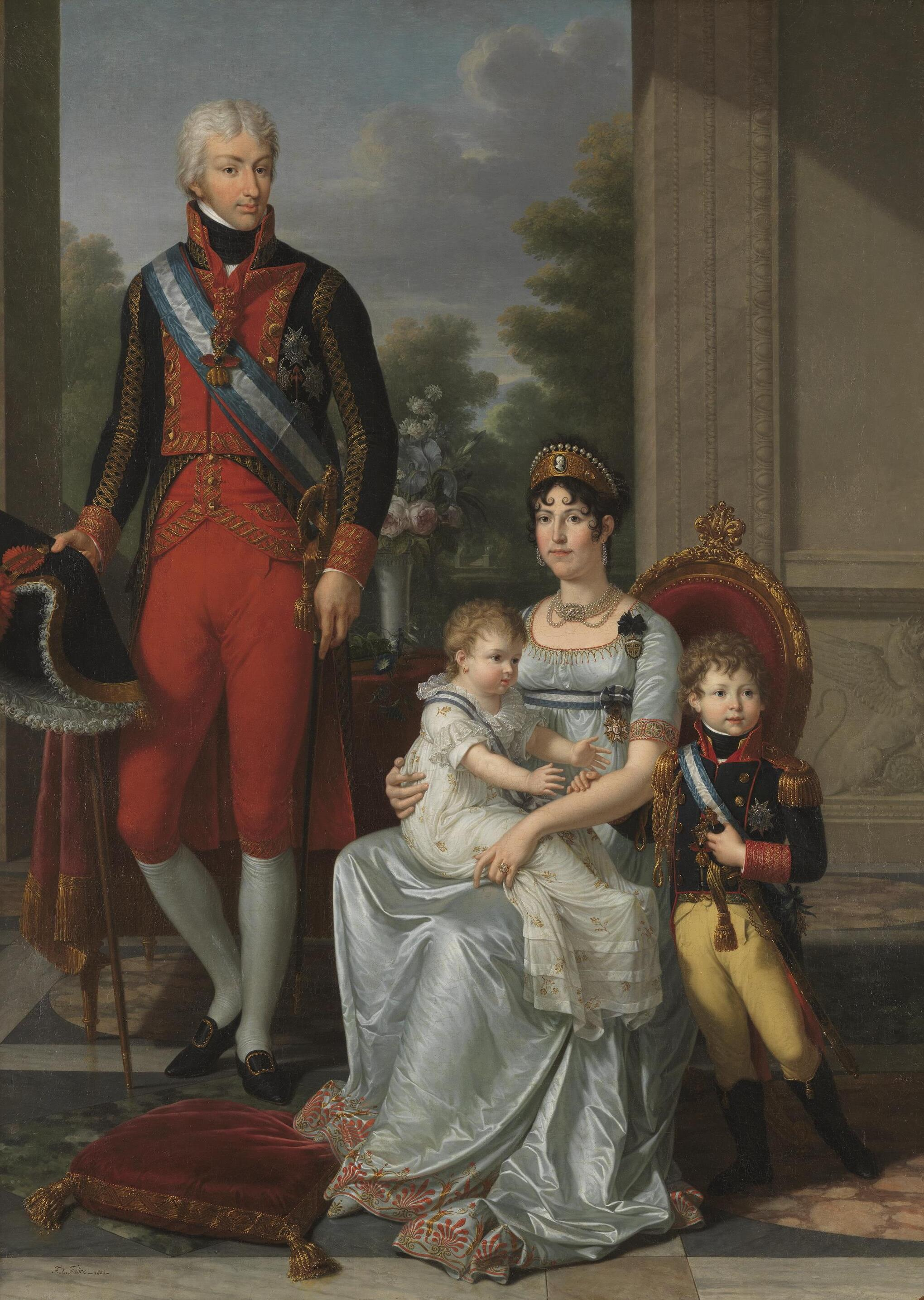
The Family of the King of Etruria

While Louis was staying in Spain, the Duchy of Parma had been occupied by French troops in 1796. Napoleon Bonaparte, who had conquered most of Italy and wanted to gain Spain as an ally against Britain, proposed to compensate the House of Bourbon for their loss of the Duchy of Parma with the Kingdom of Etruria, a new state that he created from the Grand Duchy of Tuscany. This was agreed upon in the Treaty of Aranjuez.

Louis had to receive his investiture from Napoleon in Paris, before taking possession of Etruria. Louis, his wife and his son travelled incognito through France under the name of the Count of Livorno. Having been invested in Paris as King of Etruria, Louis and his family arrived in August 1801 at his new capital, Florence.

In 1802, both Louis and his pregnant wife travelled to Spain to attend the double-wedding of Maria Luisa's brother Fernando and her youngest sister Maria Isabel. Offshore at Barcelona, Maria Luisa gave birth to their daughter, Marie Louise Charlotte. The couple returned in December of that year, after having been notified of the death of Louis's father.

Back in Etruria, Louis's health worsened, and in May 1803, he died at the age of twenty-nine, possibly due to an epileptic crisis. He was succeeded by his son, Charles Louis, as King Louis II of Etruria, under the regency of his mother, Maria Luisa.

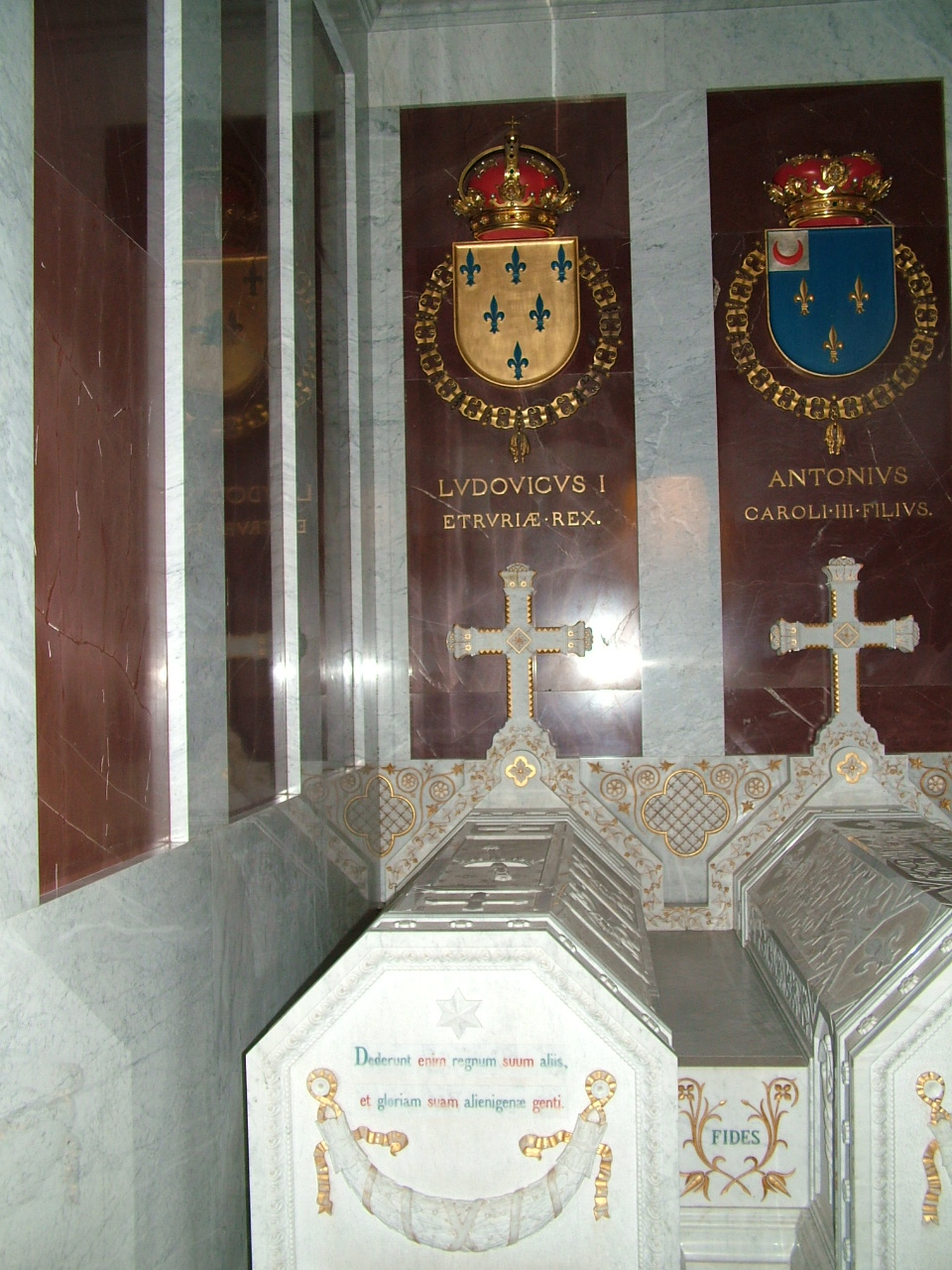
Tomb of Louis I in El Escorial

Louis I of Etruria House of Bourbon Cadet branch of the Capetian dynasty Born: 5 July 1773 Died: 27 May 1803
Regnal titles
Preceded by Ferdinand III as Grand Duke of Tuscany	King of Etruria; 1801–1803	Succeeded by Louis II
