= Gaspare Vimercati =

Italian condottiero (c. 1410–1467)

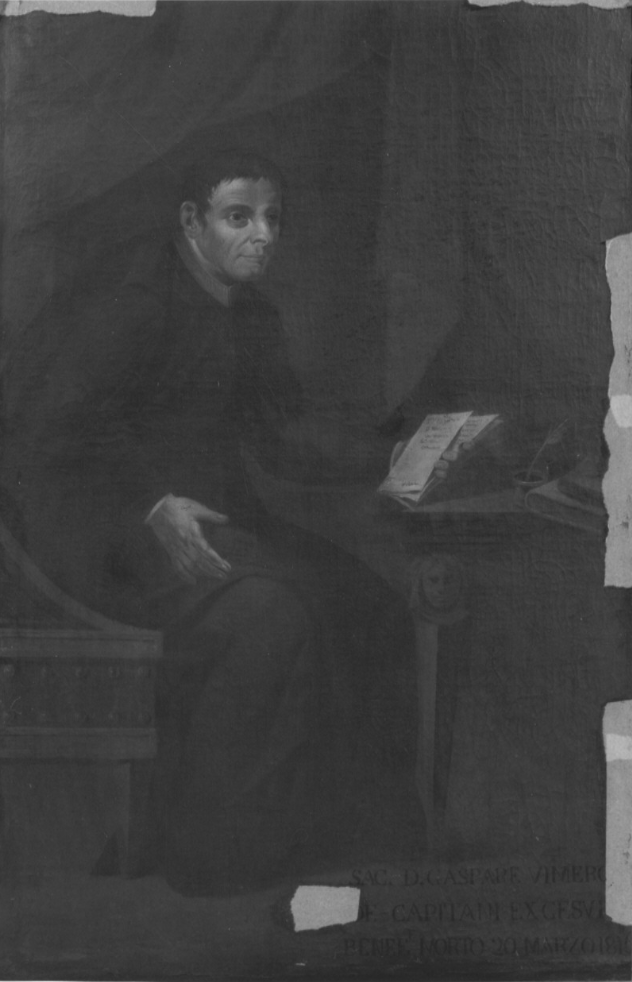

Republican Commissioner of Crema
- Monarch: Golden Ambrosian Republic

Defender of Liberty
- Monarch: Golden Ambrosian Republic

Ducal Treasurer

Count
- Monarchs: Francesco I Sforza; Galeazzo Maria Sforza

Personal details
- Born: ca. 1410 Milan
- Died: 1467 Novara
- Resting place: Santa Maria delle Grazie (Milan)
- Awards: Count of Valenza

Military service
- Allegiance: Duchy of Milan; Golden Ambrosian Republic
- Years of service: 1433-1467
- Rank: Commander
- Battles/wars: Campaigns in Naples and the Marche (1433–1434); War of the Ambrosian Republic against Venice (1447–1449); Capture of Milan by Francesco Sforza (1450); Wars of Leno and Valenza (1452–1454); Genoa Campaign (1464); French Campaign against Burgundy (1465); Battle of Molinella (1467)

Count Gaspare Vimercati (sometimes also recorded as Gaspare da Vimercate) (c. 1410 – 1467), was an Italian condottiero who served under Francesco Sforza. He belonged to the ancient and important family of the Captains of Vimercate. Gaspare was one of the leading figures of Lombard political and military life in the mid‑15th century, distinguishing himself as a loyal supporter of Francesco Sforza and later of his son Galeazzo Maria. He played a crucial role in the fall of the Ambrosian Republic, in the management of ducal finances, and in the foundation of the church of Santa Maria delle Grazie in Milan.

== Origins and family ==
Gaspare was born around 1410 in Milan, into a family that was embedded in the Visconti nobility. His father, Taddiolo (Taddeo) Vimercati, son of Giovanni (referendary of Bernabò Visconti), was a jurist and ducal official, repeatedly entrusted by Filippo Maria Visconti with important political and diplomatic missions. His mother, Caterina Arese, came from an ancient Milanese lineage; a relative, Andriolo Arese, had been secretary to Gian Galeazzo Visconti. The Vimercati were counted among the Captains of Vimercate, one of the oldest and most prestigious families of Brianza, traditionally linked to the Visconti lordship. Gaspare grew up in an environment steeped in politics and courtly culture, and was early directed towards a military career. Among his most influential relatives was his cousin Corradino Vimercati, a secret counselor and attorney for Filippo Maria Visconti in numerous acts of government. Gaspare consolidated his position by marrying Lantelmina Secco, a member of one of the most powerful families of the Gera d'Adda, related to illustrious houses such as the Visconti and the Secco Borella, and Lords of Caravaggio.

== Military and political career ==
=== Early years and alliance with Francesco Sforza ===
From adolescence, Gaspare followed Francesco Sforza as a man‑at‑arms, remaining tied to him throughout his life. He took part with him in military campaigns in the Kingdom of Naples and the Marche (1433–1434), distinguishing himself for loyalty and tactical skill. This devotion earned him the reputation of being a man of Sforza’s "unlimited trust". During the same period, he also joined the council of Filippo Maria Visconti, gaining political as well as military experience.

=== Commissioner of Crema ===
With the fall of the Visconti and the proclamation of the Ambrosian Republic (1447), Vimercati was appointed commissioner of Crema, a city of great strategic importance. There he ruled with full powers, supported by his brother‑in‑law Giorgio Secco, the podestà, promoting the interests of his own family and their local allies. In 1448, he consolidated control of the city with decisive measures: he had the rebellious castellan Francesco Barbieri hanged and used an ingenious stratagem to expel the Guelphs by forging an official expulsion order. This temporarily strengthened Ghibelline power. In 1449, he was elected among the 24 Defenders of Liberty of the Ambrosian Republic. In Crema, he defended the city against Sigismondo Pandolfo Malatesta, conducting sorties in which he spiked enemy bombards, burned bastions, and destroyed trenches. However, political instability and Francesco Sforza’s ambiguous strategy forced him to leave Crema after a popular uprising. He withdrew to Milan, where he became one of the leading heads of the pro‑Sforza faction.

=== Fall of the Ambrosian Republic and appointment as Count ===
On 21 February 1450, Gaspare was among the protagonists of the coup that delivered Milan to Francesco Sforza. He gathered his retainers in the Porta Nuova district, stormed the public palace, freed the prisoners, and led the uprisings that culminated in the killing of the Venetian ambassador Leonardo Venier. A few days later, together with six Milanese nobles, he took part in the official ceremony that invested Francesco Sforza as Duke, having the honor of girding him with the sword, symbol of ducal power. As a reward, Sforza named him Count of Valenza and Count of Vimercate, a title conferred in a private ceremony that emphasized his close personal ties to the Duke and the Sforza family. From then on, Vimercati was a constant presence at court, both in public ceremonies and in the private life of the ducal household.

== Man‑at‑arms and counselor ==
Vimercati commanded one of the duchy's most important military companies, composed of about 300 cavalry, organized into four squads. Its level of equipment and discipline was so high that it was described as a "model company". In 1452, he fought at Leno against Carlo Gonzaga; in 1453, with only 40 cavalry, he ambushed and captured several enemy captains. During the Italian wars, he relied on trusted men such as Giovanni Antonio da Milano, Villano da Bologna, Costa di Calabria, and Rizarello da Normeto, along with light cavalry contingents under the command of the Danesino.

=== Diplomat and financier ===
Vimercati was also a skilled politician and financier, de facto overseeing the Sforza ducal finances. He exploited his ties with the Medici Bank to obtain vital loans for ducal finances at a time when the state treasury was often in crisis. Between 1455 and 1463, he secured large sums without offering personal guarantees, a sign of the confidence he inspired. He took part in delicate missions, and in 1459, he welcomed Roberto da San Severino returning from the Holy Land, and in the same year he met in Milan with French ambassadors supporting the claims of John II, Duke of Lorraine, to Genoa and Naples.

=== Genoa campaign ===
In 1464, he led the campaign to occupy Genoa and the Riviera di Levante. After encamping at Cornigliano while awaiting reinforcements, he entered the city with Obietto Fieschi and Donato del Conte, seizing the ducal palace. He besieged the Castelletto, defended by Bartolomea Fregoso, which capitulated after forty days, thanks in part to heavy artillery bombardment.

=== French campaign ===
In 1465, he accompanied the ducal heir Galeazzo Maria Sforza to France, leading about 3,000 men (2,000 cavalry and 1,000 infantry). They presented themselves to King Louis XI. Operating in the Rhône valley, he captured several castles, enhancing Sforza military prestige on the international stage.

=== Battle of Molinella ===
In 1467, he took part in the famous Battle of Molinella, fought by the Sforza–Medici–Aragonese alliance against Venice and Bartolomeo Colleoni, alongside Federico da Montefeltro and Angelo della Stufa.

== Final years and death ==
After the death of Francesco Sforza in 1466, Gaspare remained a key figure for the regency of Bianca Maria Visconti and for the young Galeazzo Maria, continuing to provide loans and military support. In September 1467, during the campaign against Venice, he fell ill in the field and was taken to Novara, where he died on 4 September. He was buried in the church of Santa Maria delle Grazie in Milan, which he himself had founded on land once used as his troops' encampment. He was depicted kneeling with a sword in hand in a painting attributed to Bernardino Zenale. The title of Count of Valenza was transferred to a brother of Duke Galeazzo Maria. His company was incorporated into the lance spezzate, marking the end of his personal military command.

== Biography ==
- Michele Mauri (2002), Translated: Triptych from Vimercate. Gian Giacomo Caprotti, known as Salai. Gaspare da Vimercate. Gian Giacomo Gallarati Scotti, Missaglia (ISBN 88-86832-89-3)
