= Festival Puccini =

Annual Italian summer opera festival

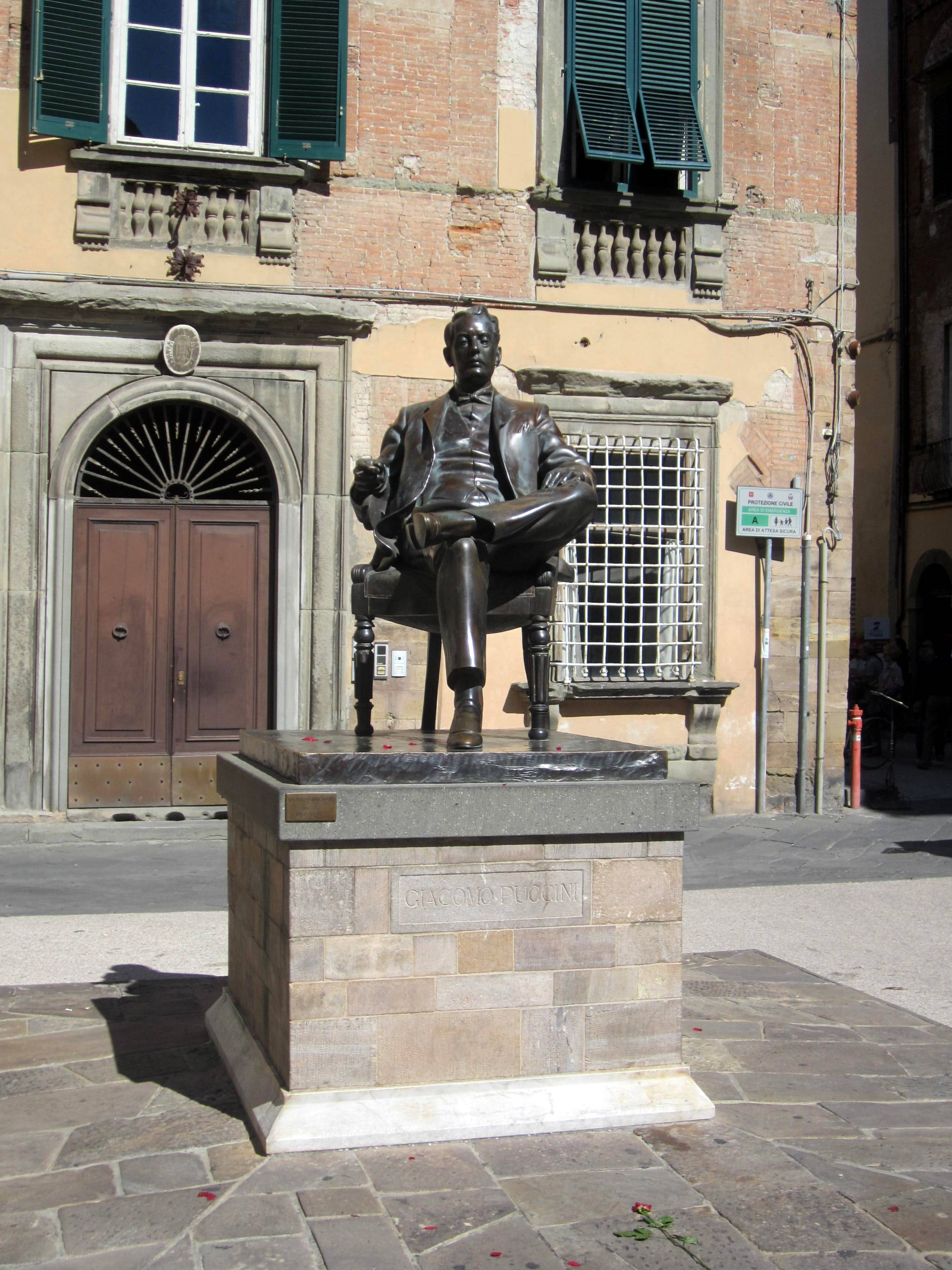
Monument to Puccini close to his birthplace in the nearby town of Lucca

The Festival Puccini (Puccini Festival) is an annual summer opera festival held in July and August to present the operas of the famous Italian composer Giacomo Puccini.

The Festival is located in Torre del Lago, Italy, a town located between Lago di Massaciuccoli and the Tyrrhenian Sea, 4 kilometres (2.5 mi) from the beaches of Viareggio on the Tuscan Riviera and 18 kilometres (11 mi) from Pisa and Lucca, Puccini's birthplace.

In presenting four or five performances of up to four operatic productions each season, the Festival attracts about forty thousand spectators to its open-air theatre, the Teatro dei Quattromila (so named for its seating capacity, although 3,200 seats were actually installed), located very close to the "Villa Puccini," the house which the composer had built in 1900 and in which he lived and worked on his major operas until pollution from the lake forced him to settle in Viareggio in 1921. Along with other members of his family who died later, Puccini is buried in a small chapel inside the Villa, in a room transformed into a mausoleum after his death.

== Origins ==
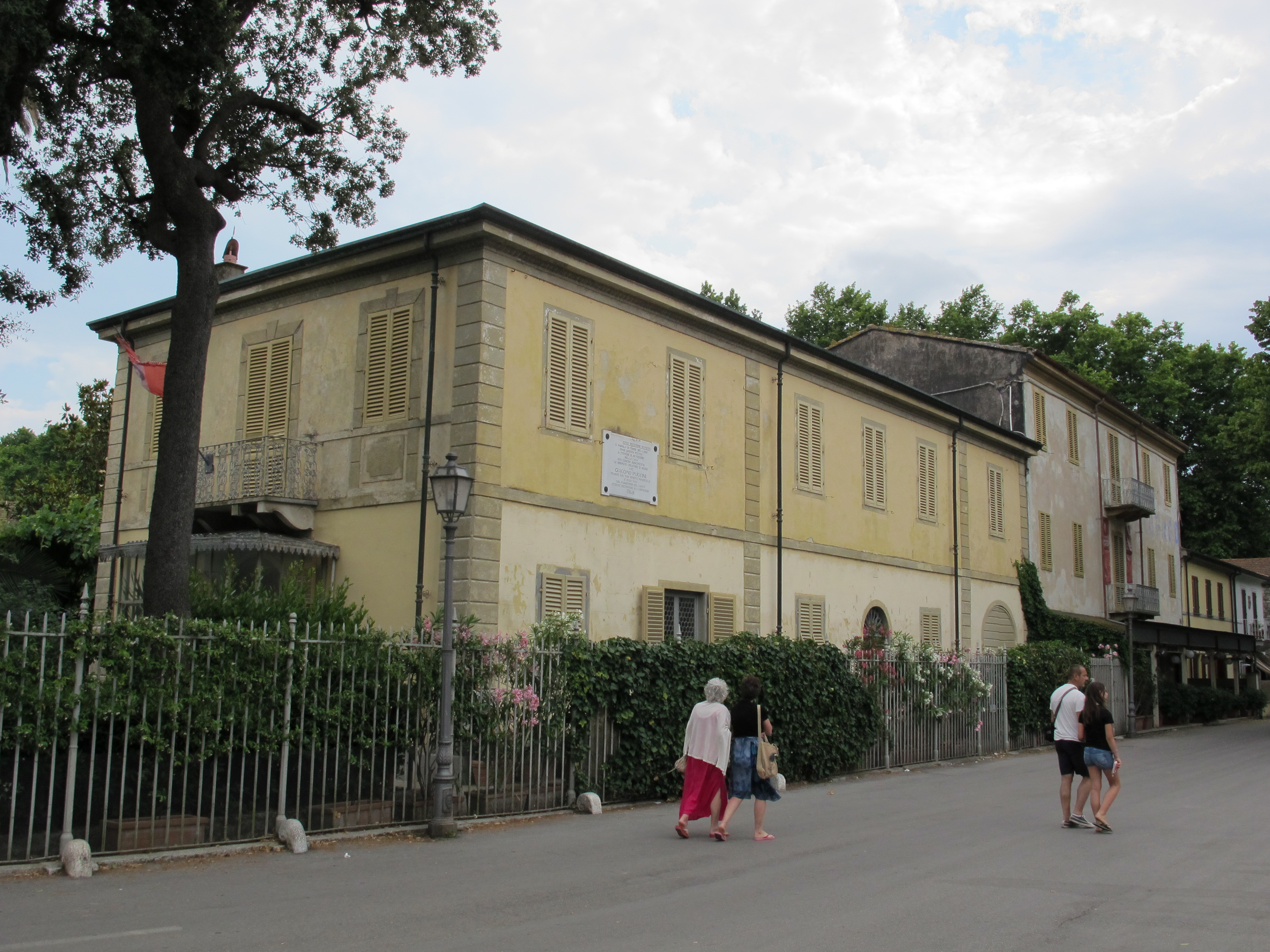
The Villa Puccini

The Puccini Festival was started in 1930 following what is believed to have been Puccini's comment to friend Giovacchino Forzano, one of his librettists, in 1924 just before he left for the clinic in Brussels for his throat operation: "I always come out here and take a boat to go and shoot snipes … but once I would like to come here and listen to one of my operas in the open air." The composer was thought to be expressing the hope that his operas would be performed in the extraordinary natural stage offered by the Massaciuccoli Lake. However, this was disputed by his granddaughter, Simonetta Puccini.

Nevertheless, on 24 August 1930, together with Pietro Mascagni, who had been fellow student of Puccini's, Forzano produced the first performances of a Puccini opera on the lake shore, in front of the Maestro's house. In a provisional theatre, the Carro di Tespi Lirico with its stage built on piles stuck in the lake, a travelling opera company performed La bohème directed by Forzano and conducted by Mascagni. The same company came back in 1931 when Beniamino Gigli and Adelaide Saraceni performed in La bohème, while Rosetta Pampanini and Angelo Michetti performed Madama Butterfly. This was the beginning of what was to become a major opera festival.

However, in the years before 1949, due to the political and financial climate, there was only one presentation—in 1937—and that was a concert. Returning in 1949 to commemorate the 25th anniversary of Puccini's death, the Festival re-opened with La fanciulla del West and continued into the 1950s with many of the composer's most well known works.

== Festival expansion since the 1990s ==
Not until 1966, when the Festival site was moved to reclaimed land just north of and near to the small lake harbour, did the Puccini Festival became an annual summer event. With its small villages on the opposite shore, whose flickering lights at night provide unforgettable natural scenery to complement the performances taking place on the stage, the location proved a success, although the theatre's ultra modern design and size have sometimes been drawbacks.

After the creation of the Puccini Festival Foundation in 1990, achieved in order to put the event on a more established financial footing, plans were put in place to create a new open-air theatre with up-to-date facilities and acoustics. The town authorities of Viareggio purchased 270,000 square feet (25,000 m^{2}) of land to create the Parco della Musica (Music Park) and on it constructed the Teatro al Aperto (the Outdoor Theatre) now seating 3,200. In addition, other facilities for rehearsals and workshops were built, along with a 600-seat covered studio theatre. The Teatro al Aperto was built to take advantage of the view across Massaciuccoli Lake in the background.

=== Recent production history ===
In over seventy years of the Festival, the stage of Torre del Lago has hosted the most famous and acclaimed names of world opera. Among them was Tito Gobbi, who also made his début as director in Tosca; Mario del Monaco, who chose the Festival as his farewell to the stage in Il Tabarro, and many others who began or ended extraordinary careers.

In 2000, 70th anniversary of Forzano and Mascagni's initiative, the 46th Puccini Festival presented two major new productions, Madama Butterfly and Tosca. In addition, the program included Puccini's first opera, Le Villi, presented in concert, with performances by Katia Ricciarelli and Josè Cura. In 2004 the Puccini Festival celebrated its 50th anniversary by a season featuring two great events: one was a new production of Madama Butterfly celebrating the centenary of its première in Brescia on 28 May 1904. It was conducted by Plácido Domingo with Daniela Dessì and Fabio Armiliato in the leading roles. The second was a special evening dedicated to Puccini's heroines, presenting the most beloved arias from the Maestro's favourite characters, with Plácido Domingo narrating as Puccini.

The 2006 season was unique in that a production of La fanciulla del West was presented rather later in the traditional season with follow-up performances in Monaco in October. Many productions originating at the festival have gone on to appear in opera houses throughout the world.

== See also ==
- List of opera festivals
