= Torre del Lago Puccini railway station =

Train station in Italy

Coordinates: 43°49′36″N 10°17′26″E

Torre del Lago Puccini railway station is a railway station on the Genoa–Pisa railway, and serves the hamlet of the same name in the commune of Viareggio.

== History ==
Until 1939 the station was simply known as Torre Del Lago. In 2007 the station was rebuilt to include more parking.

== Layout ==
The station is unstaffed. It has two platforms; the platform on the side of the station facing the hills is largely used for services to Pisa, whereas the other, on the side of the station facing the sea, is used for services towards La Spezia.

Between the 1930s and the 1980s, a branch line left the station to the west towards the Torre del Lago bogland, to serve the silicate mines.

== Services ==
The station is served by regional Trenitalia services stipulated in an agreement with the Regione Toscana known as "Memorario".

== Facilities ==
The station has

- Automatic ticket machine

== Interchanges ==
The station has interchange with:

- Bus stop

== Bibliography ==
- Rete Ferroviaria Italiana. "Fascicolo Linea 99 (La Spezia Centrale-Livorno Centrale)".
- Strade Ferrate del Mediterraneo, Album dei Piani Generali delle stazioni, fermate, cave, cantieri, officine e diramazioni a Stabilimenti privati alla data 1º gennaio 1894, Tip. Lit. Direz. Gen. Ferr. Mediterraneo, Milano, 1895. Tavola 132. Stazione di Migliarino, stazione di Pietrasanta, stazione di Torre del Lago, stazione di Serravezza, stazione di Viareggio, stazione di Massa.
- Ennio Morando e altri, Ricordi di rotaie. Nodi, linee, costruzioni e soppressioni in Italia dal 1839 ai giorni nostri. Volume secondo nodi principali & nodi complementari, Padova, Il Prato, 2002. ISBN 88-87243-43-3.
- Adriano Betti Carboncini, La torbiera di Torre del Lago e l'elettrificazione ferroviaria. Binari a Viareggio, Cortona, Calosci, 2004. ISBN 88-7785-200-3.

== See also ==
- Lago di Massaciuccoli
- Torre del Lago Puccini
