= Villa Puccini =

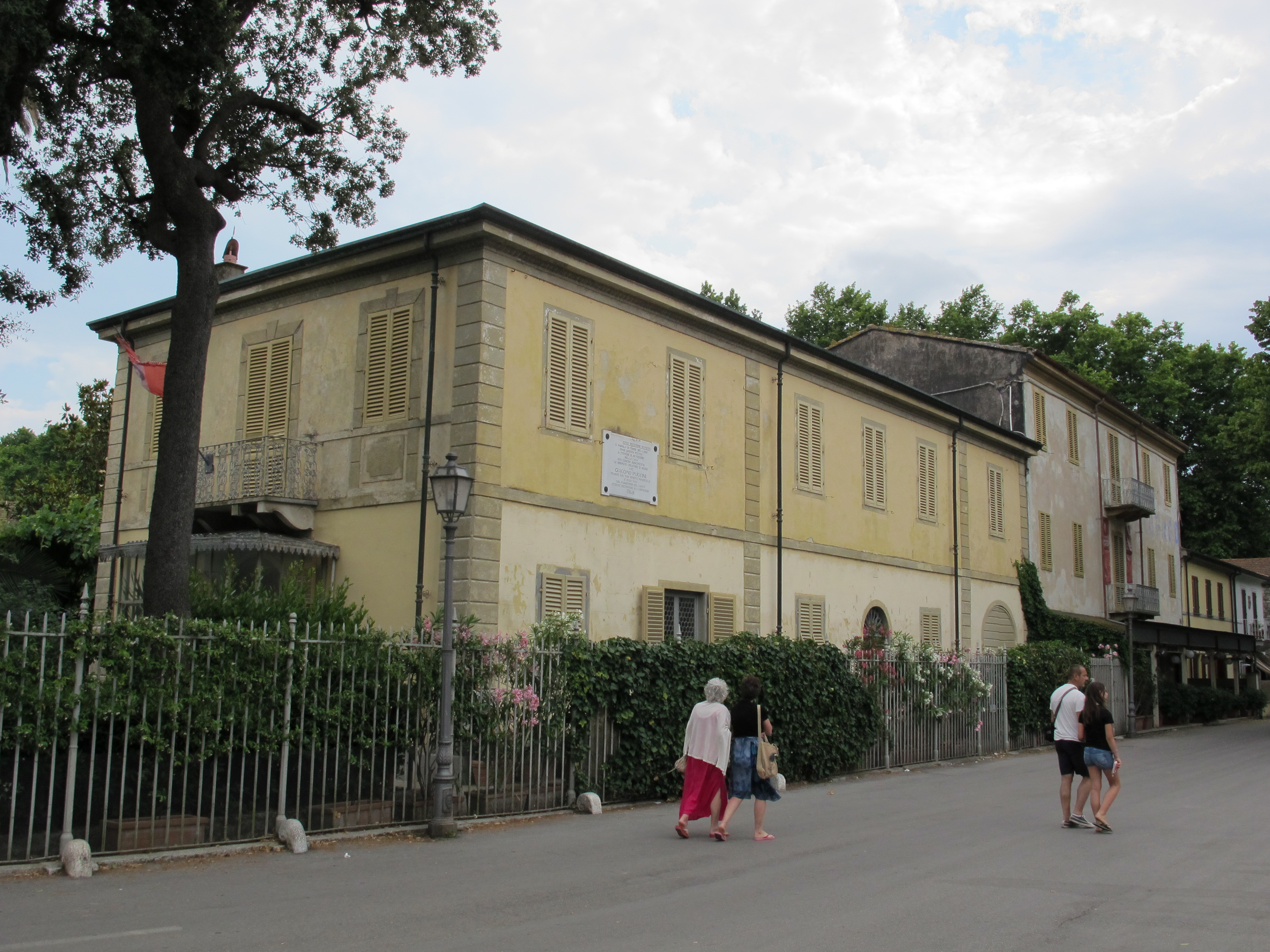

General information
- Location: Torre del Lago
- Address: Viale Puccini 266
- Town or city: Viareggio, Tuscany
- Country: Italy
- Coordinates: 43°49′57.03″N 10°18′21.78″E

Website
- www.giacomopuccini.it/en/villa-puccini

Villa Puccini is a cultural site in Torre del Lago, near Viareggio in Tuscany, Italy. It is a museum dedicated to the composer Giacomo Puccini, who lived here from 1900 to 1921.

== History and description ==
From 1891, the composer and his family spent summers at Torre del Lago. Puccini bought a property in 1899 on the shore of Lake Massaciuccoli, and it was renovated, becoming his permanent residence. He worked here on many of his operas, from Manon Lescaut (first performed in 1893) to Il trittico (1918).

He moved to Viareggio in 1921, where he began his last opera Turandot. He died in 1924 in Brussels, after a throat operation.

Giacomo Puccini's son Antonio turned the building into a museum in 1925. The composer was buried in 1926 in a chapel created by Antonio in the villa.

The composer's granddaughter Simonetta Puccini became the owner of the villa in 1996. The Simonetta Puccini Foundation was established in 2005; an objective was to restore the villa to its appearance when inhabited. The composer's two pianos in the villa, by Förster and Steinway & Sons, were renovated in 2010. There was restoration in 2012 of the roof and of the façade, which regained its original colour of about 1900. In 2015 the bedroom of Giacomo and his wife Elvira was restored to its appearance in 1905, when the composer renovated the furnishings in shades of green; other room on the upper floor were also restored. In 2017 the parquet floor of the dining room was restored.

=== Auditorium and Archive ===
The Simonetti Puccini Auditorium, inaugurated in August 2021, is in a building next to the villa. It seats 99; concerts, conferences and other events may be held.

The building also houses the offices of the Foundation, and the Puccini Archive. There are about 28,500 documents in the archive, including about 10,500 letters and 1,500 musical manuscripts, and some 2,100 photographs. There is also the family musical library, that came to Giacomo Puccini from his musician ancestors. Documents may be available to scholars on request.

== See also ==
- List of music museums
