= Simonetta Puccini =

Descendant of composer Giacomo Puccini (1929–2017)

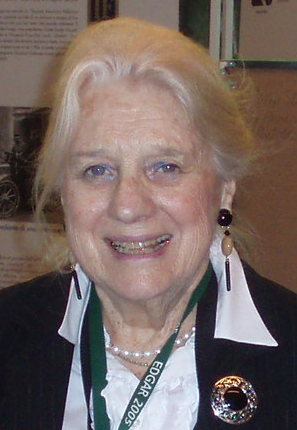
Simonetta Puccini in 2005

Simonetta Puccini (born Giurumello; 2 June 1929 in Pisa – 16 December 2017 in Milan) was the last surviving acknowledged descendant of the composer Giacomo Puccini. She dedicated her life to her grandfather's memory, and owned and restored the composer's home, Villa Museo Puccini.

== Heir to Puccini ==
Simonetta Giurumello was born in 1929 as an illegitimate daughter of Giacomo Puccini's only son, Antonio, who had no children by his wife. She graduated from the University of Milan and was a teacher until 1973.

The composer had died in 1924, leaving a large fortune in property and royalties. In 1995, after a legal battle that started in 1980, Simonetta was declared to be Antonio's daughter and was assigned one-third of her grandfather's (now greatly diminished) estate, which included his villa in Torre del Lago, and took his name. The remainder of the estate remained in possession of its original heirs, who were not related to the Puccini family.

Another claimed heir, Nadia Manfredi, believed her father Antonio to be Puccini's illegitimate son, but her case was not proven, and was opposed by Simonetta.

== Dedication to composer's memory ==
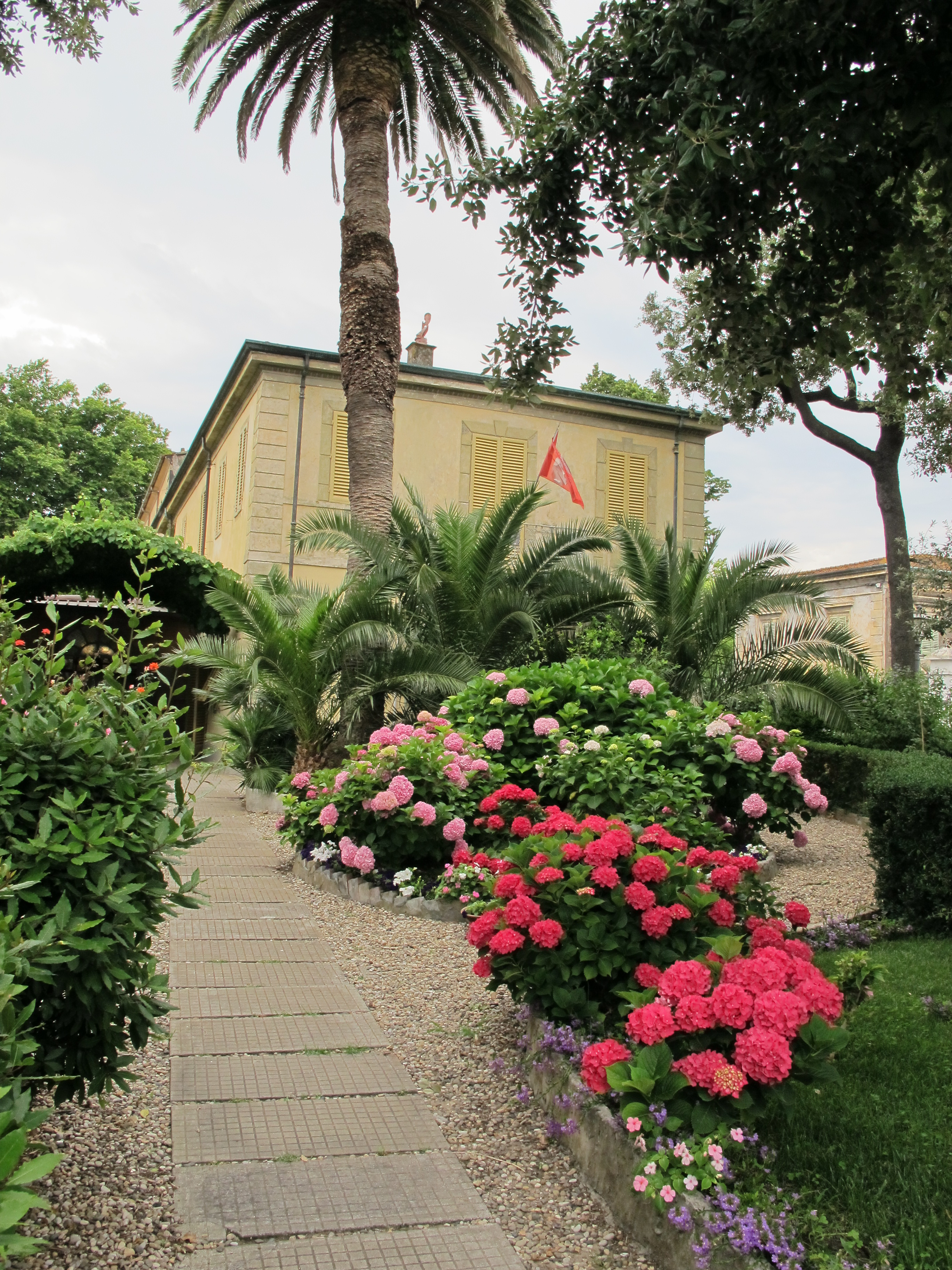
Villa Puccini in Torre del Lago Puccini

After taking ownership of the Villa Puccini, she established a non-profit "Friends of the Homes of Giacomo Puccini" to restore and maintain it. She established the Puccini Foundation in 2005 to help restore the home to appear still inhabited, and to promote other causes associated with the composer. By 2016, she had also opened the composer's rooms to the public.

She was also known for attending performances and exhibitions associated with the composer around the world. According to a statement on her death by the Fondazione Simonetta Puccini, she "dedicated her life with passion and devotion to the memory, protection and enhancement of the image of her grandfather and the places he loved".

== Bibliography ==
Among works written or co-written by Simonetta Puccini are:

- Weaver, William; Puccini, Simonetta (1994). The Puccini Companion. New York: W. W. Norton. ISBN 978-0-393-32052-7.
