= Carlo Lenci =

Italian footballer (1928-2000)

Personal information
- Date of birth: 15 July 1928
- Place of birth: Viareggio, Italy
- Date of death: 12 June 2000 (aged 71)
- Place of death: Florence, Italy
- Position: Midfielder

Senior career*
Years	Team	Apps	(Gls)
1946–1947	Forte dei Marmi		
1947–1948	Juventus	4	(1)
1948–1949	Legnano	28	(8)
1949–1950	Lucchese	19	(5)
1950–1951	Cremonese	34	(9)
1951–1952	Pisa	36	(2)
1952–1953	Monza	20	(4)
1953–1954	Empoli	12	(2)
1954–1956	Lecce	53	(14)
1956–1957	Arezzo	39	(23)
- * Club domestic league appearances and goals

Carlo Lenci (15 July 1928 – 12 June 2000) was an Italian professional footballer who played as a midfielder in the 1940s and 1950s. He made 23 appearances in Serie A playing for Juventus and Lucchese as well as 118 appearances in Serie B for Legnano, Cremonese, Pisa and Monza.
