= Viareggio =

- Comune
- Città di Viareggio
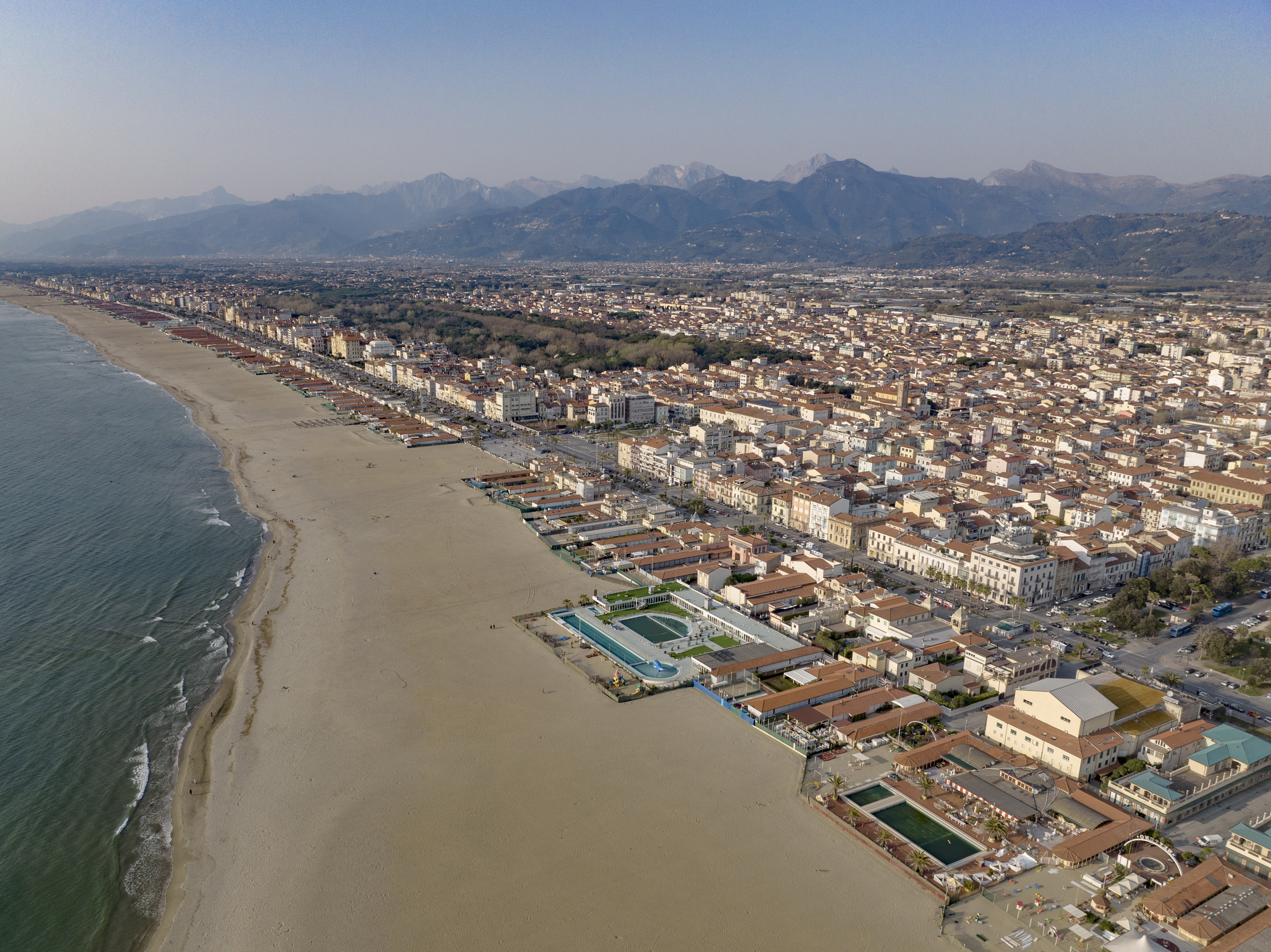
- Aerial view of Viareggio (2022)

- Coat of arms

- Location within Tuscany Location within Italy
- Coordinates: 43°52′N 10°14′E
- Country: Italy
- Region: Tuscany
- Province: Lucca
- Frazioni: Torre del Lago Puccini

Government
  - Mayor: Giorgio Del Ghingaro

Area
  - Total: 32.42 km^{2} (12.52 sq mi)
- Elevation: 2 m (6.6 ft)

Population (2025)
  - Total: 60,697
  - Density: 1,872/km^{2} (4,849/sq mi)
- Demonym(s): Viareggini, Torrelaghesi
- Time zone: UTC+1 (CET)
  - Summer (DST): UTC+2 (CEST)
- Postal code: 55049, 55048
- Dialing code: 0584
- Patron saint: Maria Santissima Annunziata
- Saint day: March 25
- Website: Official website

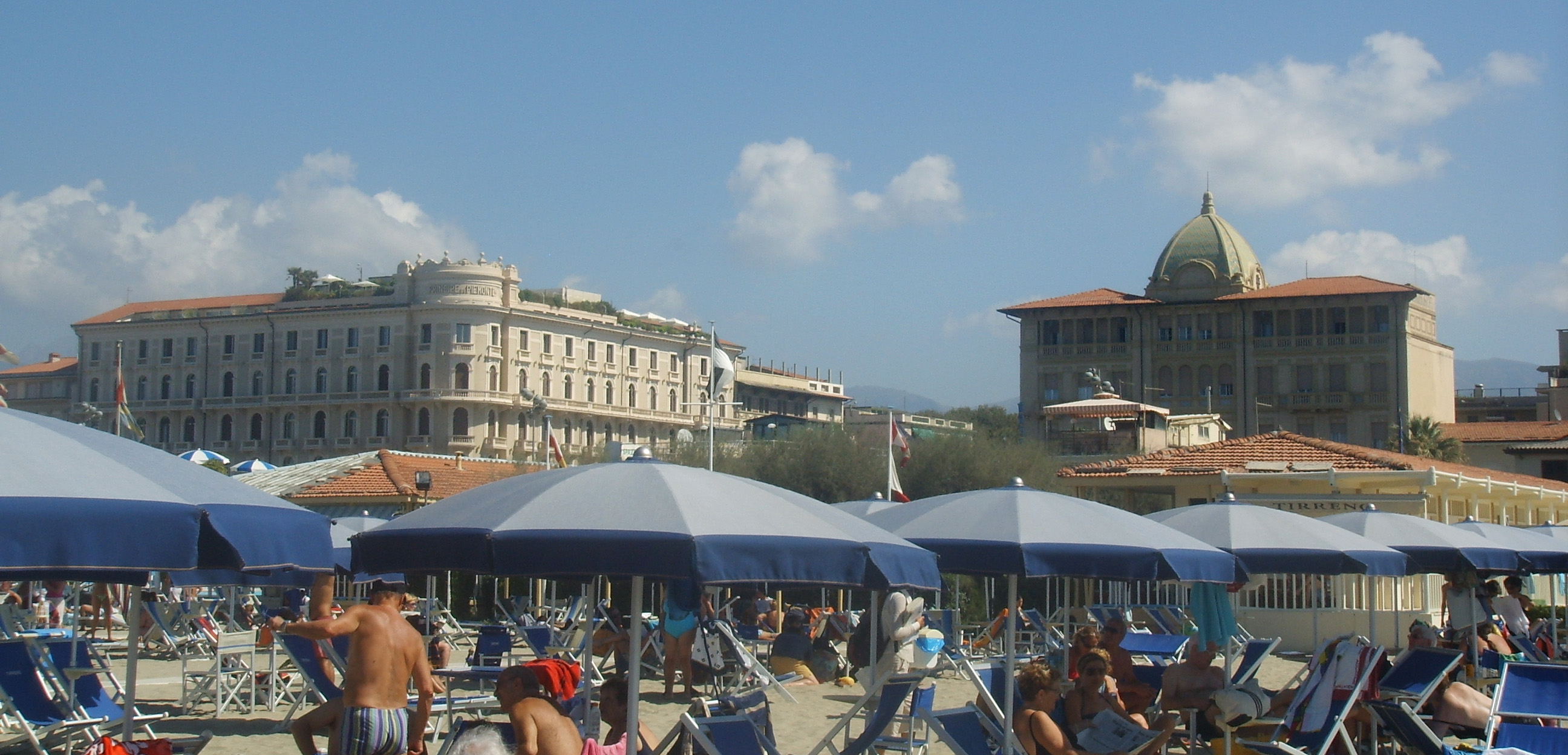
The Excelsior (right) and Principe di Piemonte (left) Hotels.

Viareggio (Italian pronunciation: [vjaˈreddʒo; vi.aˈreddʒo]) is a city and comune in northern Tuscany, Italy, on the coast of the Ligurian Sea. With a population of over 62,000, it is the second largest city in the province of Lucca, after Lucca.

It is known as a seaside resort as well as being the home of the famous carnival of Viareggio (dating back to 1873), and its papier-mâché floats, which (since 1925), parade along the promenade known as "Passeggiata a mare", in the weeks of Carnival. The symbol of the carnival of Viareggio and its official mask is Burlamacco, designed and invented by Uberto Bonetti in 1930.

The city traces its roots back to the first half of the 16th century when it became the only sea port for the Republic of Lucca. The oldest building in Viareggio, known as Torre Matilde, dates back to this time and was built by the Lucchesi in 1541 as a defensive fortification to fight the constant menace of corsair incursions.

Viareggio is also an active industrial and manufacturing centre; its shipbuilding industry has long been renowned around the world and its fishing and floricultural industries are still fundamental sectors to the city's economy.

Viareggio hosts the Premio letterario Viareggio Répaci for literature, established in 1929. Amongst the other events organized around the year, is the Festival Gaber, which has been held every August since 2004 to celebrate the memory of Giorgio Gaber, and is attended by several high-profile Italian musicians.

== History ==
=== Coat of arms ===
The current coat of arms was chosen in 1848 and replaces the previous one dating back to 1752, which showed an image of Saint Anthony from Padua, the first patron saint of the city.

The current coat of arms consists of an anchor with a hawser placed on top of a white, red and green shield. Viareggio was one of the first municipalities to adopt the tricolore (later to become the official flag of the unified Italy) for its coat of arm; even before Italy was officially unified.

=== Ancient and medieval ages ===
During the 3rd century BC, the mountains of Versilia were slowly invaded by the Ligurian tribes who, coming from the north, stretched their area of influence as far south as the river Arno. In 180 BC the Romans defeated the Ligurians and started colonising the Versilia (the areas known today as Massaciuccoli, Camaiore, Pietrasanta).

The most widely accepted theory recognises the city's name as deriving from the Latin Via Regis ("Kings' Road"), the name of the Medieval road linking the fortification built on the beach to Lucca.

According to other historians, instead, the name derives from Vicus Regius. This theory is based on the fact that in imperial times, there was a small inhabited centre (vicus) in the area known as "Gli Ortacci" which belonged to the empire, hence regius ("Royal").

Several hillside towns started developing in the Middle Ages, some of which are still active. The area currently hosting the city of Viareggio was still marshland and not inhabited. Around 1000 A.D. the first hostilities between Lucca and Pisa arose, aimed at gaining control over the coast of the Versila, which since the High Middle Ages had been nothing more than a forest owned by feudal lords in constant rivalry with each other.

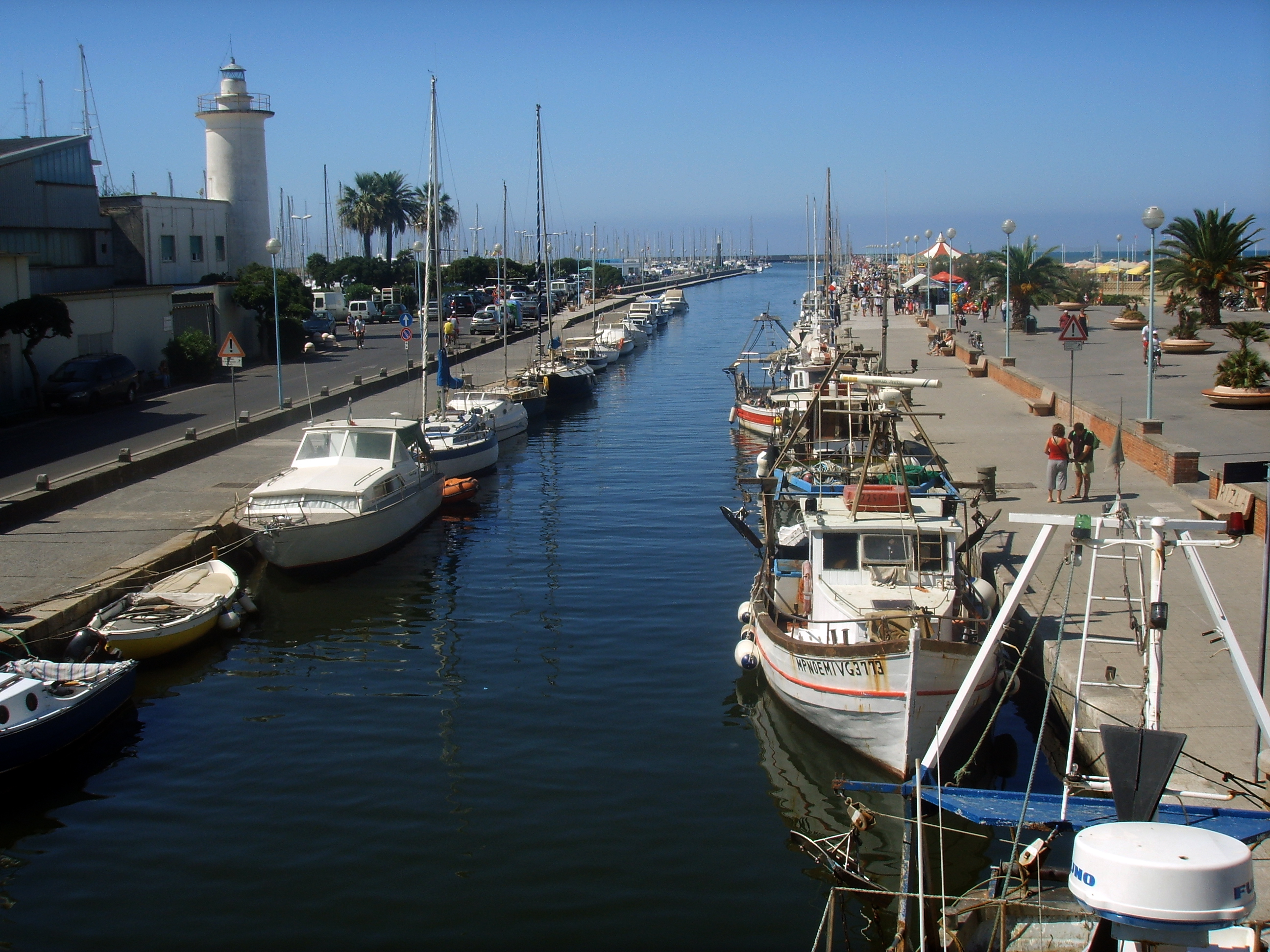
The Burlamacca canal and the old lighthouse.

The first mention of Viareggio dates back to 1169 when a wooden tower guarding the coast was built. A little over two years later, in (1172) a military building named Turris de Via Regia was erected, taking its name from the road that linked it to Lucca (known today as via Montramito). In the following years the area around Viareggio, was involved in the hostilities between Pisa and Lucca, in their attempt to gain control over the coastal area. The conflict was spurred by the desire of the Lucchesi to finally gain access to the sea, and to the Pisane fear of the economic competition of its rival city. It is during these years that the feudal Lords of Versilia were forced to abdicate in favour of Castruccio Castracani. In the following years the area upon which Viareggio would eventually be built was marked by a number of minor battles, invasions and pillages. In addition, the area was also affected by the pestilence which, recounted by Giovanni Boccaccio in his masterpiece the Decameron, spread throughout the whole of Italy.

=== 15th through 17th centuries ===
In these years Florence expanded its control over Tuscany. Lucca, however, managed to maintain its independence in exchange for hefty financial penalties.

On 10 September 1513 Pope Leo X removed the port of Motrone from the control of Lucca. This directly affected the future of Viareggio which, from that moment, became the focus of Lucca's efforts to turn the town into its centre for commercial activities, and, in addition to the square-plan tower erected in (1534) with the aim to protect the port, several settlements started appearing.

The 17th century was perhaps one of the most difficult periods for the 300 inhabitants of Viareggio; the area was insalubrious, malaria and other deadly epidemic diseases made the lives of fishermen and farmers extremely difficult. Lucca, on the other hand, increased its efforts to drain the marshlands to improve quality of life and encouraged migration to the new town.

Slowly Viareggio changed its appearance; two small churches and as many factories were built, followed by a number of small shops. Meanwhile its port became more active, while the cultivation of the drained fields started.

=== 18th and 19th centuries ===
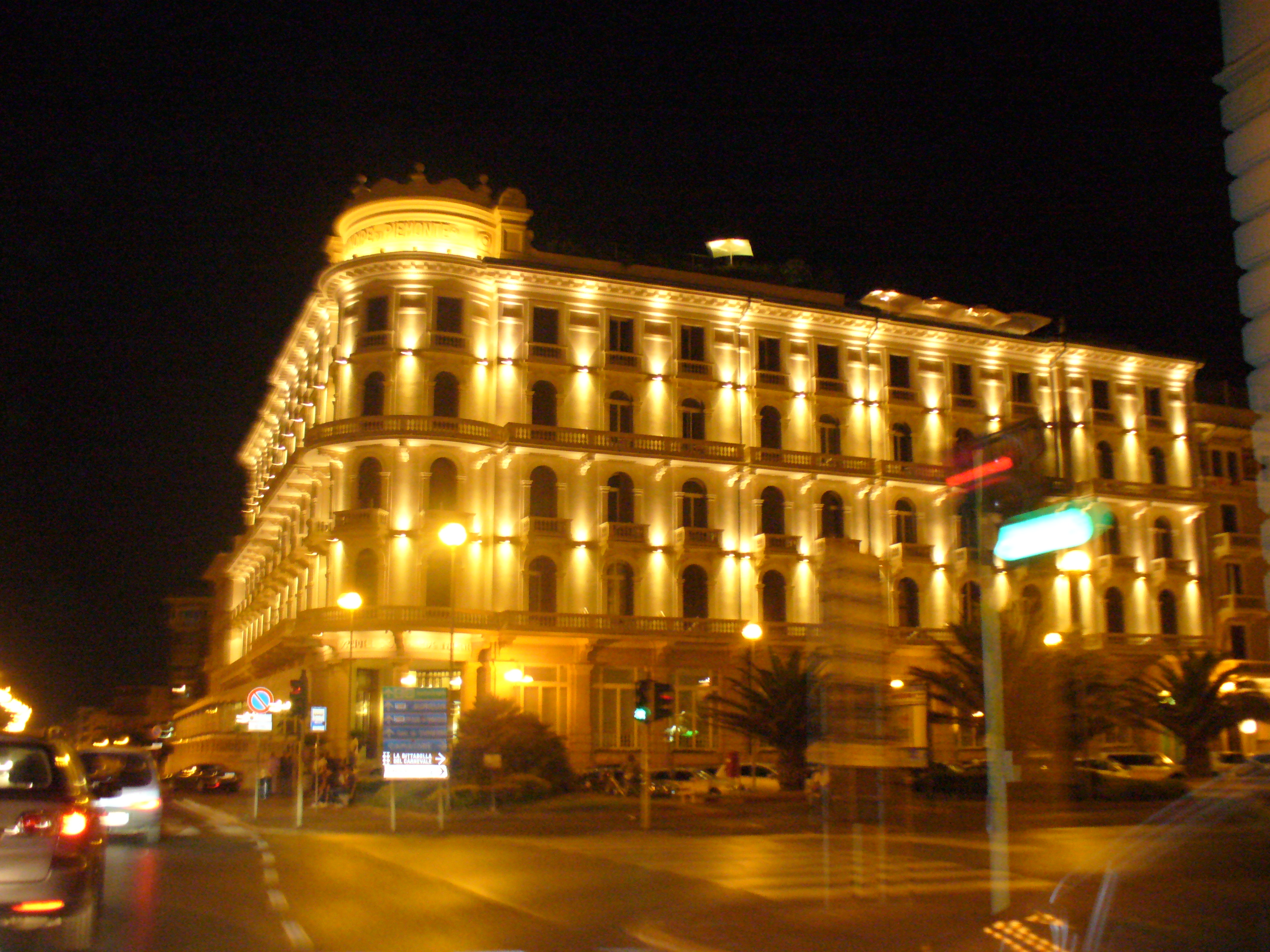
Principe di Piemonte Hotel.

In 1701 Viareggio became a comune (municipality). In 1739, thanks to the work of hydraulics engineer Bernardino Zendrini, the marshlands were finally completely drained and the town turned into a place where noblemen from Lucca came and built their palaces.

In May 1799 Viareggio was the centre of a popular uprising against the Jacobin Club.

With the invasion of Italy by Napoleon the Lucchese state was turned into a principality whose sovereignty was given to Felice Baciocchi, although the real power was in the hands of Napoleon's older sister, Elisa. Elisa's government was characterised by unpopular measures such as those against the ecclesiastic patrimony. Similarly, most of her financial policies were of dubious effect, although some were welcomed by the locals, such as the adoption of the "Napoleonic Code," the adoption of the metric system, and the introduction of mandatory vaccination against smallpox.

With the fall of Napoleon and Baciocchi, Viareggio was the centre of several acts of violence. In March 1814 the population openly protested against the French, an event which turned into acts of pure vandalism.

Viareggio remained under the control of the Austrians until 1817 when, as part of the agreements from Congress of Vienna, Maria Luisa of Spain was assigned the new Duchy of Lucca. The years to come would wipe out any good action that had been taken during the Napoleonic rule, although the new ruler would contribute to the town's expansion by building its first marina (seaside). In 1820 Viareggio obtained the status of city.

Following the death of his mother (13 March 1824), Charles Louis of Parma took over the government of Lucca and greatly contributed to Viareggio's expansion, by building a new church, a royal casino and two beach resorts, the first ones to be built in Viareggio.

On 5 October 1847, Lucca was acquired by the Grand Duchy of Tuscany. Viareggio, in this new scenario, developed as a seaside resort for the whole of Tuscany. In 1848 the city adopted its current coat of arms. In these years Viareggio was the destination of many exiled intellectuals of the Italian Risorgimento who were tolerated by the local sovereigns.

During these years Viareggio's economy saw a very rapid expansion through its already recognised beach tourism and the newly expanding sailboat industry. Its population increased from 300 in 1740 to 6,549 in 1841.

=== 20th century ===
The beginning of the 20th century saw again a marked development of the coast and tourism industry, which caused a drastic change to most of the beach. The Passeggiata or promenade was born, with its cafés and shops, contributing to turning the city into the "Pearl of the Tyrrhenian Sea." Wood was very widely used in most buildings, and in 1917, a large portion of the city was lost in fire in only one night. It was only during the fascist era that wood would finally be replaced by other materials.

During World War II Viareggio was subject to heavy bombings and entire suburbs of the city were destroyed.

After the war, the reconstruction finally began, but the city's appearance had changed dramatically. Today Viareggio is still a renowned seaside resort and is widely famous for its carnival and shipbuilding industry.

=== 21st century ===
Late in the evening of 29 June 2009, a train carrying liquified petroleum gas derailed while approaching Viareggio's railway station. The ensuing explosion killed 32 people, injured many others, and destroyed a large number of homes and families near the station.

== Geography ==
The entire area of Viareggio extends over the coastal flooding plain of Versilia. Located on the Ligurian Sea (although traditionally considered to face the Tyrrhenian Sea), it has 10 kilometres (6.2 mi) of sandy beaches, of which 6 kilometres (3.7 mi) are managed by private beach resorts and the remaining 4 kilometres (2.5 mi) are public (most of the public beach is part of the Parco Naturale Regionale Migliarino-San Rossore-Massaciuccoli. Viareggio borders the local municipalities of Camaiore, Massarosa and Vecchiano) (PI).

The municipal area comprises the Lake of Massaciuccoli and several canals, the most important ones of which are known as Burlamacca, Farabola, Fossa dell'Abate (bordering the municipality of Camaiore), and Fosso Le Quindici.

=== Subdivisions ===
Viareggio has a single frazione, Torre del Lago Puccini, having a population of around 11,000.

The city itself was subdivided into four Circoscrizioni, till 2010:

- Circoscrizione no. 1: Torre del Lago Puccini.
- Circoscrizione no. 2: Centro Marco Polo.
- Circoscrizione no. 3: Darsena/ex Campo d'Aviazione.
- Circoscrizione no. 4: Viareggio Nuova.

=== Climate ===
The climate is characterised by high levels of humidity (between 60% and 80% of relative humidity in the summer months) and a yearly rainfall of 700 to 1,000 millimetres (28 to 39 in) as a result of the proximity of the Apuanian Alps to the coast.

The main winds blow from the southeast: the Libeccio and the Ponente, which batter the coast for two to three days in a row, cause severe storms.

During winter months (Dec-Feb), high temperatures can vary between 14–15 °C (57–59 °F) and 4–5 °C (39–41 °F), while night time temperatures can reach below 0 °C (32 °F) on average 24 times a year. In the summer (Jun-Aug), temperatures peak around 31–33 °C (88–91 °F), with the highest temperature of the year being around 35 °C (95 °F).

- Climatic classification: zone D, 1416 GR/G
- Atmospheric diffusivity: low, Ibimet CNR 2002

Climate data for Pisa ITA, 1991–2020, Extremes 1973-
Month	Jan	Feb	Mar	Apr	May	Jun	Jul	Aug	Sep	Oct	Nov	Dec	Year
Record high °C (°F)	18.0 (64.4)	21.0 (69.8)	24.5 (76.1)	28.0 (82.4)	34.4 (93.9)	37.6 (99.7)	39.0 (102.2)	38.5 (101.3)	36.0 (96.8)	30.2 (86.4)	24.0 (75.2)	20.4 (68.7)	39.0 (102.2)
Mean daily maximum °C (°F)	11.5 (52.7)	12.6 (54.7)	15.6 (60.1)	18.6 (65.5)	22.7 (72.9)	27.1 (80.8)	29.9 (85.8)	30.4 (86.7)	26.1 (79.0)	21.4 (70.5)	16.1 (61.0)	12.2 (54.0)	20.4 (68.7)
Daily mean °C (°F)	7.7 (45.9)	7.7 (45.9)	10.5 (50.9)	13.3 (55.9)	17.1 (62.8)	21.3 (70.3)	24.0 (75.2)	24.4 (75.9)	20.5 (68.9)	16.6 (61.9)	12.0 (53.6)	8.0 (46.4)	15.3 (59.5)
Mean daily minimum °C (°F)	2.6 (36.7)	2.8 (37.0)	5.4 (41.7)	8.0 (46.4)	11.6 (52.9)	15.5 (59.9)	18.1 (64.6)	18.5 (65.3)	14.9 (58.8)	11.8 (53.2)	7.8 (46.0)	3.8 (38.8)	10.2 (50.4)
Record low °C (°F)	−17.0 (1.4)	−8.0 (17.6)	−8.0 (17.6)	−3.0 (26.6)	2.0 (35.6)	4.0 (39.2)	9.0 (48.2)	8.0 (46.4)	5.0 (41.0)	0.8 (33.4)	−9.6 (14.7)	−10.4 (13.3)	−17.0 (1.4)
Average rainfall mm (inches)	58.30 (2.30)	57.01 (2.24)	61.63 (2.43)	48.71 (1.92)	55.64 (2.19)	34.36 (1.35)	26.82 (1.06)	34.39 (1.35)	83.16 (3.27)	104.81 (4.13)	114.54 (4.51)	76.95 (3.03)	756.34 (29.78)
Average relative humidity (%)	77.4	73.6	72.5	73.9	74.0	71.7	69.2	70.5	73.3	77.6	79.3	78.8	74.3
Source 1: Il Meteo Humidity.
Source 2: MeteoStat All temperatures and rainfall.

== Demographics ==
Historical population

Year	Pop.	±%
1861	8,765	—
1871	12,249	+39.7%
1881	14,164	+15.6%
1901	17,240	+21.7%
1911	21,410	+24.2%
1921	27,739	+29.6%
1931	32,452	+17.0%
1936	35,594	+9.7%

Year	Pop.	±%
1951	41,764	+17.3%
1961	47,323	+13.3%
1971	55,737	+17.8%
1981	58,263	+4.5%
1991	57,514	−1.3%
2001	61,103	+6.2%
2011	61,857	+1.2%
2021	61,045	−1.3%

Source: ISTAT

== Economy ==
The primary sectors of Viareggio's economy are tourism, commerce and services, include fishing and floriculture (the flowers of Versilia).

The city also houses shipyards.

At the beginning of the 19th century, craftsmen from Viareggio built small fishing vessels along the banks of the Burlamacca canal. As the century progressed, however, this small shipbuilding activity prospered until it became an internationally acclaimed centre. Nowadays, Viareggio is the main luxury yachts producing city in the world thanks to the presence of shipyards with builders such as Azimut Benetti, Codecasa, Fipa, Rossinavi, Perini navi and many others.

== Culture ==
=== Carnival ===
The Carnival of Viareggio was established in 1873, while the now ever-present papier mâché – used to build the floats featured during its parades – was first introduced in 1925. The official masks of the Carnival are Burlamacco and Ondina, drawn for the first time in 1930.

Since 1954, RAI broadcasts the entire event on national TV. Since 2001, the craftsmen of the carnival have moved to the Cittadella del Carnevale or, literally, Carnival Town.

=== Prizes ===
- Premio letterario Viareggio Repaci, a literary award founded in 1929 by Leonida Rèpaci, Alberto Colantuoni and Carlo Salsa.
- Premio internazionale Artiglio.
- Premio Sport Città di Viareggio.
- Premio Viareggio Sport.

=== Events ===
- The Festival Puccini (held in Torre del Lago Puccini) takes place every summer since 1930, between July and August, in an open-air theatre with 3,200 seats on the shore of lake Massaciuccoli. A new permanent theatre was opened in 2009.
- Jazz and more..., music festival held since 2002
- Festival teatro canzone – Giorgio Gaber, since 2004
- Viareggio Incontri, at "Il Principino", on the Promenade.
- EuropaCinema, an international film festival reserved to the European film industry. It was founded in 1984 in Rimini, then moved to Bari in 1988, and finally to Viareggio in 1989.
- The Torneo Mondiale Giovanile di Calcio "Coppa Carnevale" is one of the most prestigious youth football tournaments, with competing youth teams from clubs around the world.

== Main sights ==
- Villa Orlando
- Villa Borbone (between Viareggio and Torre del Lago Puccini).
- Villa Puccini, Museum.
- Monument to the Resistance and to Peace, (largo Risorgimento). The monument is made of columns taken from the old City Hall, destroyed by the aerial bombardments of World War II, and two walls running perpendicular to each other. On one of these a mosaic from Jean-Michel Folon can be found together with a quote from Quasimodo: "E come potevamo noi cantare con i piedi stranieri sopra il cuore?"/"And how could we sing with foreign feet trampling onto our hearts?"

== Sport ==
The city is home of the roller hockey team CGC Viareggio. CGC Viareggio was the first club of Lucca province to be champion, in Italian sport. In 2011, they won the Serie A1 italian hockey title.

The association football team is F.C. Esperia Viareggio.

It also has its own professional beach soccer team Viareggio Beach Soccer.

== Transportation ==
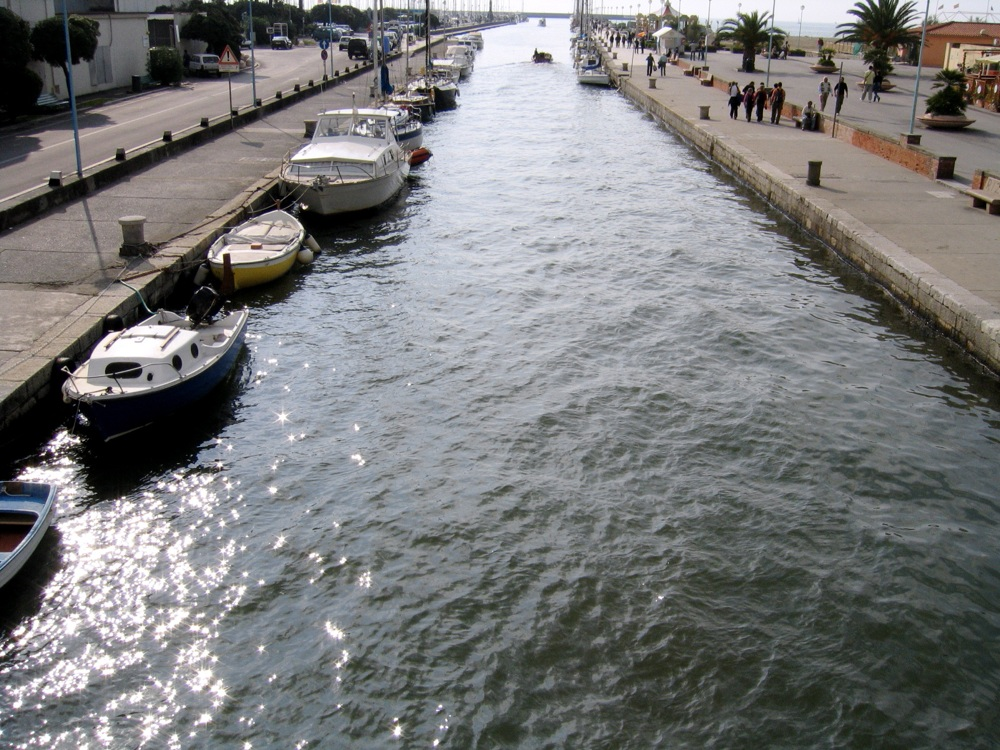
The pier and the Burlamacca's canal.

=== Motorway ===
Viareggio is connected to Autostrada A11 from Florence via A11/"Bretella" Lucca-Viareggio and to Autostrada A12 linking Genoa-Rosignano.

=== Train ===
Viareggio railway station is located near the city center, with 60 daily trains running along the Rome–Pisa–La Spezia–Genoa line, and the line to Florence, as well as international trains.

=== Airport ===
The nearest airport is Pisa's "Galileo Galilei" international airport, just 20 kilometres (12 mi) south of Viareggio's city center. Florence's "Amerigo Vespucci" airport is 95 kilometres (59 mi) to the east.

=== Port and marina ===
Two extensions to today's Burlamacca canal were built in 1577. It was on its banks that the first maritime activities developed. In 1740, Bernardino Zendrini had a water-gate built in order to prevent the sea water from reaching lake Massaciuccoli. In 1820 Maria Luisa, duchess of Lucca, had the first marina of Viareggio built. It was completed in 1823 and took the name of Marina of Lucca. Between 1871 and 1873 the so-called Marina of Tuscany was built, followed by the Marina of Italy, from 1907 through to 1911. In 1938 the Marina of the Empire was also built, which was followed in the 1970s by the Marina of Viareggio (also known as the New Marina), the Marina of La Madonnina, and the new lighthouse. The Madonnina can host up to 500 vessels. The city hosts the local Capitaneria di Porto, and all vessels registered here bear the marking VG.

== Gallery ==
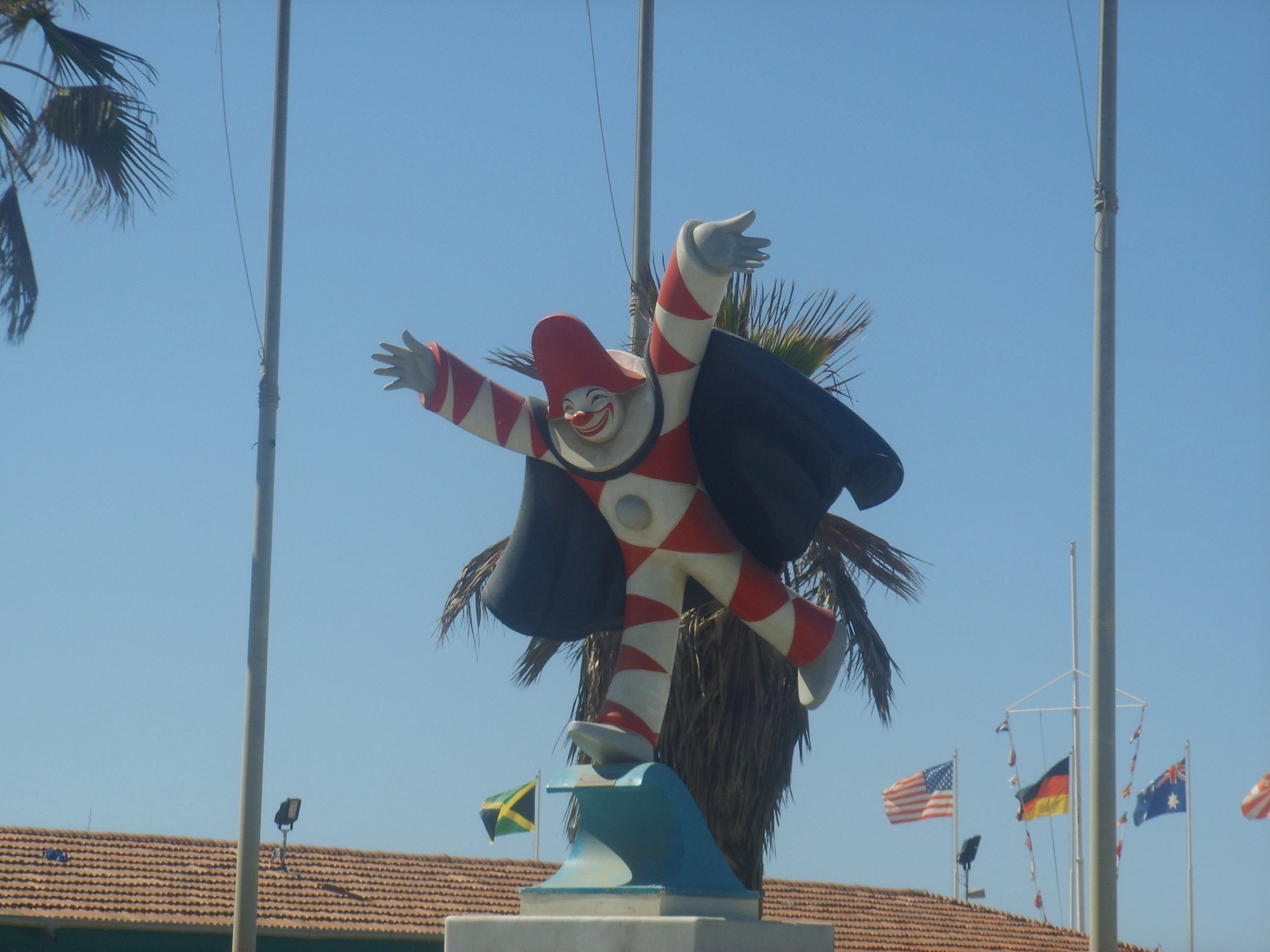
Statue of Burlamacco on Belvedere delle Maschere.

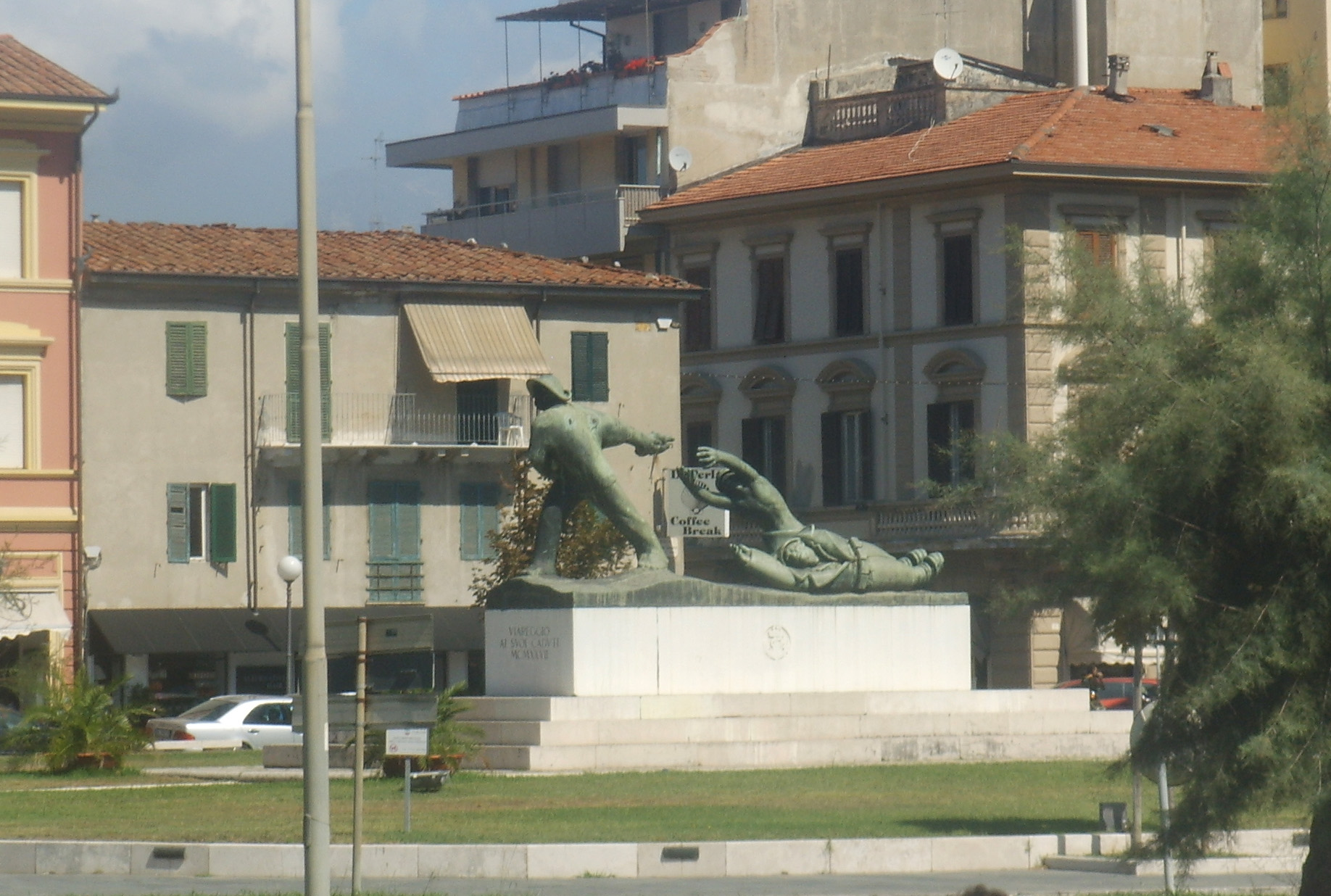
War Memorial in Piazza Garibaldi, known as "Piazza delle Paure".

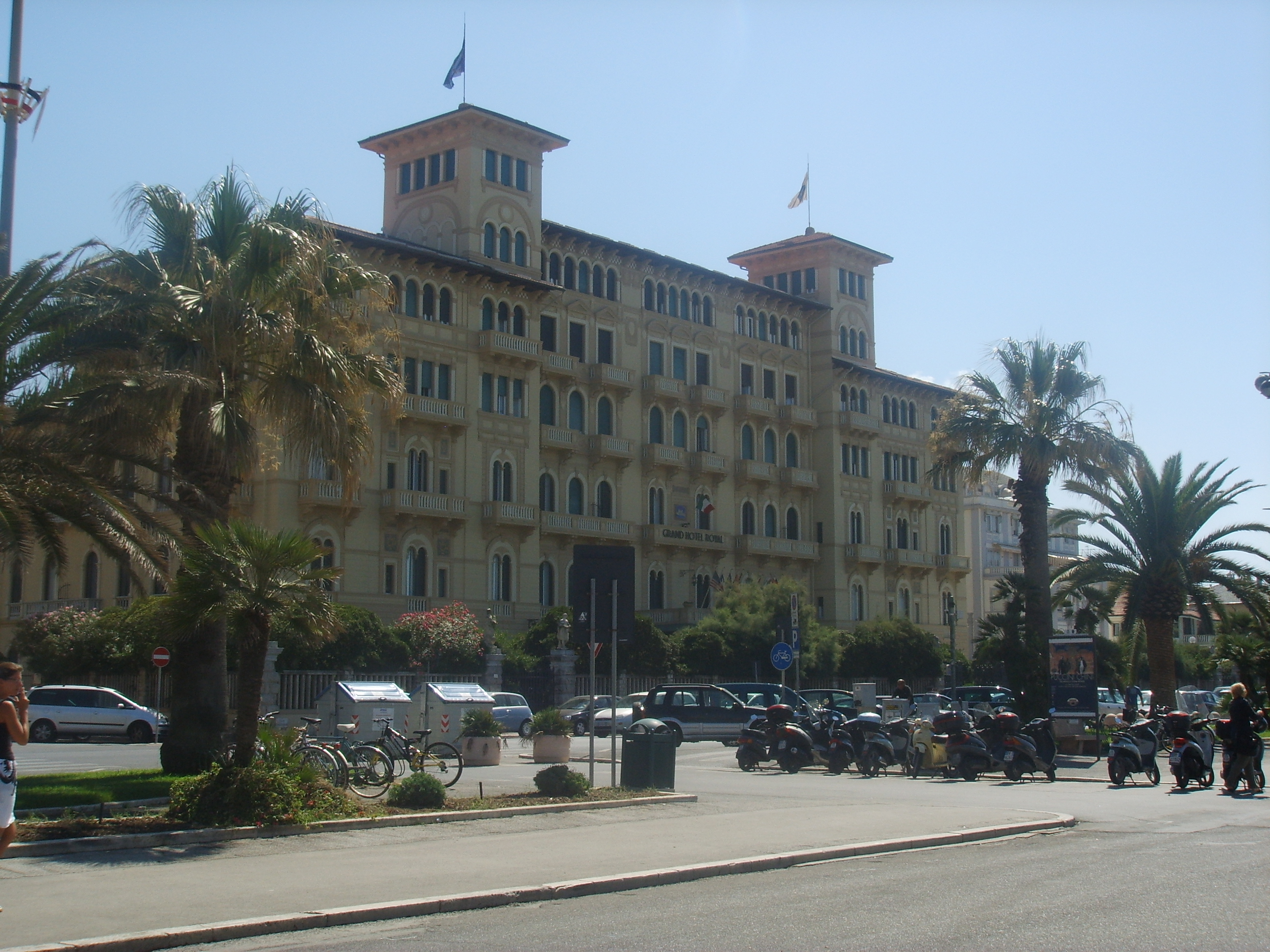
Grand Hotel.

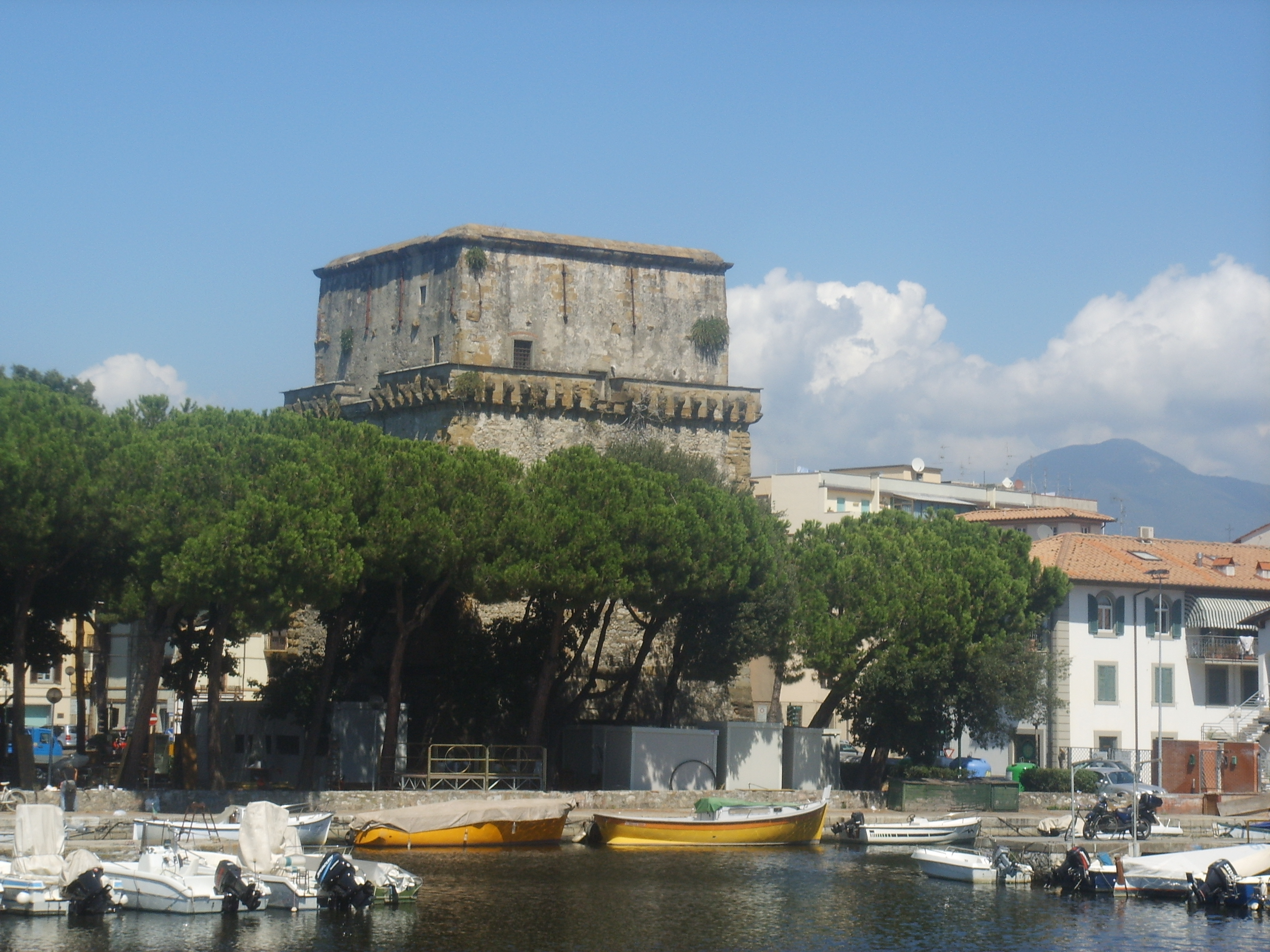
Torre Matilde and the Marina of Lucca.

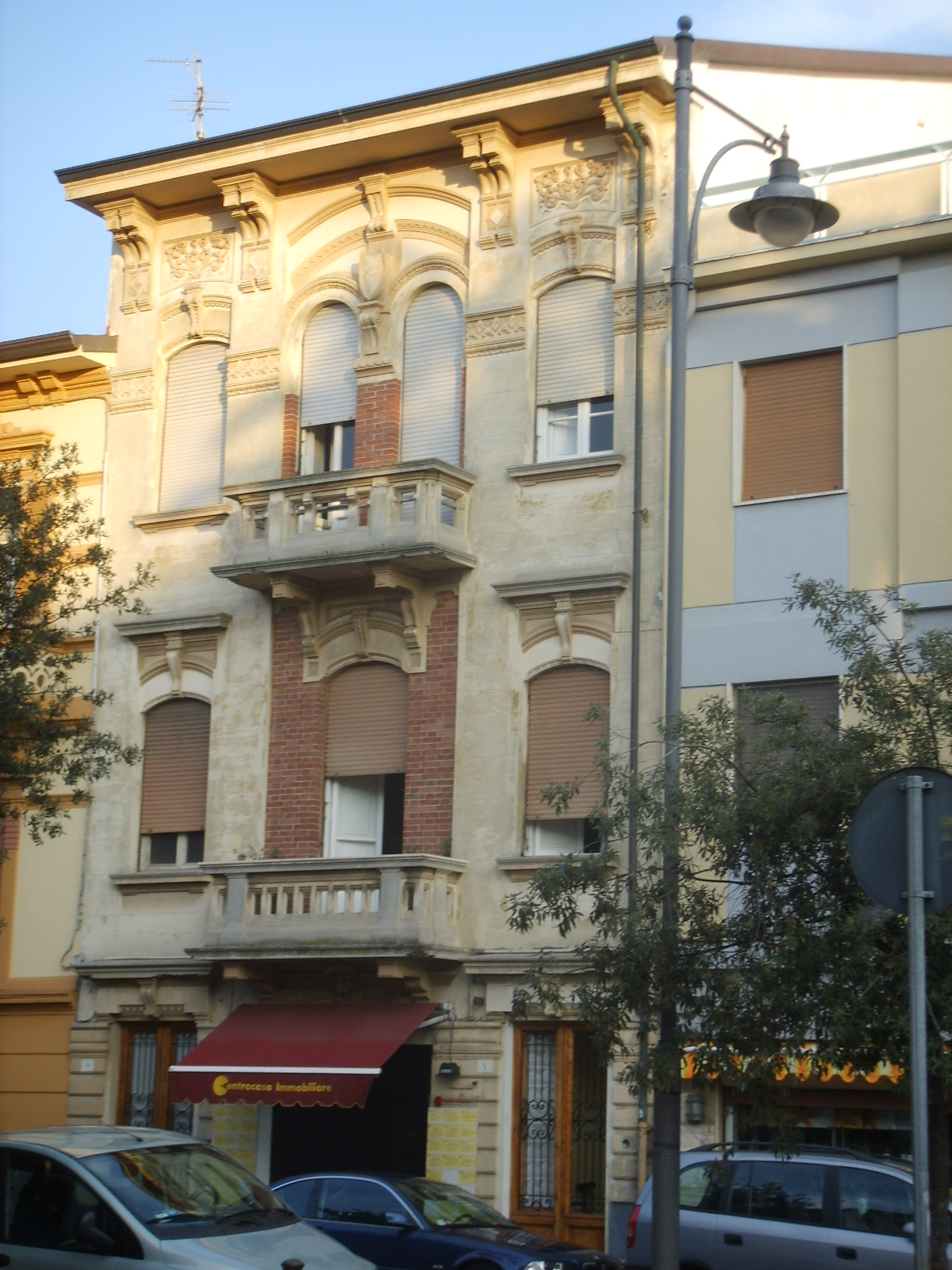
Liberty-style building.

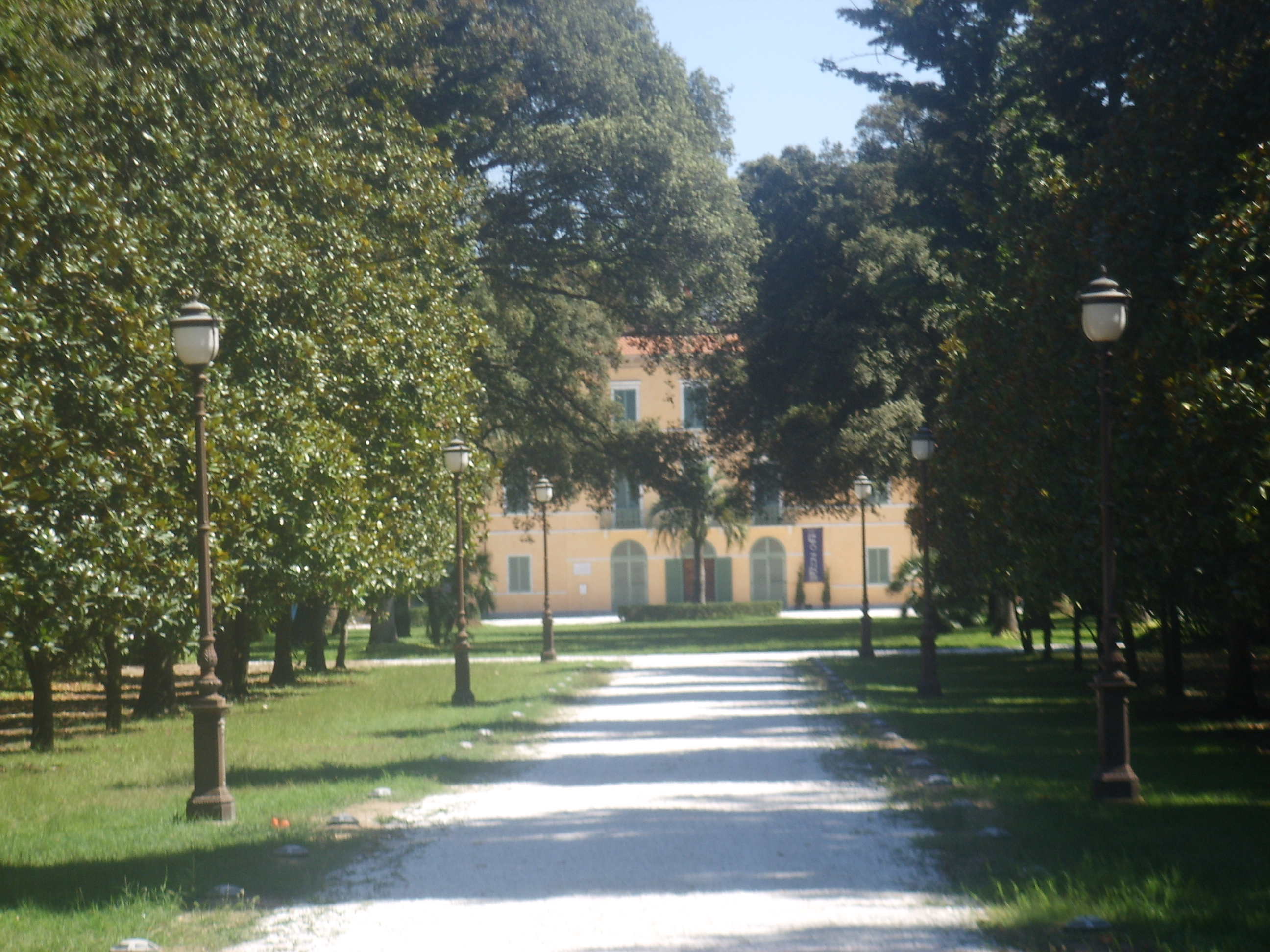
Villa Borbone, between Viareggio and Torre del Lago Puccini.

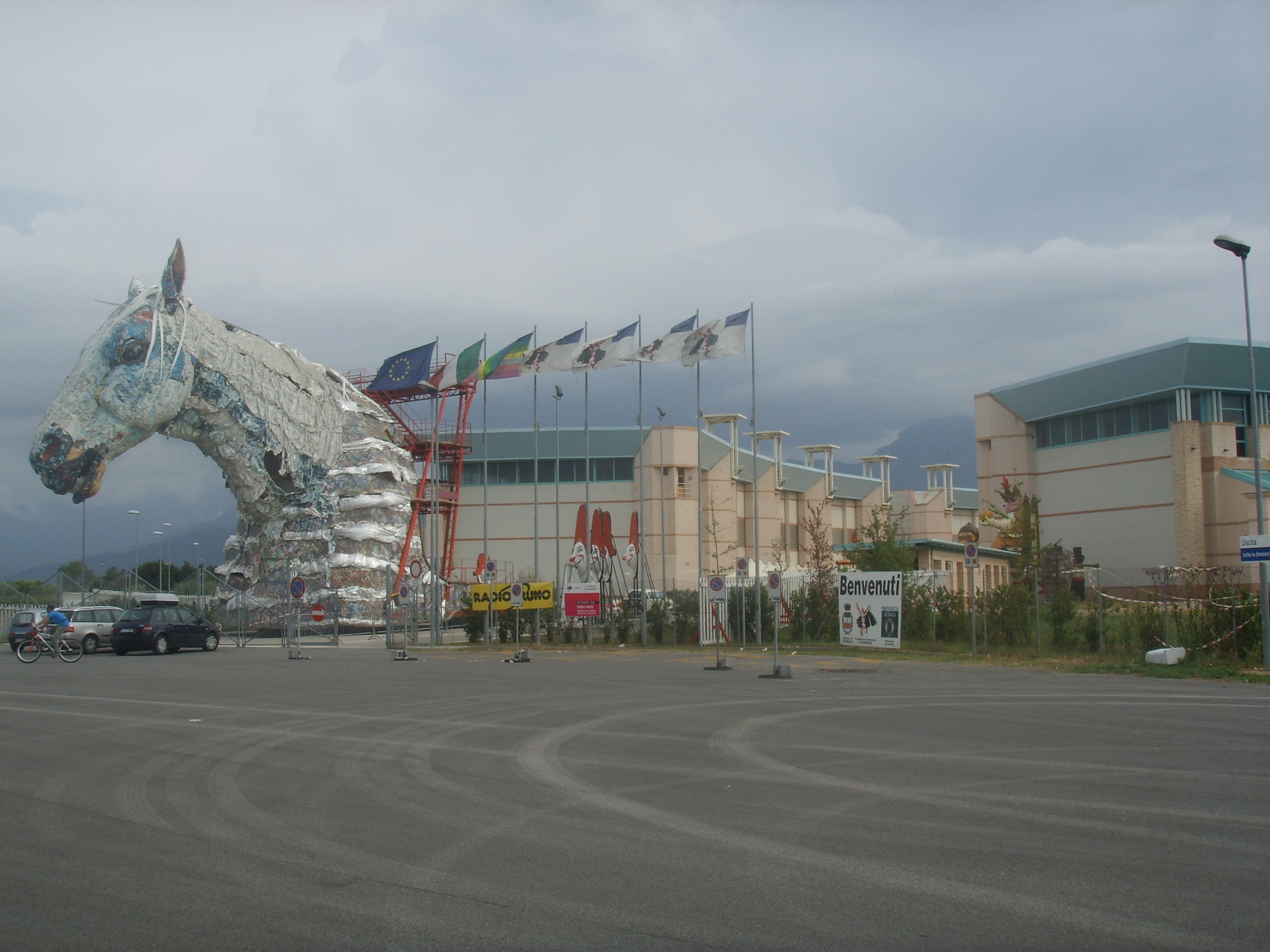
A float being towed out of the Cittadella del Carnevale.

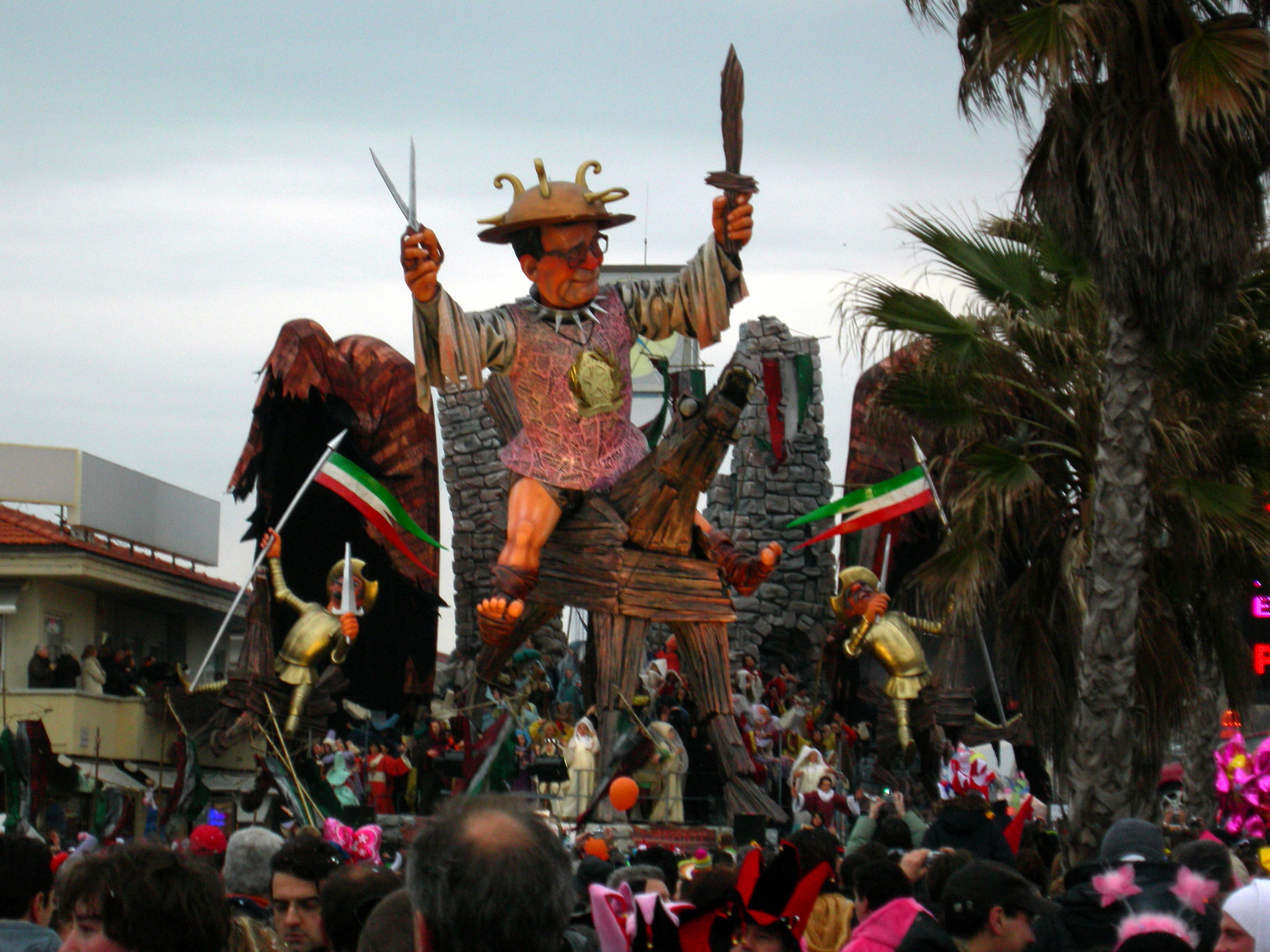
Carnival Float, 2007.

== International relations ==
Viareggio is twinned with:

- Bastia, France
- Shëngjin, Albania
- (United States) Bridgeport, US
- Kunshan, China
- Opole, Poland
- Palmi, Italy
- San Benedetto del Tronto, Italy
- Pasto, Colombia

== Notable people ==
- Princess Maria Antónia of Bragança was born here
- Inigo Campioni (1878–1944), soldier and politician
- Araldo Caprili (1920-1982), football player
- Pierluigi Collina, football referee
- Marco Columbro, presenter and actor
- Eleonora Duse, actress in [1913] lived in a little rose villa behind a vineyard at Fossa Dell' Abate
- Eugenio Fascetti, football manager
- Sir Francis Fletcher-Vane, 5th Baronet, lived in Viareggio
- Carlo Lenci (born 1928), football player
- Marcello Lippi, football manager
- Nicola Luisotti, orchestra director
- Renato Santini (1912–1995), painter
- Giorgio Michetti, painter and ultracentenarian
- Mario Monicelli, film director
- Giovanni Pacini (1796–1867), composer, lived in Viareggio
- André Puccinelli, governor of Mato Grosso do Sul in Brazil
- Stefania Sandrelli, actress
- Percy Bysshe Shelley (1792–1822), English poet and writer whose body was cremated here
- Mario Tobino (1910–1991), doctor, poet and writer
- Maria Valtorta, writer and mystic

== See also ==
- 2009 Viareggio derailment
- Carnival of Viareggio
- Festival Puccini
- Football Club Esperia Viareggio
- Premio letterario Viareggio Repaci

== Sources ==
=== History ===
- Bergamini, Francesco (1995). Le mille e una...notizia di vita viareggina 1169/1940. Viareggio: Pezzini Editore.
- Paolo Fornaciari (ed.). I quaderni del Centro Documentario Storico (Cenni di storia viareggina).
- __ (1994). I quaderni della torre. Viareggio: Pezzini Editore.
- Paolo Fornaciari (ed.). Quaderni di storia e cultura. Viareggio: Pezzini Editore.
- Del Carlo, Quinto. Ruggero Righini (ed.). L'antica magione...storia preromana di Viareggio e Versilia. Edizioni Dedalus.
- Bergamini, Francesco (2000). Viareggio e la sua Storia 1000–1800. Viareggio: Pezzini Editore.

=== Buildings ===
- Polleschi, Giorgio (1994). Le opere dell'ingegnere architetto Alfredo Belluomini. Viareggio: Edizioni della Fontana.
- Gravina, Luigi. Viareggio Illustrata. Viareggio: Arti Grafiche G. Pezzini.

=== Religion ===
- Menchini, C.; G. Pratesi (1996). La Basilica di Sant'Andrea di Viareggio. Viareggio: Grafiche L'ancora.
- __ G. Pratesi (1996). La Basilica di San Paolino. Viareggio: Grafiche L'ancora.
- __ G. Pratesi (2004). Luoghi ebraici in Toscana. Settimo Milanese: Grafiche Mazzucchelli.

=== Other ===
- Daniele Palchetti, ed. (2003). Viareggio. Milan: Idea Books.
- Isaliana Lazzerini, ed. (2003). D'incanto (attraverso Viareggio tra natura, storia, cultura e sogno). Florence: Maschietto Editore.
