= Torre del Lago =

Town in Italy

Coordinates: 43°49′39″N 10°17′22″E

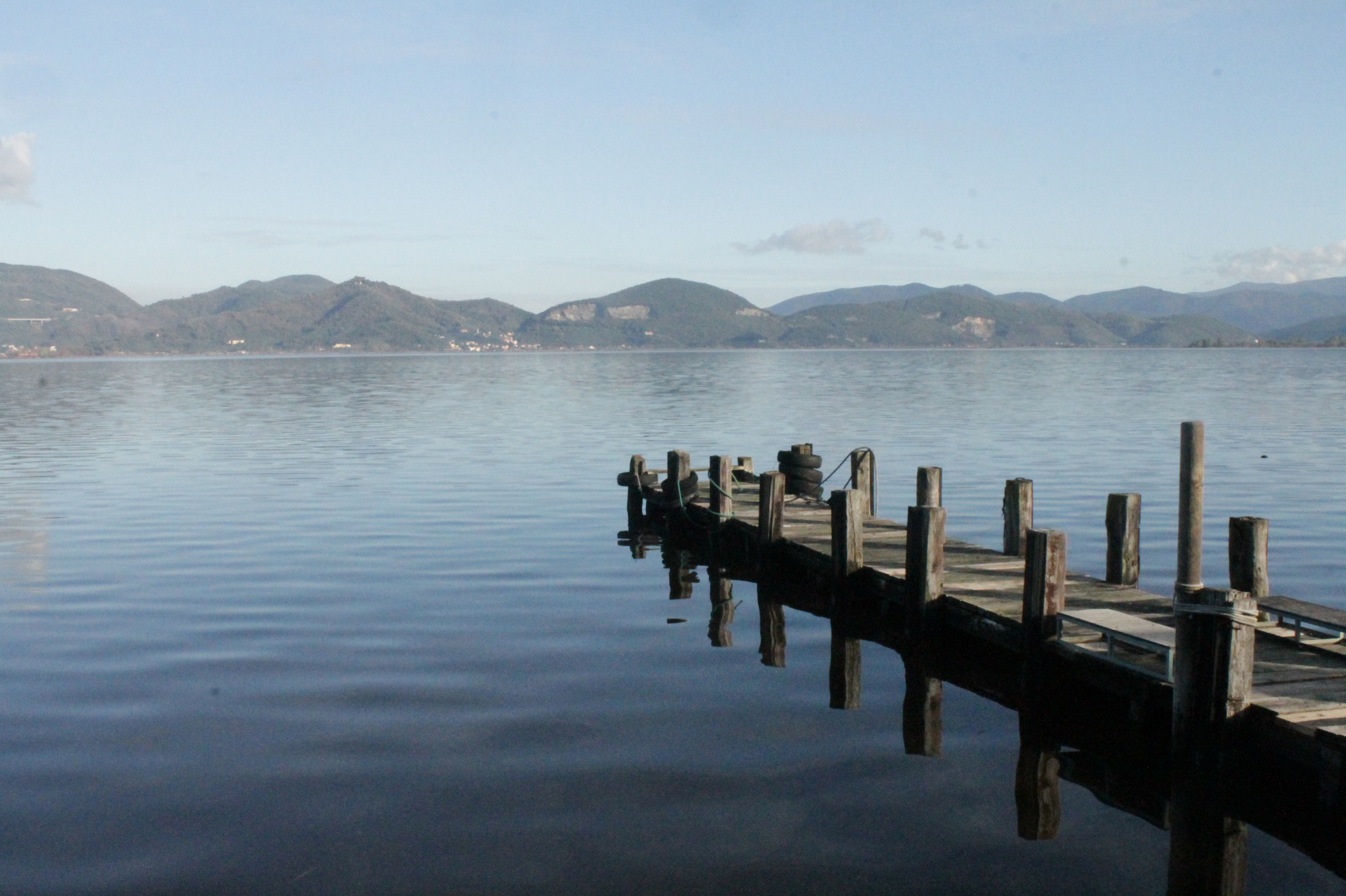
Lake Massaciuccoli from Torre del Lago.

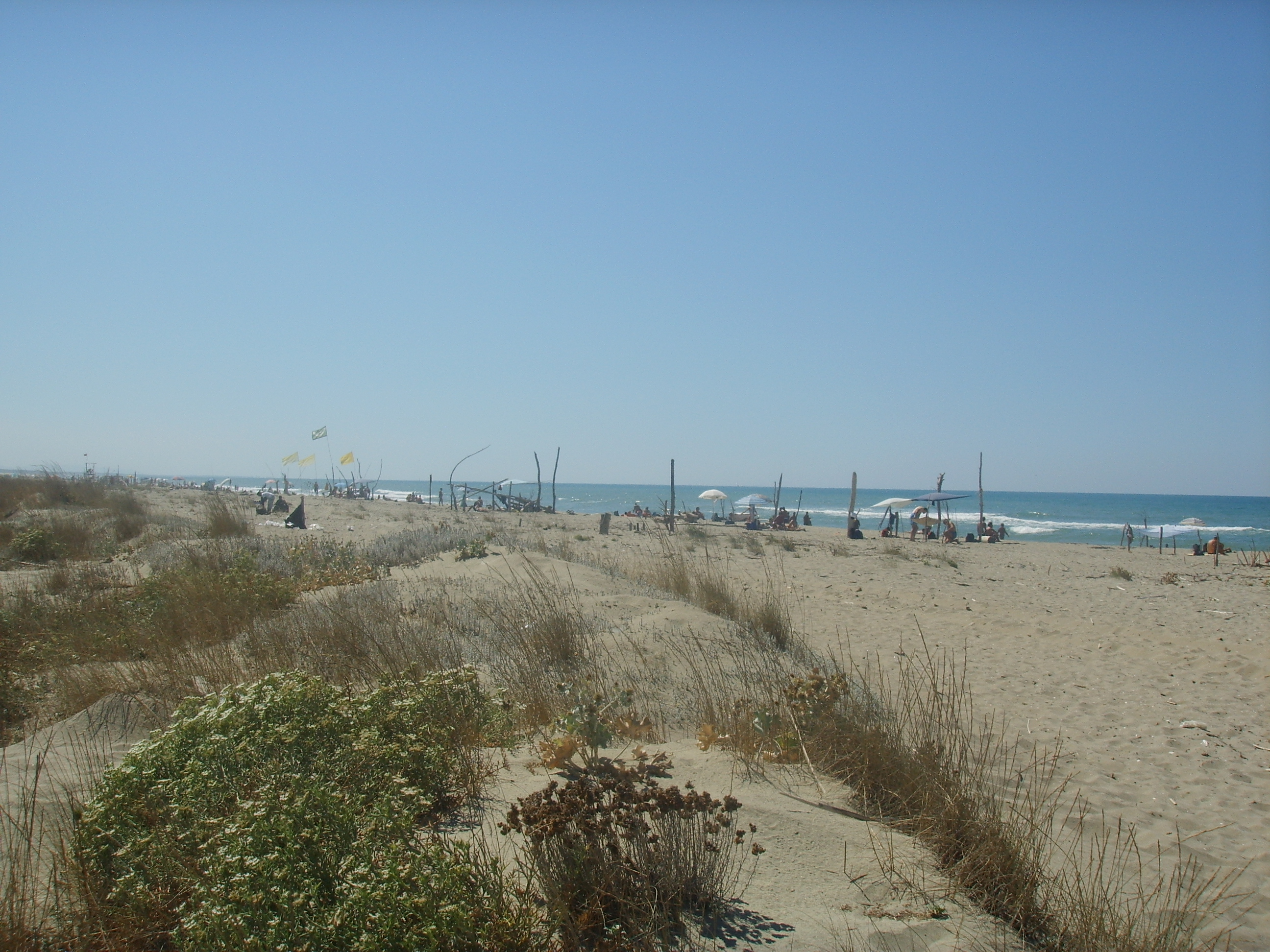
La Lecciona, gay beach.

Torre del Lago (Tower of the Lake) is a town of almost 11,000 inhabitants, a frazione of the comune of Viareggio, in the province of Lucca, Tuscany, Italy, between the Lake of Massaciuccoli and the Tyrrhenian Sea.

The Festival Puccini, an annual opera festival which attracts around 40,000 attendees, is held in its open-air theatre, a short distance from Villa Puccini where the opera composer Giacomo Puccini lived and worked. He is buried in a small chapel inside the Villa.

The area of the village on the sea (Marina di Torre del Lago) is well known for being an important gay and gay-friendly summer resort of national and international appeal.

It is served by Torre del Lago Puccini railway station.

== See also ==
- List of opera festivals
