= Lake Massaciuccoli =

Lake in Tuscany, Italy

- Lago di Massaciuccoli (Italian)
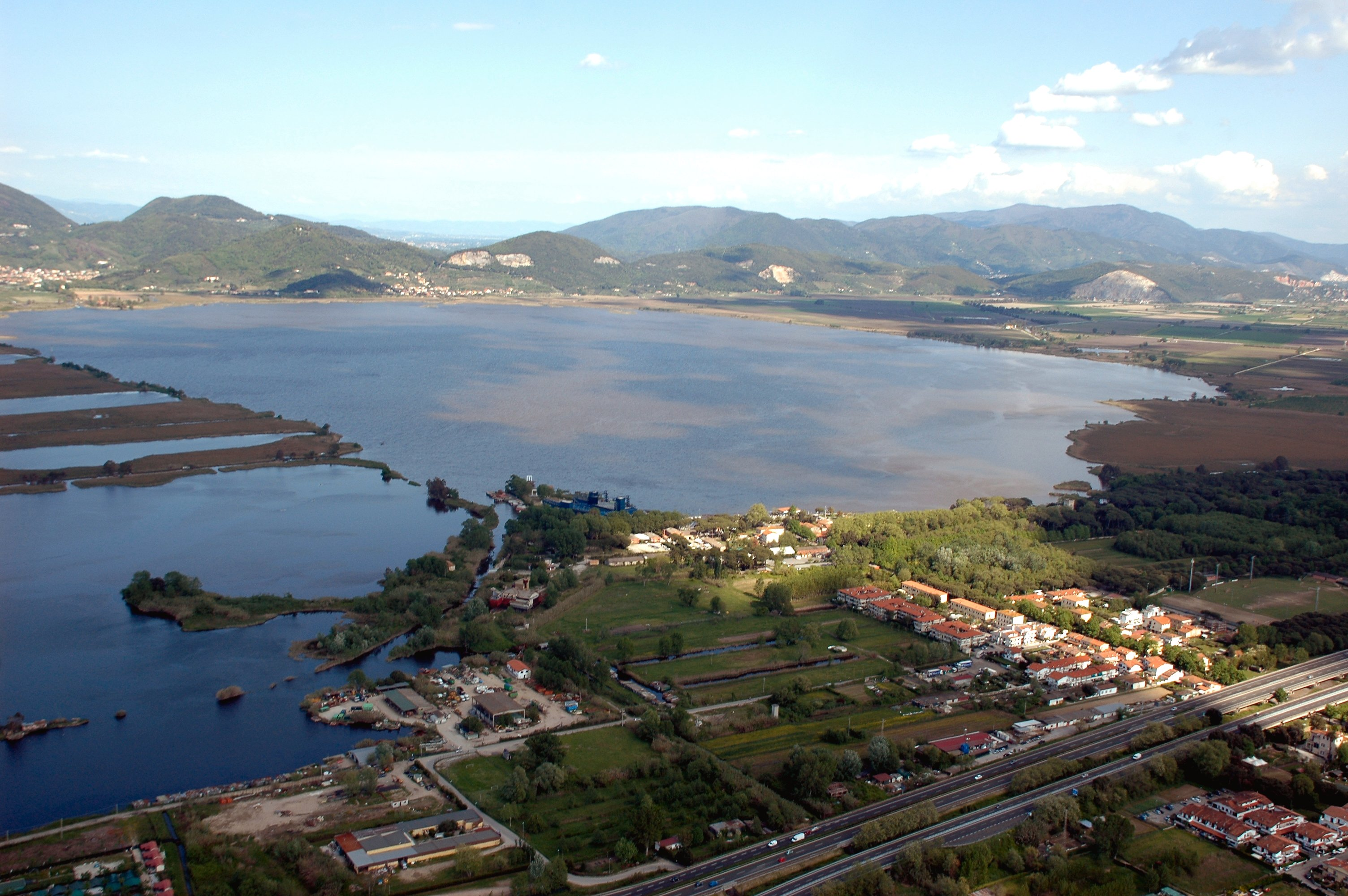

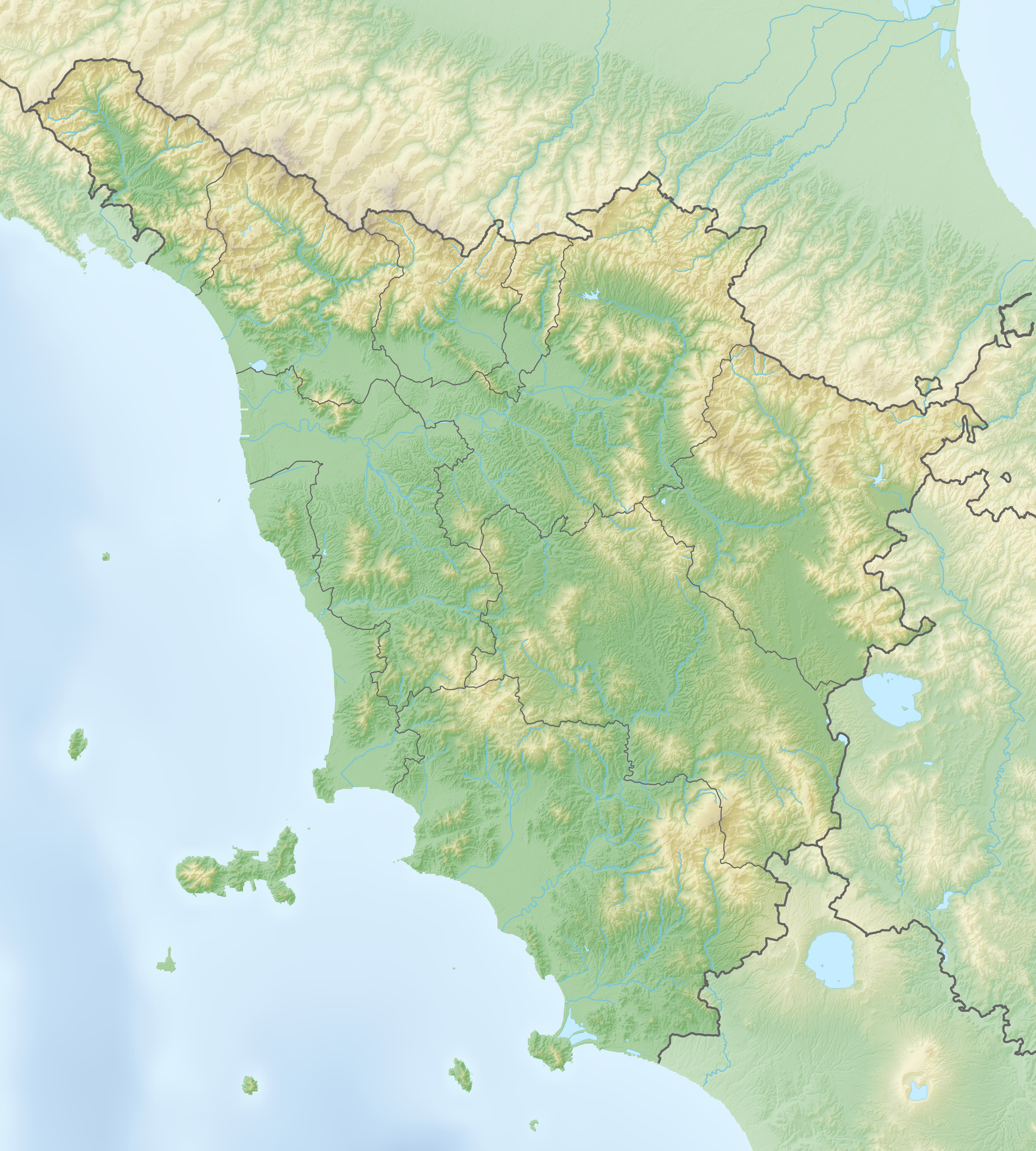
- Location within Tuscany Location within Italy
- Location: Province of Lucca, Tuscany
- Coordinates: 43°50′42″N 10°19′30″E
- Basin countries: Italy
- Surface area: 6.9 km^{2} (2.7 sq mi)

Ramsar Wetland
- Official name: Massaciuccoli lake and marsh
- Designated: 22 June 2017
- Reference no.: 2311

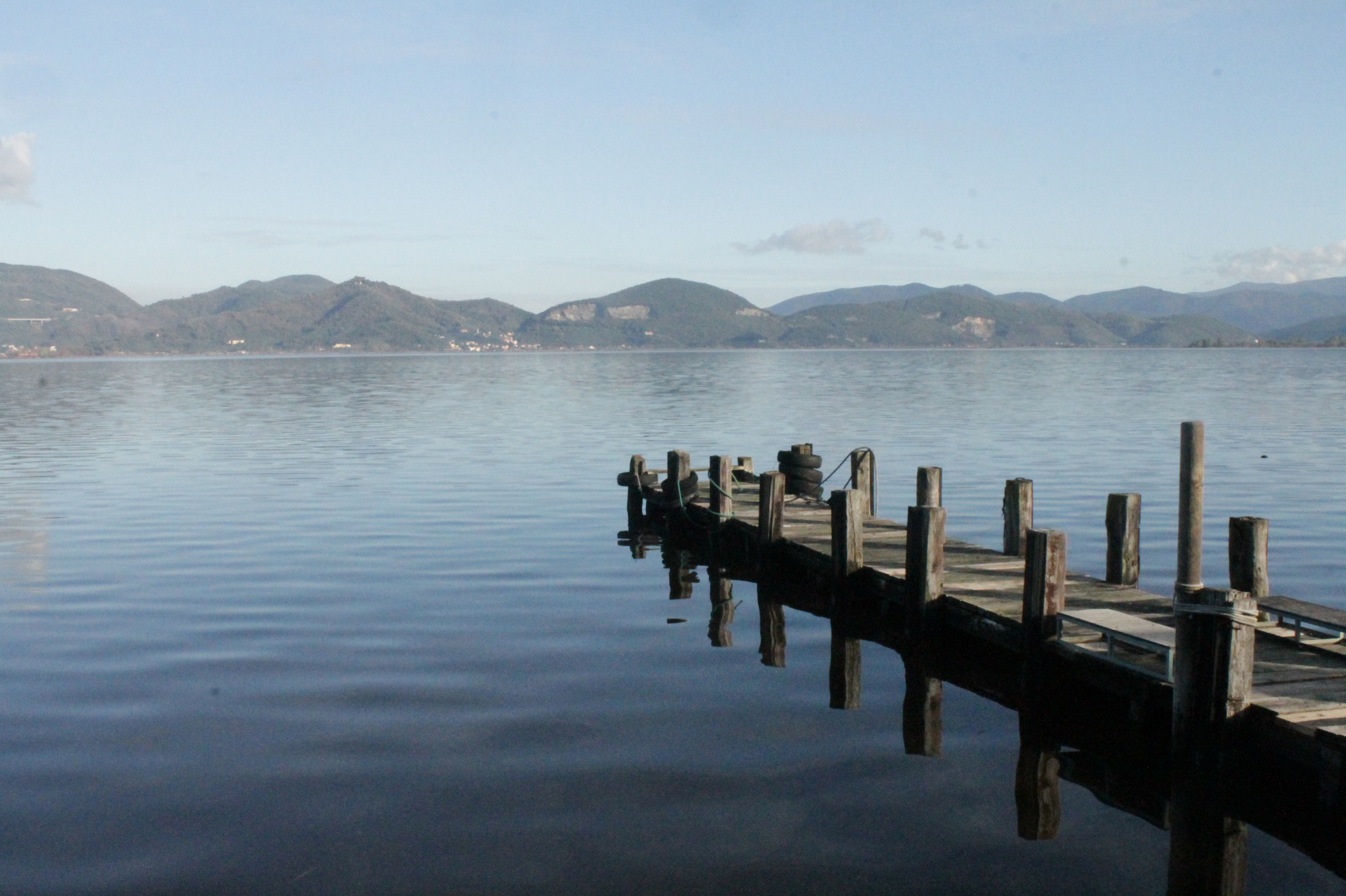
Lake Massaciuccoli from Torre del Lago

Lake Massaciuccoli (Italian: Lago di Massaciuccoli [ˈlaːɡo di massaˈtʃukkoli]) is a lake in the Province of Lucca, Tuscany, Italy. It has a surface area is 6.9 square kilometres (2.7 sq mi), and is located mainly in the municipality of Massarosa, including its parish of Massaciuccoli, and partly in Torre del Lago, a parish of Viareggio.

It is one of the largest remaining fragments of the large swamps and marshes that once covered entirely the coastal plain of Versilia. The lake was known in ancient times as the Fossis Papirianis, a name used in the Tabula Peutingeriana.

The composer Giacomo Puccini lived in a villa at Torre del Lago on the west side of the lake, and frequently hunted around the lake; the nearby village of Torre del Lago is sometimes mentioned with suffix "Puccini" in his honour.

The lake is home to the large extent of Cladium mariscus in Italy. However, vegetation and wildlife have shrunken substantially since the 20th century, due to eutrophication and expansion of Louisianan Crayfish.

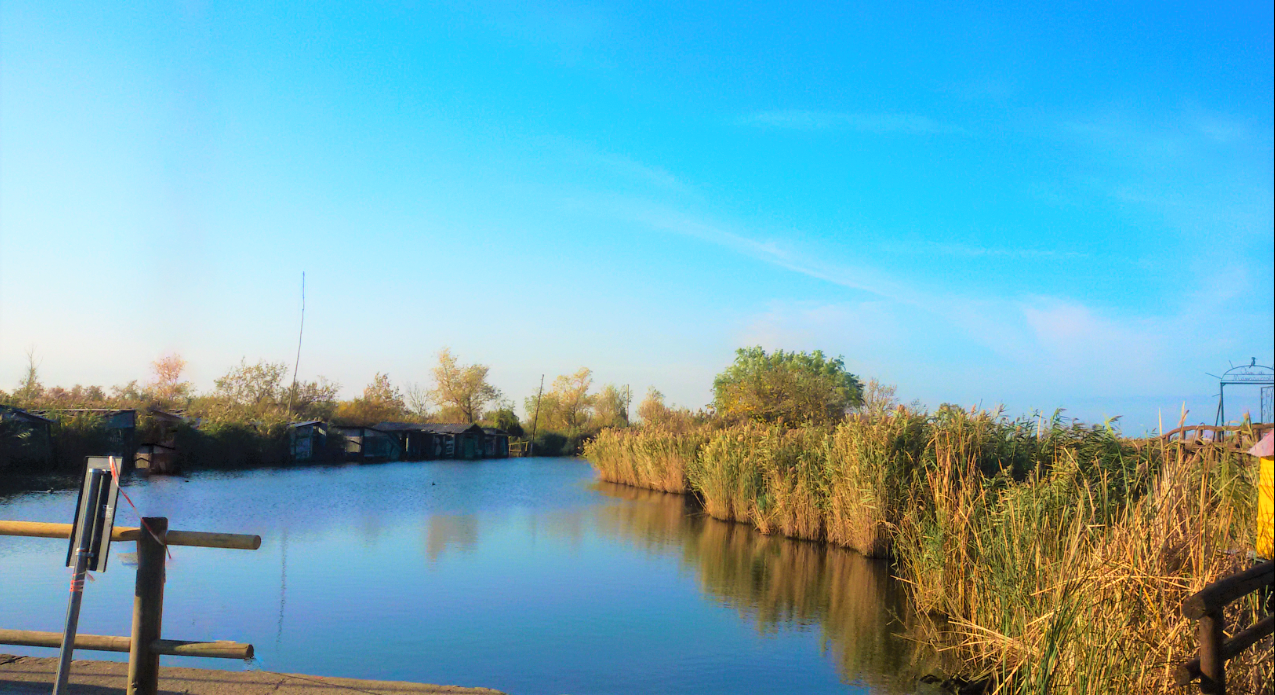
view of the lake from "Massaciuccoli Port", near Massarosa
