= Tenuta Reale (Viareggio) =

Building in Viareggio, Italy

Coordinates: 43°50′37″N 10°15′58″E

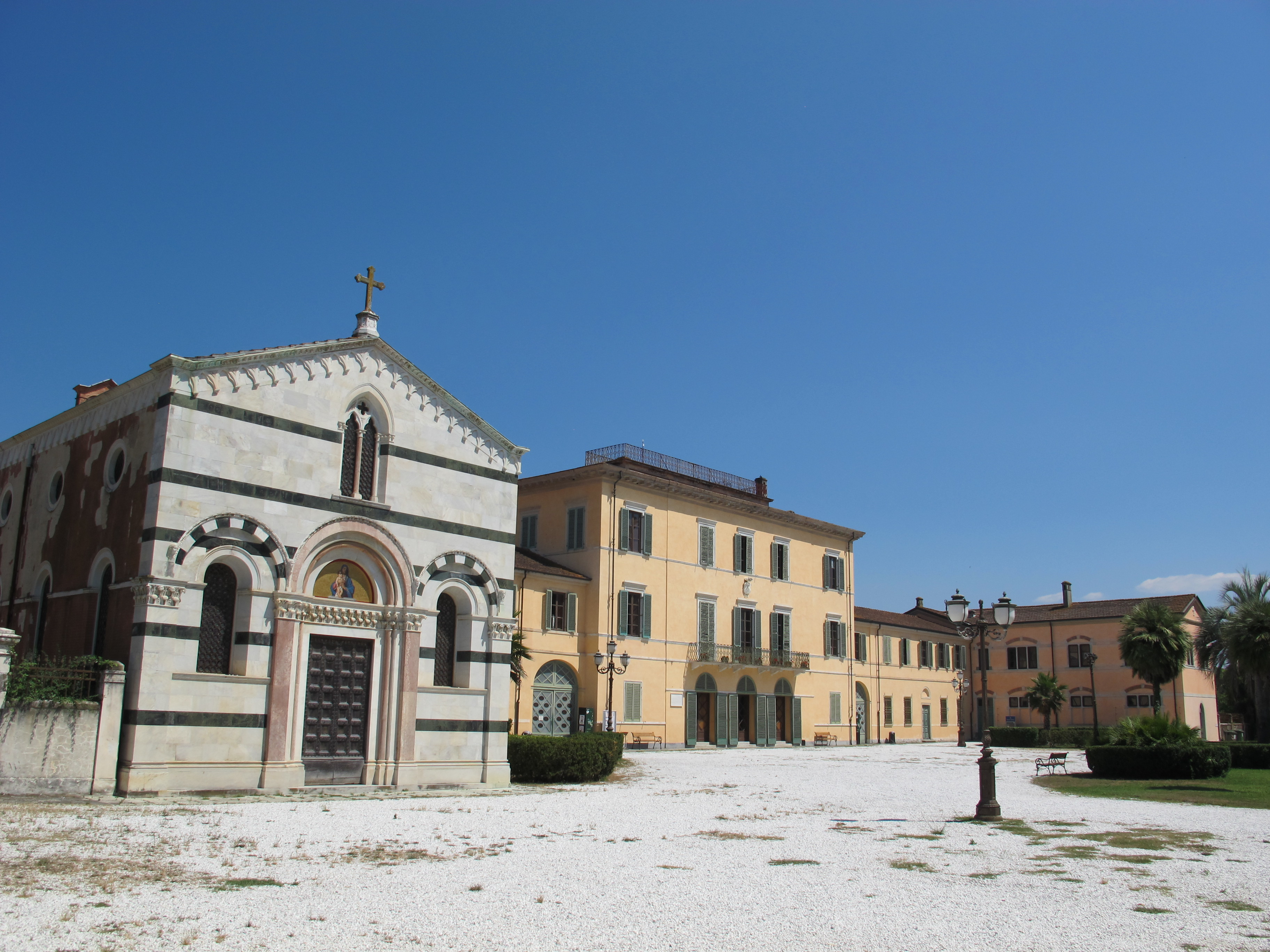
Tenuta Reale: mausoleum and Villa Borbone

Tenuta Reale (English: Royal Estate) was a landed property, located at the outskirts of Viareggio, Italy. It was carved out as private estate in the 1810s, when it covered few hundred hectares; over time its size diminished due to expropriations and sales of various plots. Tenuta belonged to the ducal family of House of Bourbon-Parma and its descendants, since the 1890s married to the Habsburg-Lothringens; in 1985 its remains were donated to the municipality of Viareggio. The centre of the estate was a large mansion known as Villa Borbone; it forms part of local architectural heritage, and its most recognized part is the sepulchral chapel, which hosts remnants of various historical personalities. The past of Tenuta Reale is at the crossroads of national histories of Italy, Spain and Austria; its other peculiarity is that it is related almost exclusively to female owners and was shaped by numerous women. The Villa currently is open to public and hosts exhibitions, conferences, concerts etc.

== Ownership and politics ==
=== Duchy of Lucca (1817–1847) ===
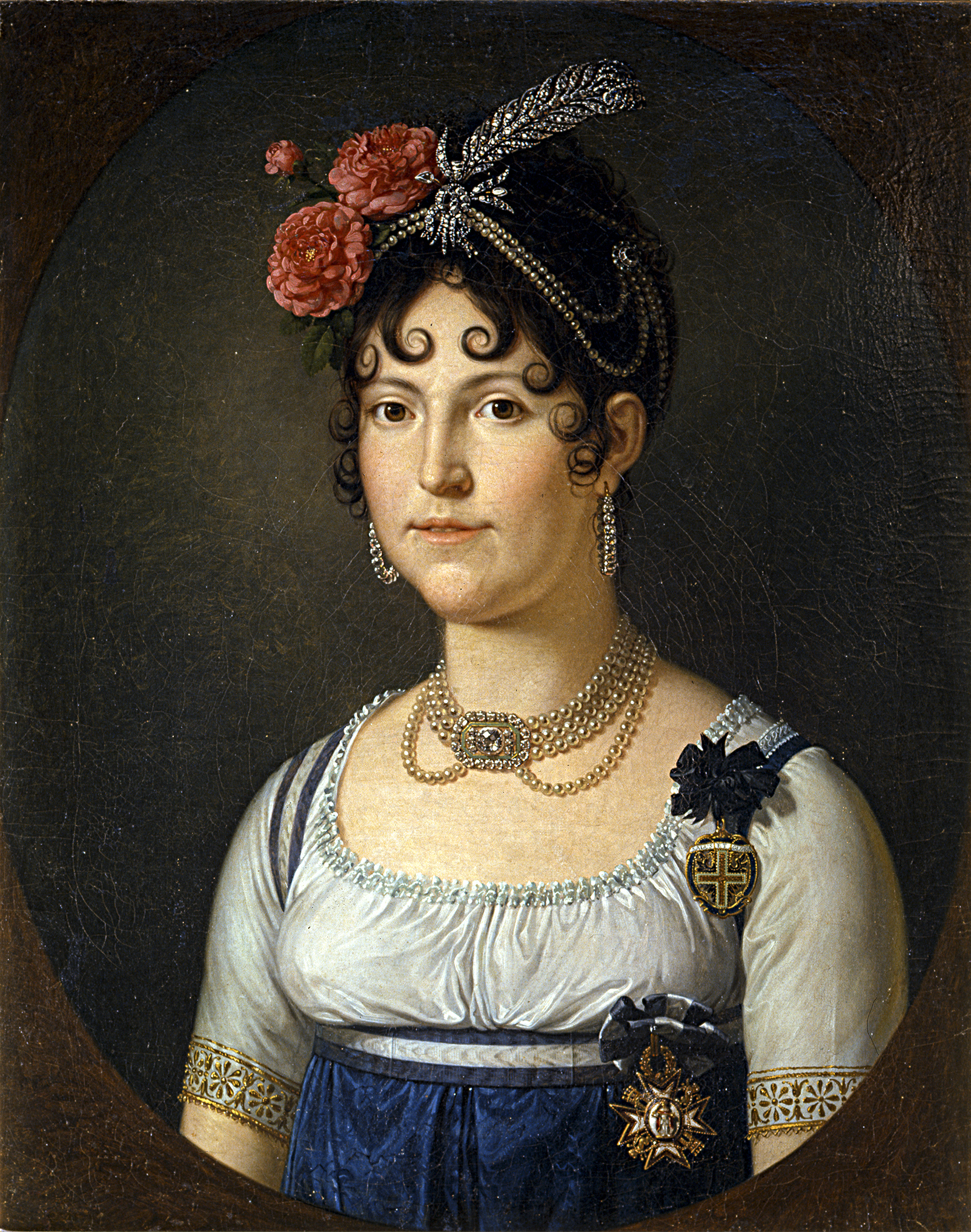
María Luisa

Until the early 19th century Viareggio formed part of the Republic of Lucca. Following a turbulent Napoleonic period it entered the newly created Duchy of Lucca. The throne of the duchy was assigned by the 1815 Congress of Vienna to the Spanish infanta María Luisa de Borbón, at the time widow after the late Luis of Bourbon-Parma, formerly heir-apparent to the Duchy of Parma. Upon assuming the reign in 1817, as the Duchess of Lucca she became the owner of numerous estates, including a hunting ground near Viareggio where she ordered construction of what would become known as Villa Borbone. After María Luisa's death in 1824 the Duchy and the estate were inherited by her son, who ruled as Carlo Ludovico (at times referred to as Carlo I).

In the mid-1840s a complex dynastic and political arrangement was engineered. The 1814 Treaty of Fontainbleau assigned the Duchy of Parma to Napoleon's second wife Marie-Louise Habsburg-Lothringen and her descendants. The Congress of Vienna confirmed her lifetime rule, but specified that after her death the Duchy would return to the Bourbon-Parma dynasty, which since 1824 was headed by Carlo Ludovico. In anticipation of his ascendance to the throne of Parma, in a secret agreement of 1844 he ceded Lucca to Grand Duchy of Tuscany. When Marie-Louise died in 1847, Carlo Ludovico formally abdicated the throne of Lucca in favor of Leopold II (Pietro Leopoldo), the Grand Duke of Tuscany, and assumed the throne of Parma as Carlo II.

=== Grand Duchy of Tuscany (1847–1861) ===
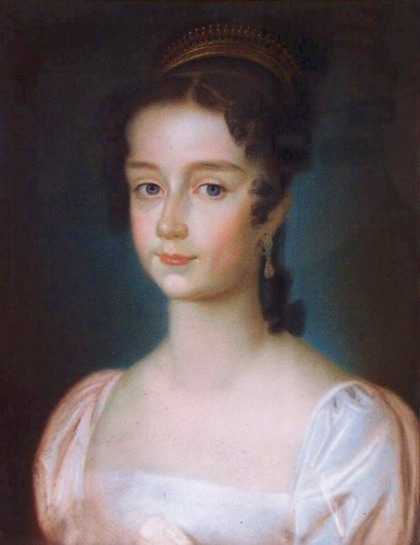
Maria Teresa

As the result of the 1847 arrangements the Duchy of Lucca ceased to exist and Viareggio became part of the Grand Duchy of Tuscany, at the time ruled by another branch of Habsburg-Lothringens. However, Carlo II when ruling in Parma remained the owner of numerous properties beyond his own state, especially in the former Duchy of Lucca. They included some estates near Viareggio, like Villa Pianore or Villa Borbone. In 1849 Carlo II abdicated from the throne in Parma in favor of his son, who would rule as Carlo III; however, the latter did not assume the ownership of Villa Borbone. Instead, the Viareggio estates became the property of Carlo II's wife and Carlo III's mother, Maria Teresa di Savoia.

In the mid-19th century the estate was already known as Tenuta Reale. Maria Teresa di Savoia barely lived there, as she preferred to reside in the nearby Villa Pianore, some 10 km away. Having buried her son in Tenuta Reale in 1854, she ordered construction of a new residence in San Martino de Vignale, at the outskirts of Lucca and some 16 km away from Villa Borbone; it was later known as Villa Maria Teresa. She barely moved away from there, and by the locals she was referred to as sepolta viva, buried alive. None of the sources consulted provides information whether any member of the family lived in Tenuta Reale in the late 1850s.

=== Kingdom of Italy (1861–1946) ===
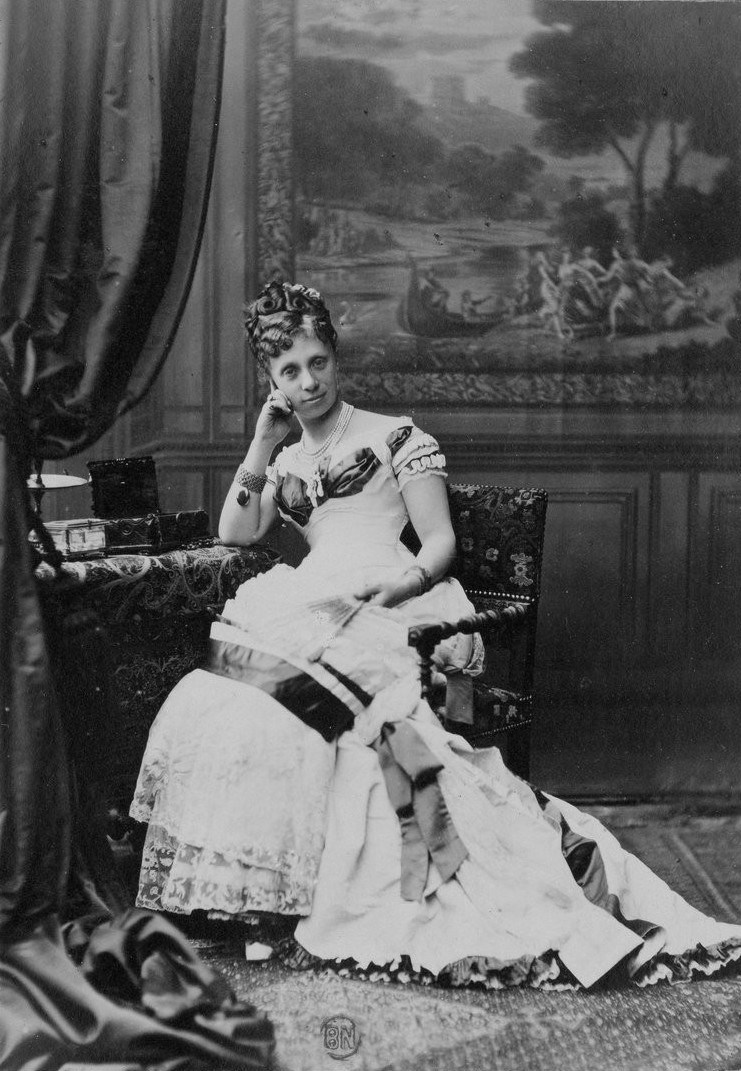
Margherita

In 1859–1860 the duchies of Parma and Tuscany ceased to exist, soon to be incorporated into the newly created Kingdom of Italy. However, political turmoil did not translate into total expropriation of fallen dynasties; Villa Borbone remained owned by Maria Teresa until her death in 1879, though she lived mostly in San Martino de Vignale. Some sources say that in her last will she marked Tenuta Reale for her granddaughter, the oldest child of late Carlo III, princess Margherita; she remained married to the Carlist claimant to the Spanish throne, by his supporters recognized as Carlos VII. Others claim that it was Carlo Ludovico who decided upon inheritance and Margherita's assumption of the property ownership. Before handover the estate was subject to scrupulous inventory works. The estate remained Margherita's property until her death in 1893.

In her last will the late princess Margherita informally divided Tenuta Reale between her 4 daughters, but legally she transferred ownership to the oldest one, Princess Blanca of Bourbon. At the time she was already married to Archduke Leopold Salvator from the deposed Tuscan branch of the Habsburgs, later to become a general in the imperial Austrian army. When Italy declared war on Austro-Hungary in 1915 to be the co-property of the enemy's military hierarchy, the estate was taken over by the Italian state and incorporated into the nearby proving ground. Since the early 1920s Blanca tried to recover Tenuta, in 1922 claimed by another party: it was seized by Fascist ex-combatants. The official Spanish diplomacy engaged to assist her, and prior to 1927 she managed to reclaim most of the estate, which she also held during the period of Italian Social Republic (1943–1944).

=== Italian Republic (1946 onwards) ===
Archduchess Blanca remained the owner of the property until her death in 1949. None of the sources consulted clarifies who formally owned Tenuta Reale afterwards, though it certainly remained in family hands. The estate was probably either inherited by one of her older daughters or became co-owned by two or more of her children. In the early 1950s the one most associated with the estate was Immaculata, in the early 1980s it was rather her sister Margherita, who died as the last of the sisters (except Assunta, who lived in Texas) in 1986. Shortly before her death, when she was 91, Margherita assisted by her nephew Dominic sold the estate (except the sepulchral chapel and some other premises) to Benvenuto Barsanti, a railway engineer who made a fortune in Venezuela.

Barsanti did not live in Tenuta Reale and in 1985, shortly after having acquired it, he donated the property to the municipality of Viareggio. Comune di Viareggio remains the owner of the estate until today, though il sindaco and the local administration can not decide upon fate of the property at will. According to the act of donation, a committee should be maintained to provide a binding opinion on every major administrative decision related to Tenuta; the committee should consist of the mayor, dean of the architecture faculty at the University of Florence, a superintendent, a representative of the Barsanti family, and a member of the municipal council. In 2005 Comune acquired also the sepulchral chapel.

== Life at Tenuta Reale ==
=== Secondary residence ===
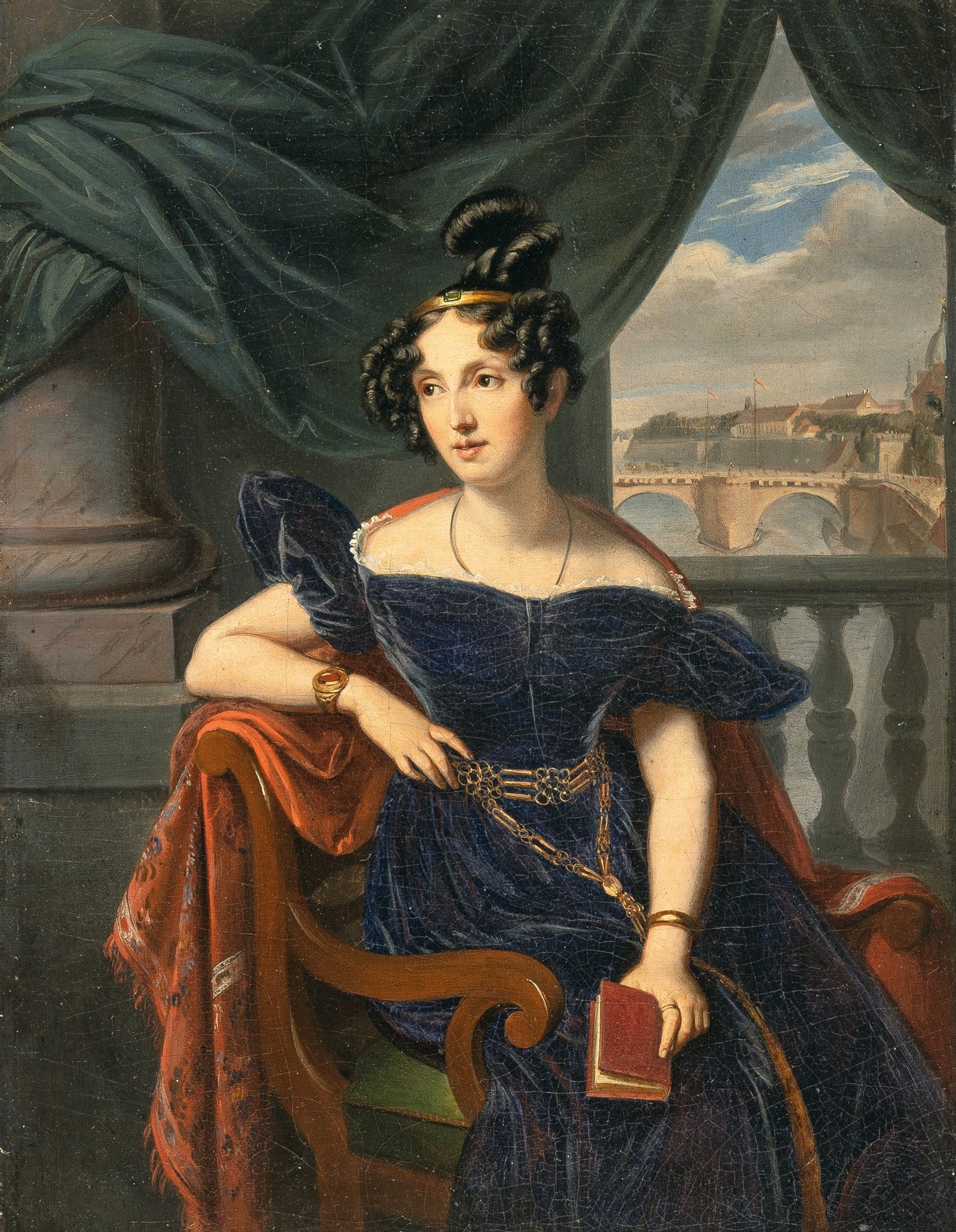
Maria Luisa

Upon assuming the throne of Lucca in 1817 the 35-year-old María Luisa and her 2 children, Carlo Ludovico (18) and Maria Luisa (15), shuttled between the ducal palace in Lucca and Viareggio, where she acquired so-called Palazzo Cittadella. She had "Lucca nella mente, Viareggio nel cuore" and was not short of energy. Charmed by the beauty of the hunting estate between Viareggio, the sea and the Massaciuccoli lake, in 1821 she contracted a young architect, Lorenzo Nottolini, to design casino per la caccia, a hunting lodge, to be connected with Palazzo Cittadella by a 5-km-long viale alberato and together with Palazzo to form a unique, huge ducal residential complex. It is not clear at what stage the construction works were when María Luisa died in 1824, at the age of 42; as she was infanta of Spain, she was buried in El Escorial.

Her heir Carlo Ludovico (ruling in Parma as Carlo II) is notorious for constant and long-time travelling across Europe. He scaled down the grandiose project of his mother, but even after its completion in the 1830s he barely lived there. It was rather wife, Maria Teresa di Savoia, who developed some sentimental relationship with the place, especially after having assumed ownership of the Viareggio estates; she shared her time between Villa Pianore and Villa Borbone. Following the 1854 assassination of their son Carlo III, the duke of Parma, she decided to bury him in the newly designed small church of San Carlos Borromeo, built at Tenuta Reale. Almost 20 years later, in 1873, the same church accommodated remains of Maria Luisa countess of Bardi, wife to the son of Carlos III. During last decades of her life Maria Teresa did not live at the estate. It was rather her husband and then widower, Carlo Ludovico, then in his late 70s, who started to visit the residence.

=== Climax: Margarita and her daughters ===
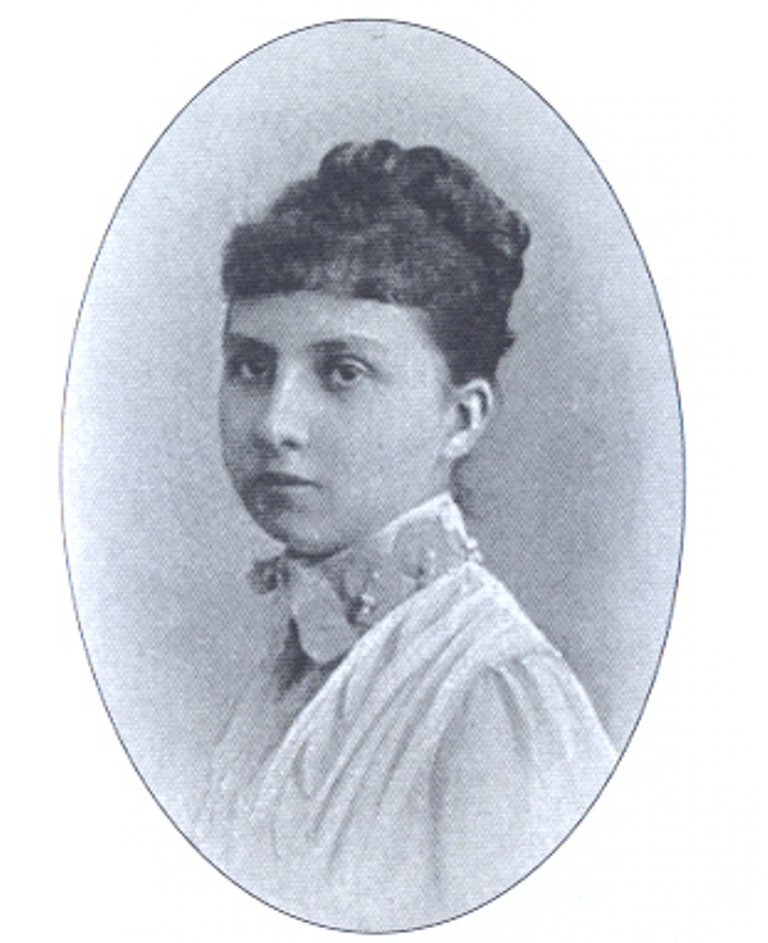
Elvira

Villa Borbone for the first time ever became the primary residence in 1879, when it was inherited by princess Margherita. She was 33 and for 13 years she remained married to the Carlist king Carlos VII. However, at that point the marriage was already in tatters; when the couple had to leave France, she settled in Tenuta Reale with her 4 daughters, aged 12, 9, 6 and 4, while Carlos started touring the world to settle in Venice later. In the 1880s the place enjoyed its climax, enlivened by the barely mid-aged lady-owner and 4 girls gradually entering the adolescent period; they were served by 36 Italian, Spanish and Austrian servants. Economically the estate operated on the sharecropping mezzadria basis. Probably in the late 1880s the place was visited by Ramón Valle-Inclán. Other distinguished family members buried in the chapel were princess Margherita's sister-in-law María Pia of Borbón-Two Sicilies (1882) and Margherita's grandfather, Carlo Ludovico (1883). Margherita herself died aged 46 and was also laid to rest in Tenuta Reale (1893).

The new owner of Villa Borbone, Margherita's oldest daughter Blanca de Borbón, was 25 years old, married to an Habsburg archduke, and had already 2 daughters. The couple followed military assignments of Leopold Salvator and in the 1890s they lived first in Lemberg and then in Agram, visiting Viareggio sporadically. The palace was inhabited by her younger sisters, all in their early 20s and living under remote supervision of their Venice-resident father. The period proved rather unfortunate. In 1896 the 25-year-old Elvira fled with a lover, an Italian painter contracted to renovate the Villa Borbone frescos. In 1897 the 21-year-old Alicia married prince Schönburg-Waldenburg, to abandon him few years later. Also in 1897 the 23-year-old Beatrix married Fabrizio Massimo (Prince of Roviano) and in 1898 in Villa Borbone she gave birth to their daughter Margherita, but the marriage also proved an unfortunate one.

=== Remote management and lawsuit ===
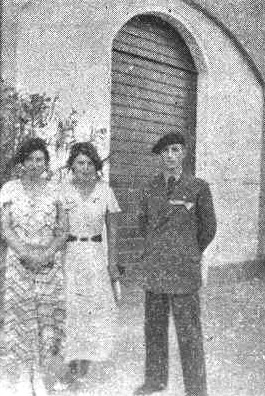
Massimo sisters in Tenuta Reale, 1933

In the early 20th century Villa Borbone was partially uninhabited, as younger sisters moved out while Blanca and Leopold Salvator resided usually in Vienna. However, in 1906 the 30-year-old Alicia married Lino del Prete from an art-related Viareggio family, which translated to their periodical residence in what now became known as Tenuta Arciducale. Family members buried in the chapel were Blanca's maternal uncles count of Bardi (1905) and Roberto (1907). Part of the estate was sold to Puccini. At the time the couple engaged in lawsuit against the Italian navy; they claimed damages caused by artillery, which operated at the proofing ground, existing south of Viareggio since the 1860s and neighboring Tenuta Reale. In 1909 the court decided that the proofing ground must by removed elsewhere by 1917, though until that happens construction of new premises in certain areas of the Tenuta would not be possible. The navy did little to close the balipedio until in 1915 Tenuta Reale was taken over by Italian state and incorporated into the proofing ground.

The fate of Tenuta Reale in the early 1920s is not clear, except isolated news about Fascist ex-combatant organisations periodically operating at the premises, continuing lawsuit and efforts of the Spanish diplomacy to get the property restored to Archduchess Blanca, who at the time lived mostly in Barcelona. Having reclaimed the estate in the late 1920s the widowed woman – now resident in Vienna – left administration to local staff and lived off moderate profits produced by local vineyards. She also rented some plots and most premises in the Villa; only few rooms were left for her and the children. Her siblings Elvira and Jaime were buried in the sepulchral chapel respectively in 1929 and 1931. In the early 1930s the place, supervised by Alicia (who lived in del Prete property in Viareggio), was at times visited by groups of Carlists paying homage to their defunct king. Modest modernization works included installation of telephone line, not without protests on part of the local staff.

=== In decay: Blanca and her daughters ===
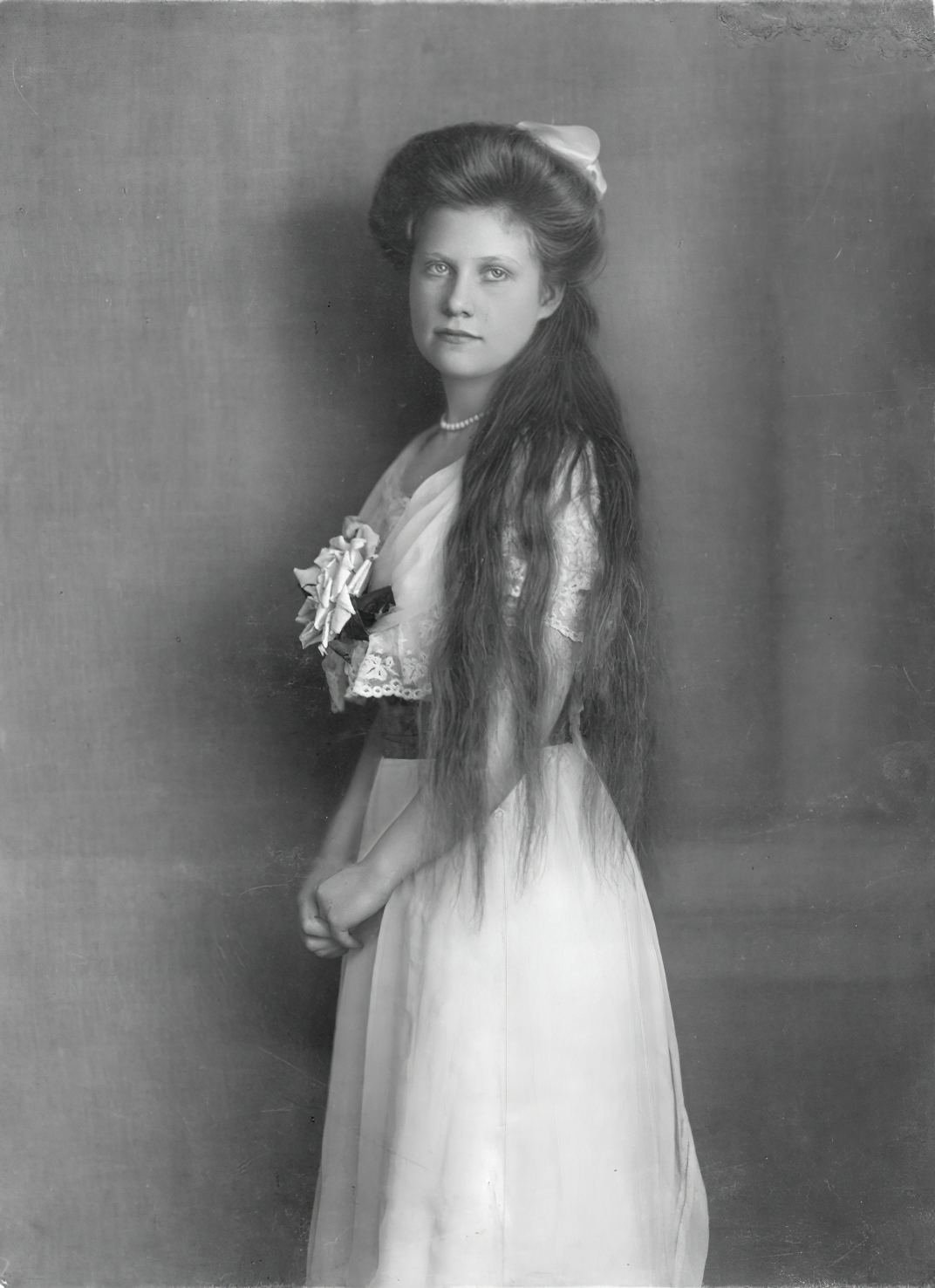
Margherita

In the 1930s Blanca lived mostly in Vienna; she permanently moved to Viareggio in 1938, aged 70 and fleeing the Nazi takeover of Austria. She lived in Tenuta together with her oldest solitaire daughter Dolores (46), her son Karl Pius (29) and his wife Christa Satzger, who in 1941 in Villa Borbone gave birth to Blanca's granddaughter, Alejandra. However, as the war progressed life in Tenuta was getting increasingly difficult, with shortages of goods and increasingly volatile social relations. The family of Karl Pius moved to Barcelona in early 1943. Following the fall of Mussolini few months later the estate was first in military "protective custody", and then occupied by unspecified uniformed formations of RSI, which was welcome by the family as measure against increasingly widespread looting. Blanca left Tenuta for Barcelona in the summer of 1944, shortly before Viareggio was seized by American troops.

It is not clear when Blanca, at the time approaching 80, returned to Tenuta; she was accompanied by her oldest child Dolores (in her mid-50s). It is neither clear in what condition they re-assumed Villa Borbone, and in particular whether the estate suffered from wartime damages and plundering. Blanca died in 1949. Dolores again moved to Catalonia; it was her childless and widowed sister, the 57-year-old Immaculata, who left her apartment in Rome and took residence in Tenuta Reale. In the early 1950s the Villa hosted Cancillería de la Orden de San Carlos Borromeo. Dolores returned to Tenuta in the early 1960s, following her rather unfortunate 10-year-spell in Spain, while one more sister, widowed Margherita, shuttled between Rome and Viareggio. In the late 1960s the estate was managed by 3 elderly women, all approaching 80 years of age and all childless. Immaculata died in 1971, Dolores in 1974 (in Villa Borbone), and Margherita in 1986.

=== Public property: tourism, culture and art ===
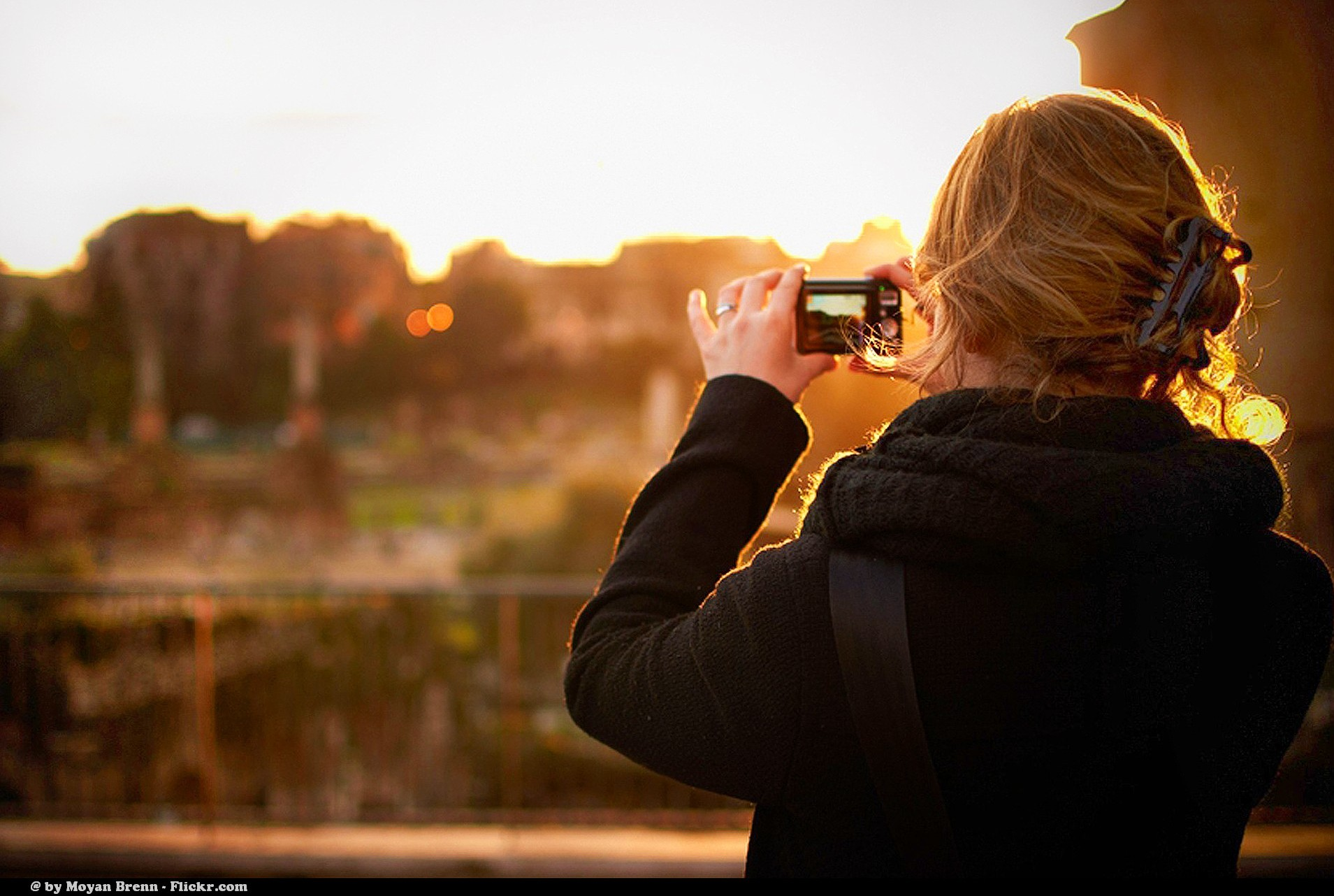
tourist, Italy

The new owner Benvenuto Barsanti did not live in the decayed Villa Borbone, following decades of no investment in a very poor shape. The residence earned its first monograph: Franco Marchetti and Renzo Pellegrini published a 200-page booklet, La Villa Borbone (Dedalus, Viareggio 1987). The municipality of Viareggio initially was not sure about the future of the estate. The premises were used mostly for various cultural events, e.g. since the late 1980s they hosted annual concerts related to Festival Pucciniano or in the early 1990s they accommodated various literary conferences. Refurbishment works of 1999–2003 partially brought the place back to shape. Since the early 21st century the residence was merged into a larger entity, named Parco Naturale Migliarino - San Rossore – Massaciuccoli; its management is located in Villa Borbone.

Currently the Villa and adjacent estate cover some 4 hectares; they host activities related to culture, science and tourism. Usually the residence is opened to public 3 hours a day, 4 days a week; the entrance is free. It accommodates exhibitions, conferences, concerts, theatrical spectacles and less ambitious shows, like Fiesta Pepperoncino or Festival della Magia; premises might be also rented on commercial basis for closed private events, like weddings. Since 2014 the place hosts Accademia Maria Luisa di Borbone, an institution dedicated to studies of the Italy-related Borbones; it issues a periodical, titled Studia Borbonica. As a tourist attraction the place gathers rather positive reviews with comments about "villa bellissima" etc., though there are also complaints about run-down state and short opening hours; in Tripadvisor service Villa Borbone is ranked as the 16th most recommended attraction in Viareggio.

== Villa Borbone ==
=== Development ===
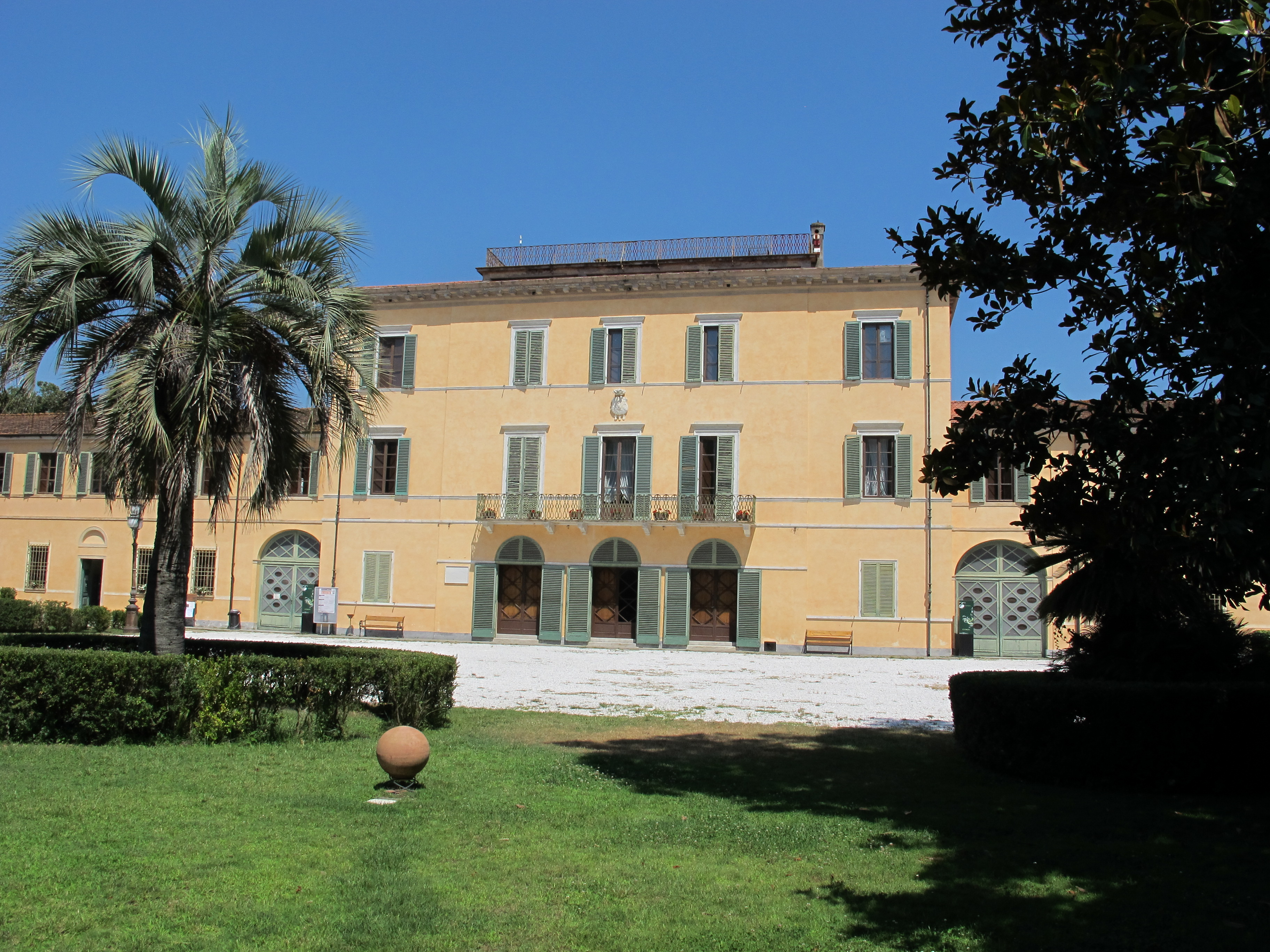
frontal façade

When contracted by Maria Luisa in the late 1810s, Nottolini designed a large landscaping project which covered the pine forest area known as Pineta di Levante, stretching for some 4 km along the sea coast from Viareggio to the border between the duchies of Lucca and Tuscany. Its axis was to be a large avenue parallel to the coastline, with perpendicular paths and specific areas designed for different types of vegetation. Some sources state that the centre of the estate was to be a hunting cottage, but others refer to a grandiose residential design, a palace intended to impress. Carlo Ludovico asked Nottolini to scale down the project. Eventually the residence was to consist of 3 separate buildings; the central one was intended as residenza signorile, to be flanked by 2 other buildings supposed to accommodate servants and as stables, magazines, workshops, a forge, a carriage house and similar. In the 1840s the central edifice was enlarged with side wings, which connected all 3 buildings.

Since the mid-1840s 17 farmsteads were lined up along the Tenuta, divided into 28 2.5-hectare plots; they were intended for farmers working the vineyards; because the residence was re-calibrated as centre of the agricultural economy, outbuildings were constructed immediately north of the villa. At the turn of the 1840s and 1850s a small church of San Carlo Borromeo, designed perhaps by Nottolini but after his death completed by Giuseppe Pardini, was built adjacent to the western end of the northern building. In the early 1880s it was turned into a marble-covered sepulchral chapel according to the plan by Giuseppe Gheri and in course of works completed by Domenico Martini. Also during the 1880s both the main façade and the interior underwent major re-design works. Since then the residence itself did not change much, except for necessary maintenance works, secondary features (removing blind arches) and decorative details (railings, windows). Some modifications affected the limehouse and the side wings; outbuildings were enlarged to host a canteen and flats for servants and workers, and dilapidated steadfarms were replaced with newer huts.

=== Residential villa ===
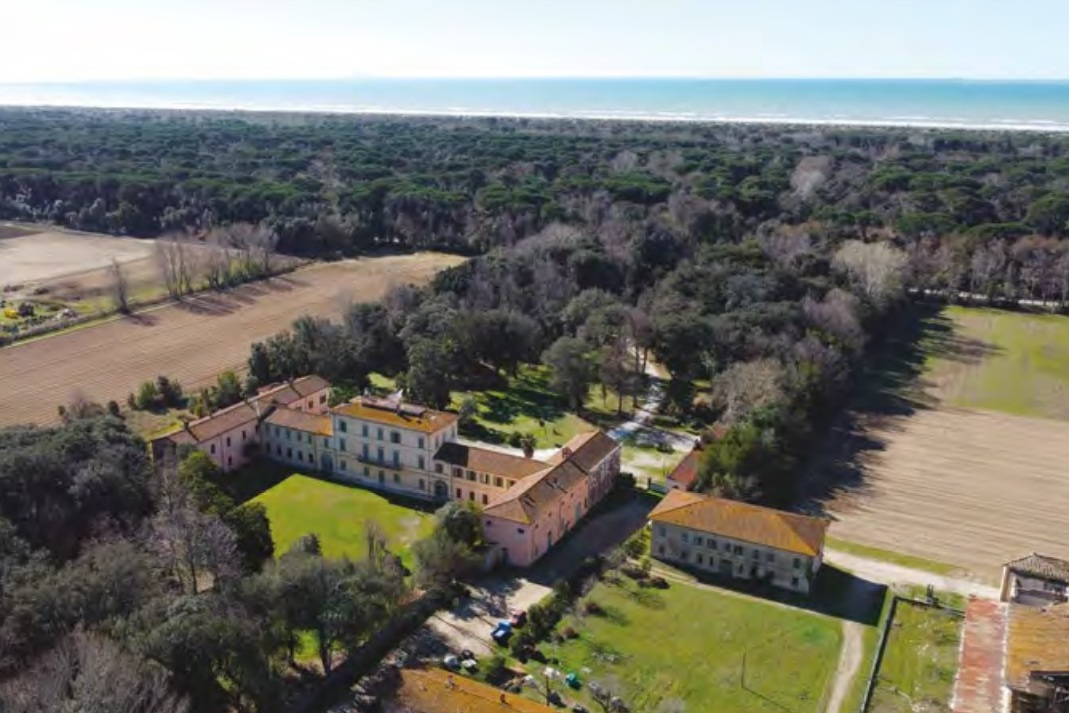
villa, park, pine forest and the sea

The residence, set on the H-shaped layout, covers 3.500 square meters in the 3-floor central part and in two 2-floor lateral wings. Though it was initially intended as an aristocratic palace, to perform also official roles related to ducal authority, when completed it adhered rather to the high-bourgeoisie format. There are no grandiose staircases or huge palazzo-style ballrooms; instead, apart from few larger salons, the building consists mostly of smaller spaces: antechambers, sitting rooms, drawing rooms, bedrooms, bathrooms, kitchens, latrines etc. Though until the late 19th century the prevailing decorative convention was typical for the Italian ottocento interior, due to later refurbishments and renovations it started to adhere more to "gusto mitteleuropeo", with decorative references to the Vienna Hofburg. Typical Tuscan features, be it general composition of the elevation or details like Doric order cornice and cyma recta/cyma reversa mouldings, remain rather on the exterior.

There is little left of the original interior decorum of the residence, mentioned e.g. in the 1879 inventory (French wallpapers, ceilings of reeds with lime, frescos, stucco decorations), though Italian art-specialists did their best to restore tiled floors, window frameworks or marble fireplaces. Most furniture is either not original or not related to the very place, though it has been carefully selected to restore the aristocratic-bourgeoisie ambience of the 19th century; however, many rooms remain entirely empty. Numerous paintings and few busts depict former owners of the residence or other members of the Borbón, Bourbon-Parma and Habsburg-Lothringen families, including dukes of Parma and Carlist claimants to the Spanish throne. Numerous cabinets contain tableware, decorations, private papers, photographs and other objects related to the Borbón-Parma family, though not necessarily to its members living in Villa Borbone.

=== Mausoleum ===
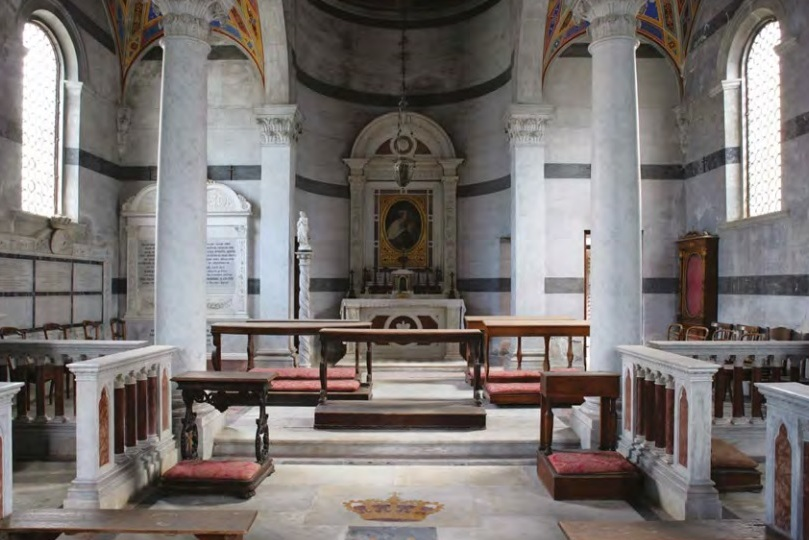
mausoleum

The sepulchral chapel, also referred to as mausoleum or Capella della Macchia, stands on some 150-square-metre base. Its architecture is referred to as neo-Romanesque in appearance, also named Lombard Style. The most eye-catching element of the exterior is the front façade, modeled after the Lucca church of Santa Giulia. Pardini adopted the solution of blind arcades, the trefoil mullioned window, and the two-color marble from Prato and Carrara. The archway, which has a similar design to that of the Lucchese church with pilasters and the archivolt of a similar pinkish lithotype of the Breccia di Seravezza genre, has a thick lintel decorated with acanthus leaves in continuity with the capital of the pilasters, slightly projecting (and not recessed) with respect to the facing. The side elevations are reinterpreted with plasterwork, treated to imitate brick.

The interior features marble columns and pilasters which frame the polychrome marble tombs set against the walls. The space is lit by the single-light windows of the main façade and the side ones surmounted by oculi. The walls are designed with the same two-color bands over which the sapphire sky hangs. The design of the tombs is Renaissance style, with an arcosolium. Their architectural layout is based on the Bruni and Marsuppini sepulchres, both in the church of Santa Croce in Florence. The set of lines and materials also includes neo-fourteenth-century references evident in the monument to Carlo Ludovico, with the mixed-line conclusion containing the pointed arch lunette and the paneling of the tripartite back wall with trefoil motifs. The tomb of Roberto I is a sepulchral sarcophagus "in 15th century style". Other tombs, one on top of the other, are spaced out by marble slabs in the short space of a cell, and remain illuminated by the silver gleam of a frosted glass window.

=== Vegetation ===
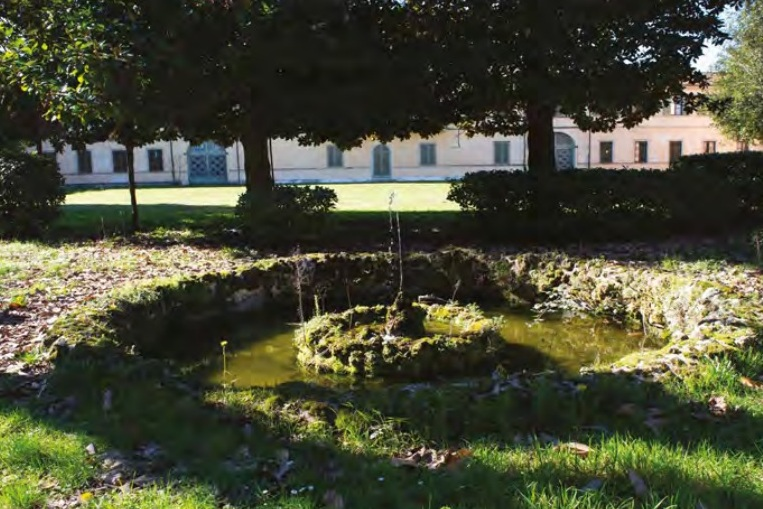
park

What attracted Maria Luisa to the place was its natural charm, derived from the pine forest and the long, gentle coastal line. Over time the area in vicinity of the residence was crossed by a system of circular and perpendicular paths; some of it was converted to fruit tree orchards and vegetable gardens with hedges, while some was turned to park. The long stretch east of what is now Viale dei Tigli was turned into arable land and served as vineyards. Under the ownership of princess Margherita the green area was divided into rectangles; parks and gardens were intended solely for cultivation of flowers and ornamental plants, one part laid out in English style and another in Italian one, with fountains, small canals, bridges and sculptures. Greenhouses and a limehouse were either built or enlarged. However, her largest passion was horticulture; various Orti di Margherita were set up, with seeds brought also from Spain and France.

Today the entire estate, currently named Tenuta di Borbone e Macchia Lucchese, forms part of Migliarino / San Rossore / Massaciuccoli natural park. The ornamental park next to the residence is its most neglected area, though a fraction of it is turned into a "Sonic Garden", playing mostly the music of Puccini. The paths, formerly delimited by stone curbs and naturalized by topiary hedges, after decades of neglect have acquired a disorderly shrubby form. Recent inventory identified 357 trees of some 20 species, divided into holm oaks, lime trees, magnolias, plane trees and cycadaceae-palmaceae, plus shrub species made of laurels and boxwood; the plan for enhancement is in place, including clearing the undergrowth and installing a lighting system (currently there is none). The pine forest between Viale dei Tigli and the sea has been left largely untouched and is referred to as a "thousand-year-old forest"; two of its smaller sections, Riserva Naturale della Lecciona and Riserva Naturale della Guidicciona, are subject to strict protection regulations. The limehouse is currently an empty space; some of the greenhouses and Margarita's vegetable gardens are still exploited commercially.

== Tables ==
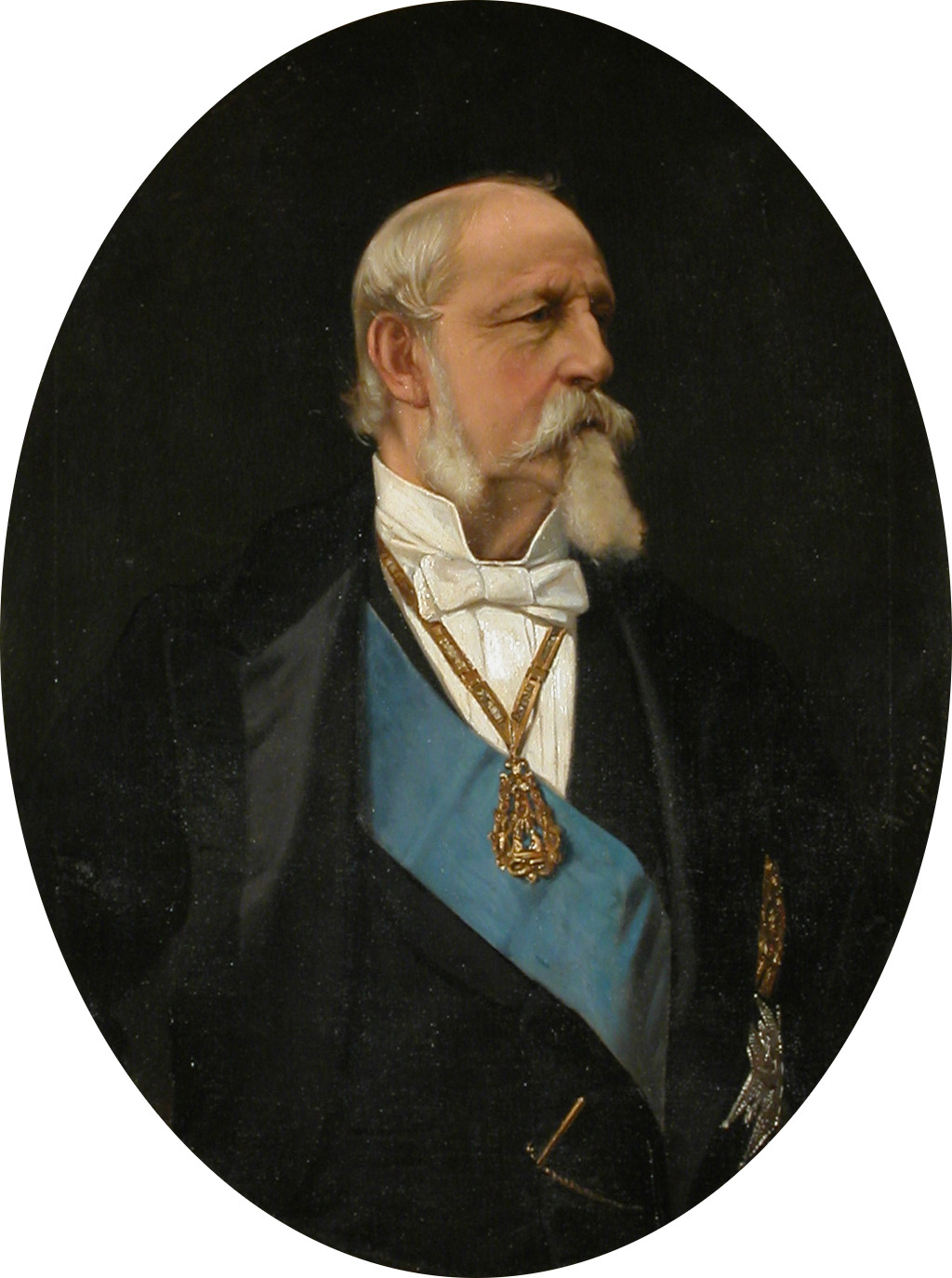
Charles II
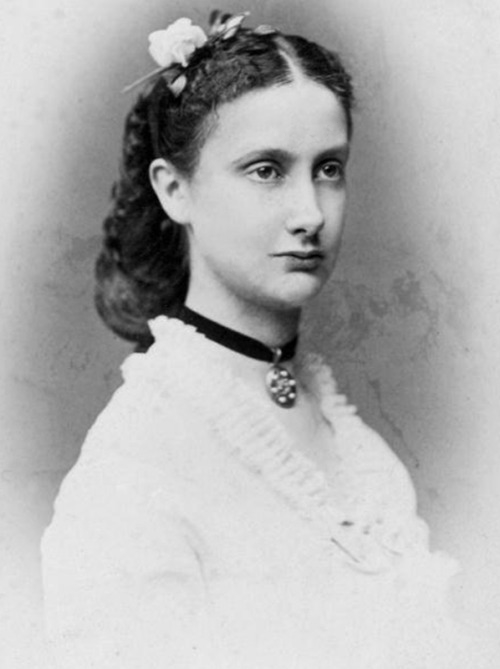
Maria Luisa
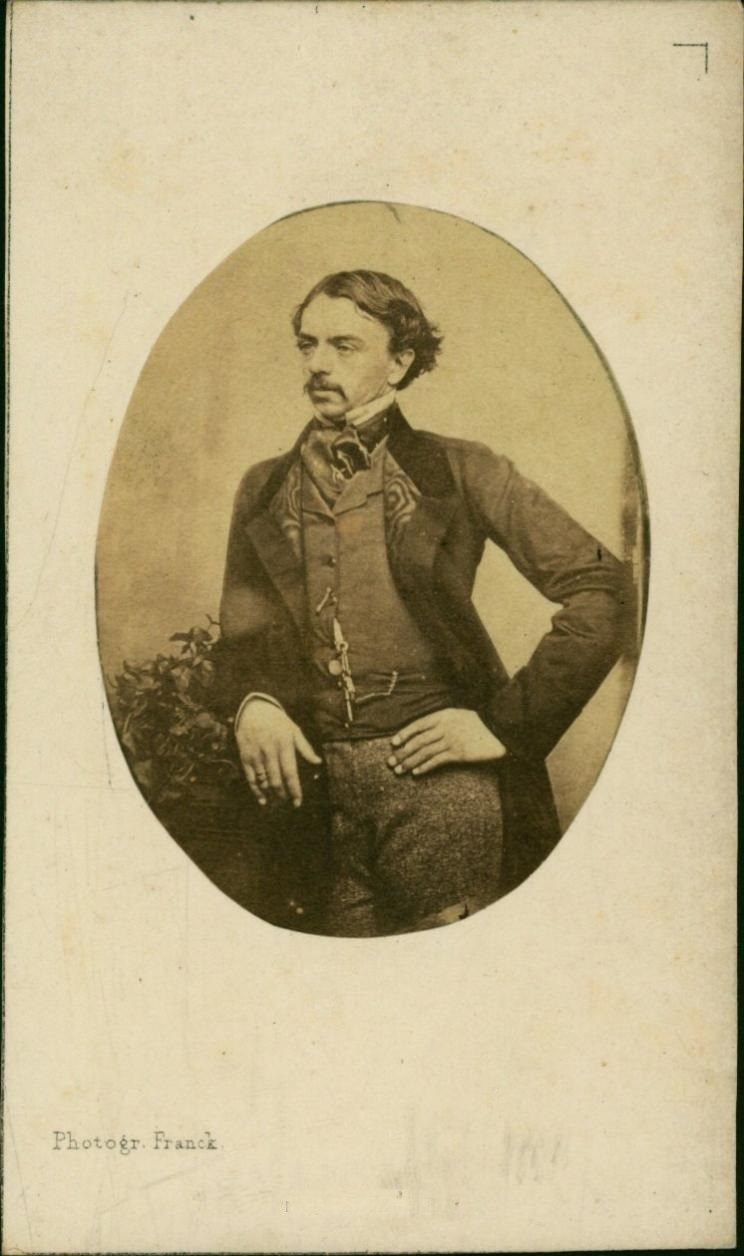
Charles III
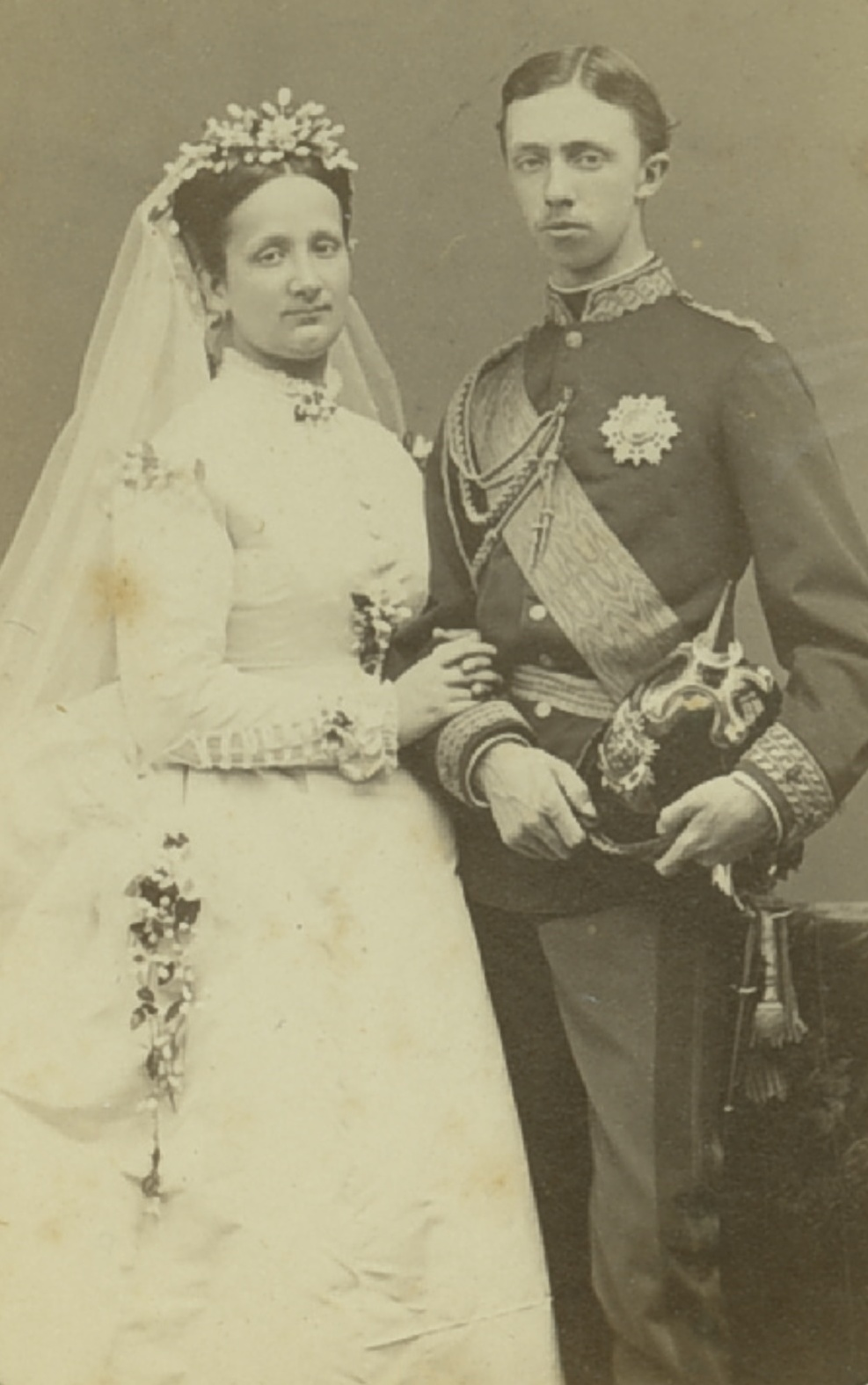
Maria Pia
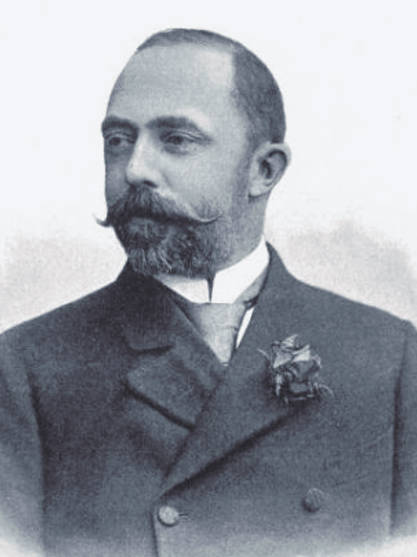
Robert I
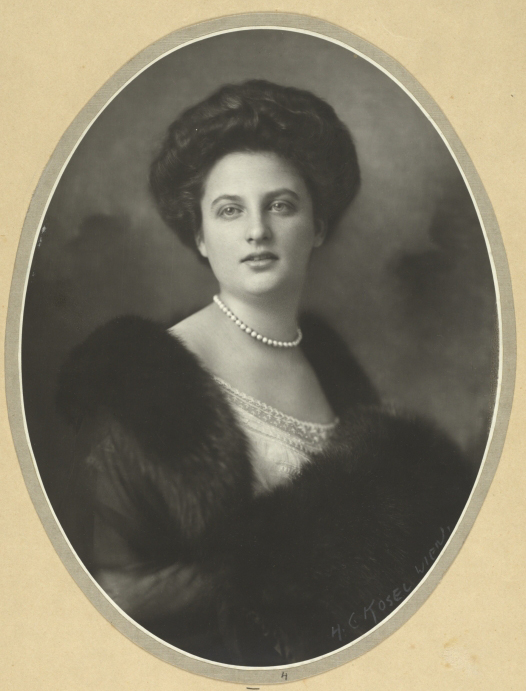
Immaculata

=== Owners of Tenuta Reale ===
Tenuta Reale owners
owner	from	to	years	to previous owner
Maria Luisa, Duchess of Lucca	1817	1824	7	n/a
Charles II, Duke of Parma	1824	1849	25	son
Maria Teresa of Savoy	1849	1879	30	wife
Margherita of Bourbon-Parma	1879	1893	14	granddaughter
Blanca of Bourbon	1893	1949	56	daughter
Immaculata of Habsburg-Lothringen	1949	1971	22	daughter
Margaretha of Habsburg-Lothringen	1971	1985	14	sister
Benvenuto Barsanti	1985	1985	1	unrelated
municipality of Viareggio	1985	onwards	ongoing	n/a

=== Buried in Villa Borbone chapel ===
individuals buried in the chapel
name	buried	died aged	role
Charles III, Duke of Parma	1854	31	Duke of Parma (1849–1854)
Maria Luisa of Bourbon-Two Sicilies	1874	19	daughter-in-law to Charles III
Anastasia of Bourbon-Parma	1881	1	daughter to Robert I
Maria Pia of Bourbon-Two Sicilies	1882	33	wife of Robert I
Charles II, Duke of Parma	1883	83	Duke of Lucca (1824–1847), Duke of Parma (1847–1849)
Margherita of Bourbon-Parma	1893	46	daughter to Charles III
Henri of Bourbon-Parma	1905	54	son to Charles III
Robert I, Duke of Parma	1907	59	Duke of Parma (1854–1859)
Immaculata of Bourbon-Parma	1914	40	daughter to Robert I
Elvira of Bourbon	1929	58	daughter to Margherita of Bourbon-Parma
Jaime of Bourbon	1931	61	son to Margherita of Bourbon-Parma, Carlist claimant (1909–1931)
Blanca of Bourbon	1949	81	daughter to Margherita of Bourbon-Parma
Beatrice of Bourbon	1961	87	daughter to Margherita of Bourbon-Parma
Immaculata of Habsburg-Lothringen	1971	79	daughter to Blanca of Borbón
Maria della Neve Massimo	1984	82	daughter to Beatrix of Borbón

== Gallery ==
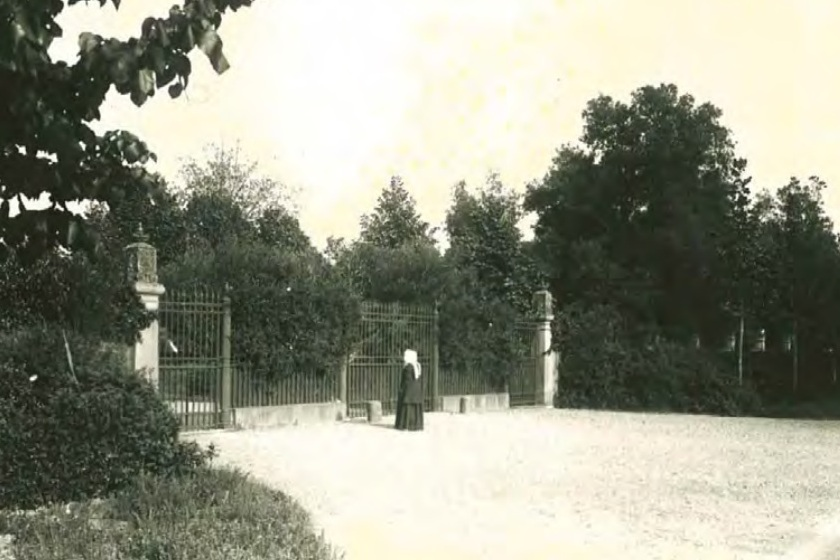
entry gate, early 20th c.

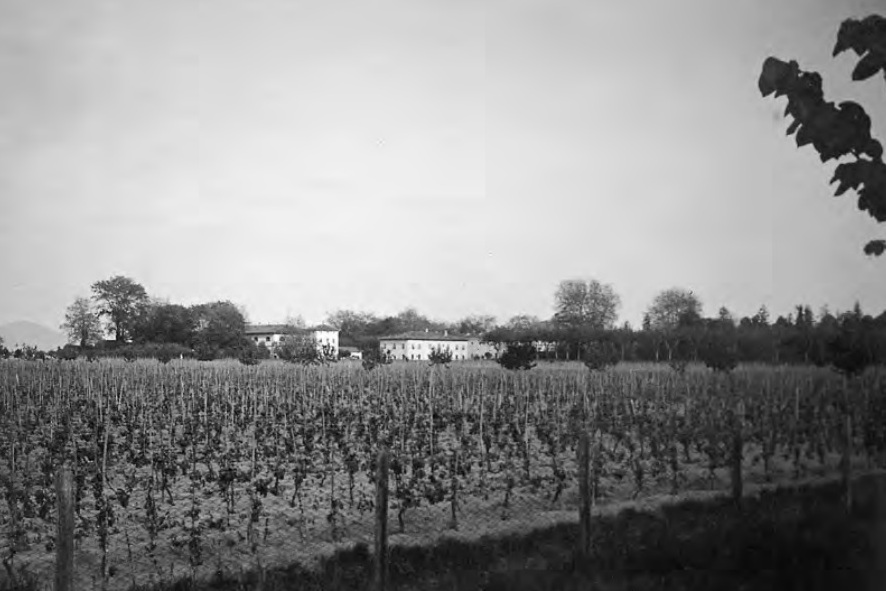
with vineyards, 1910s

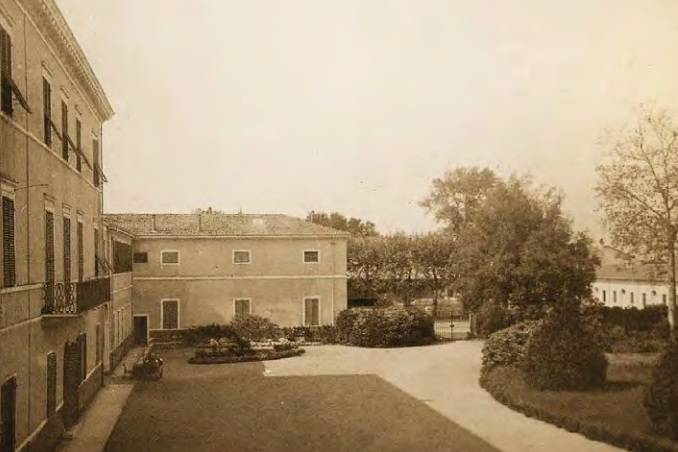
backyard, 1910s

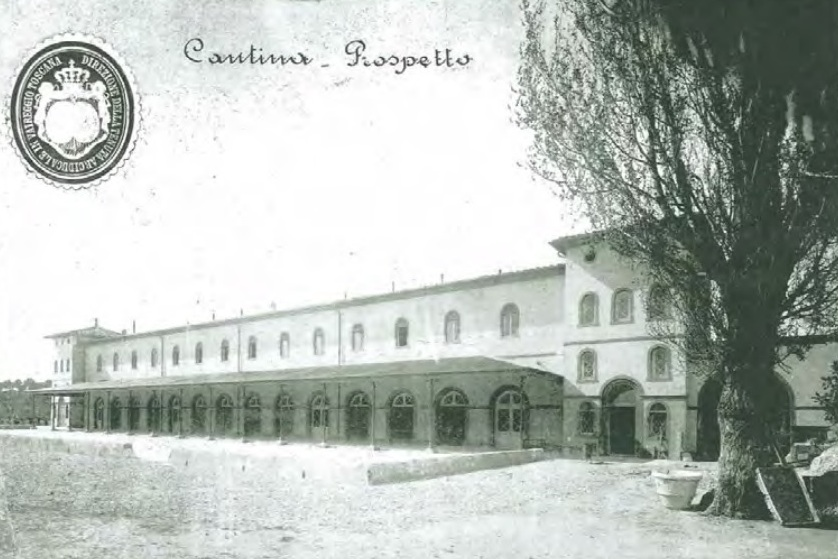
outbilding: canteen, 1920s

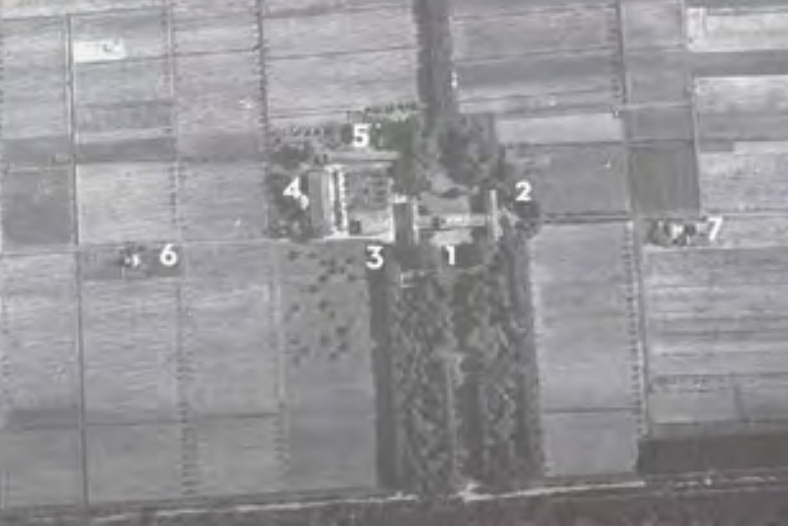
aerial view, 1930s

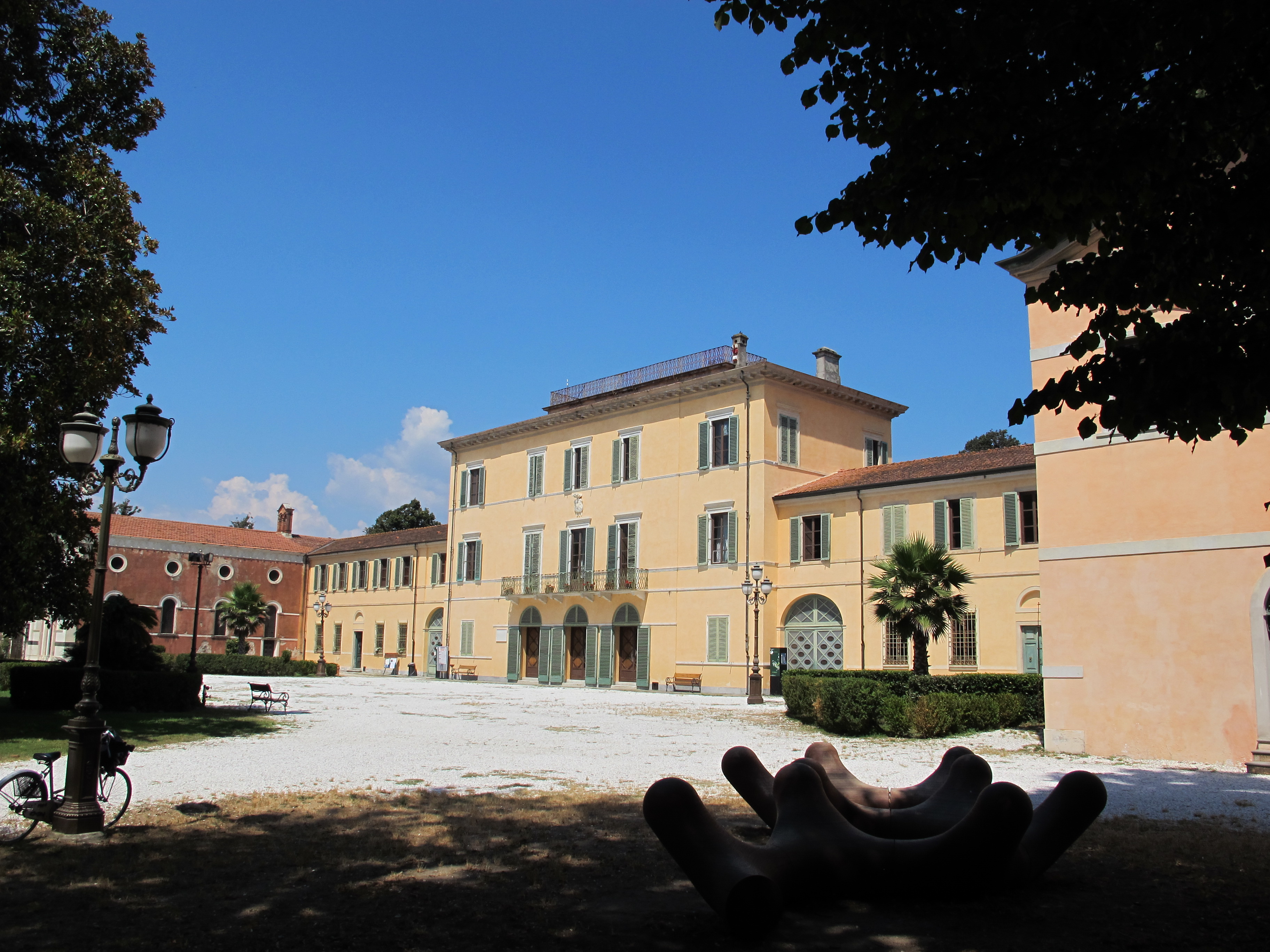
main façade

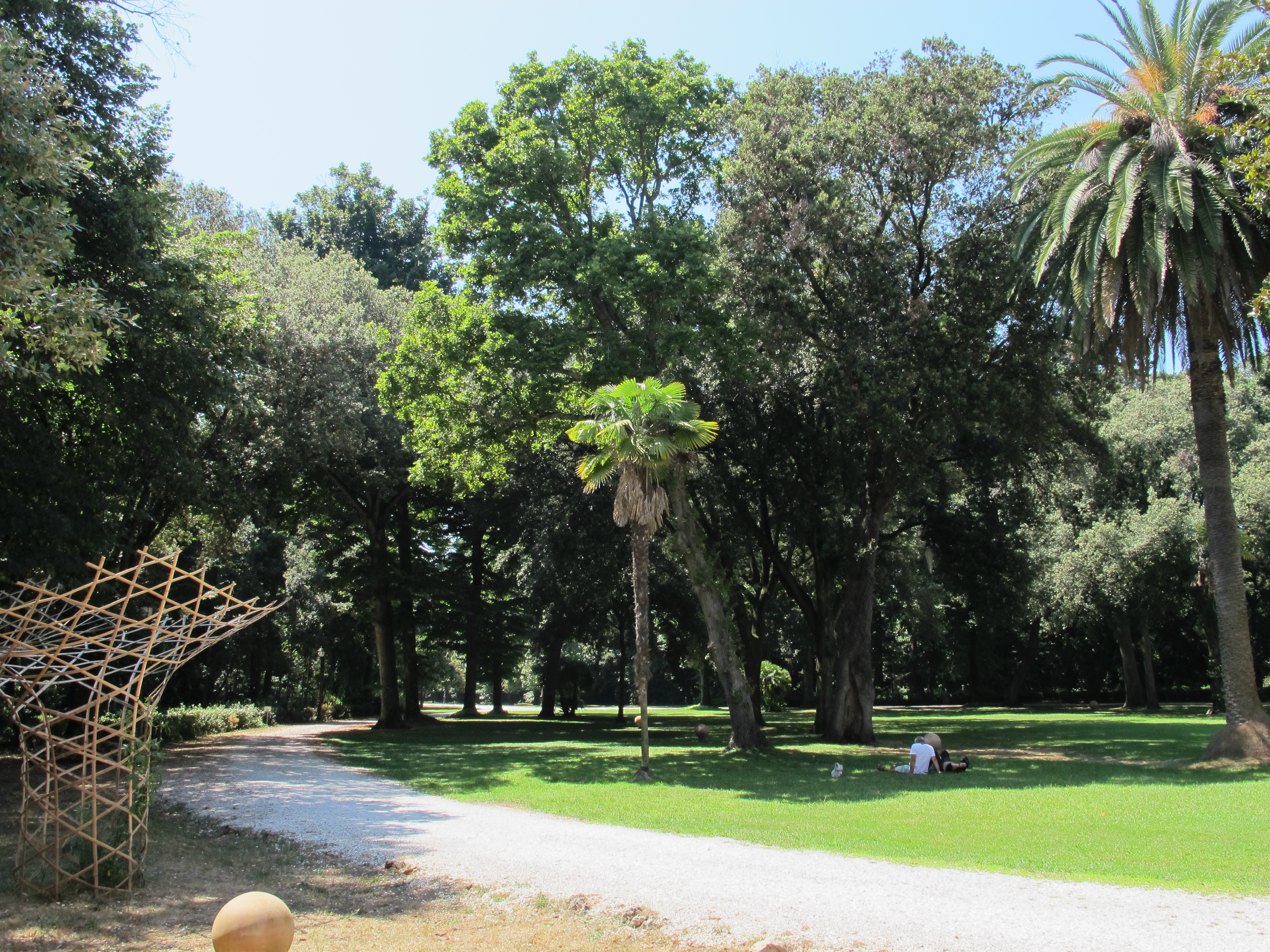
park

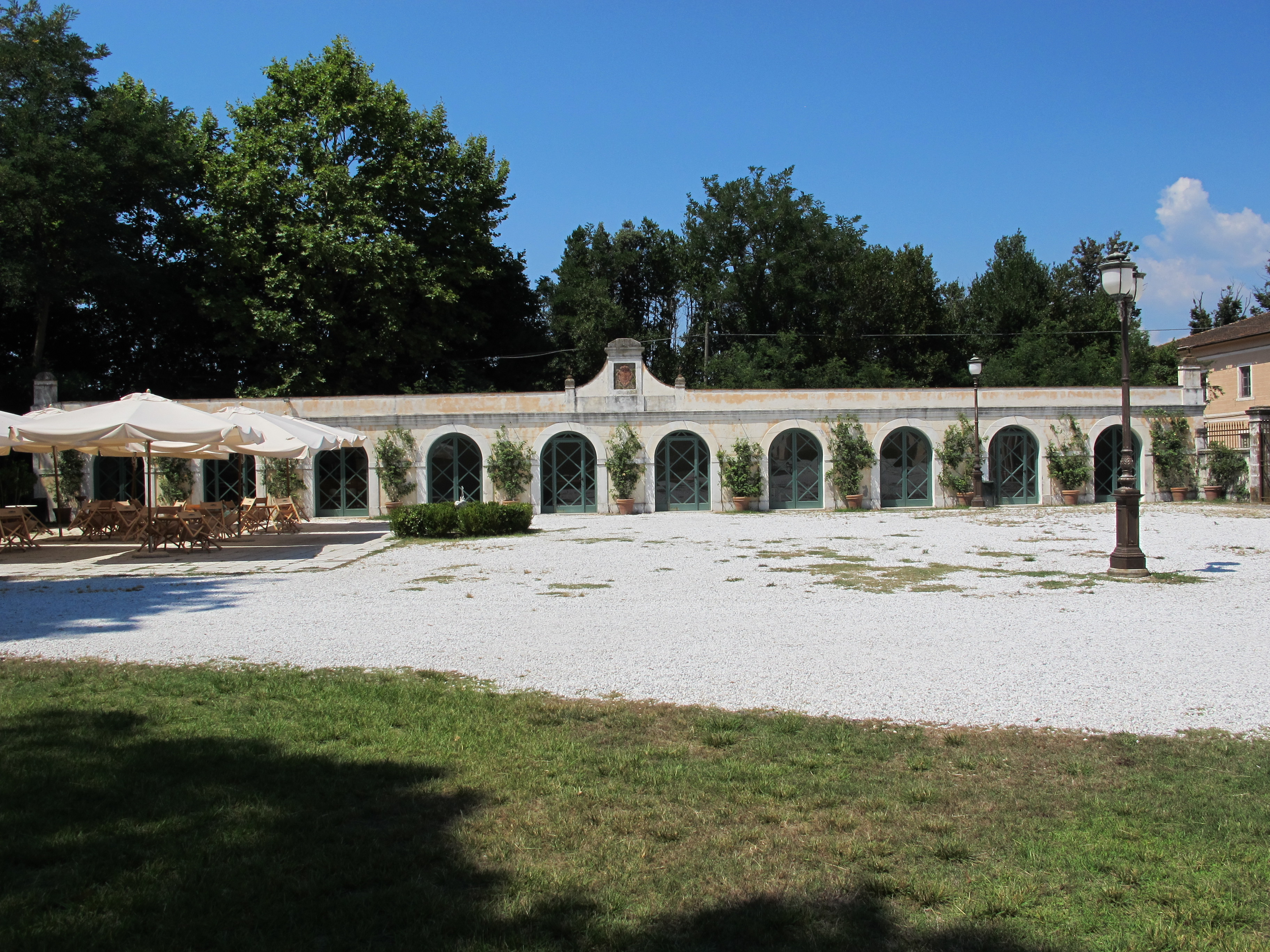
limehouse

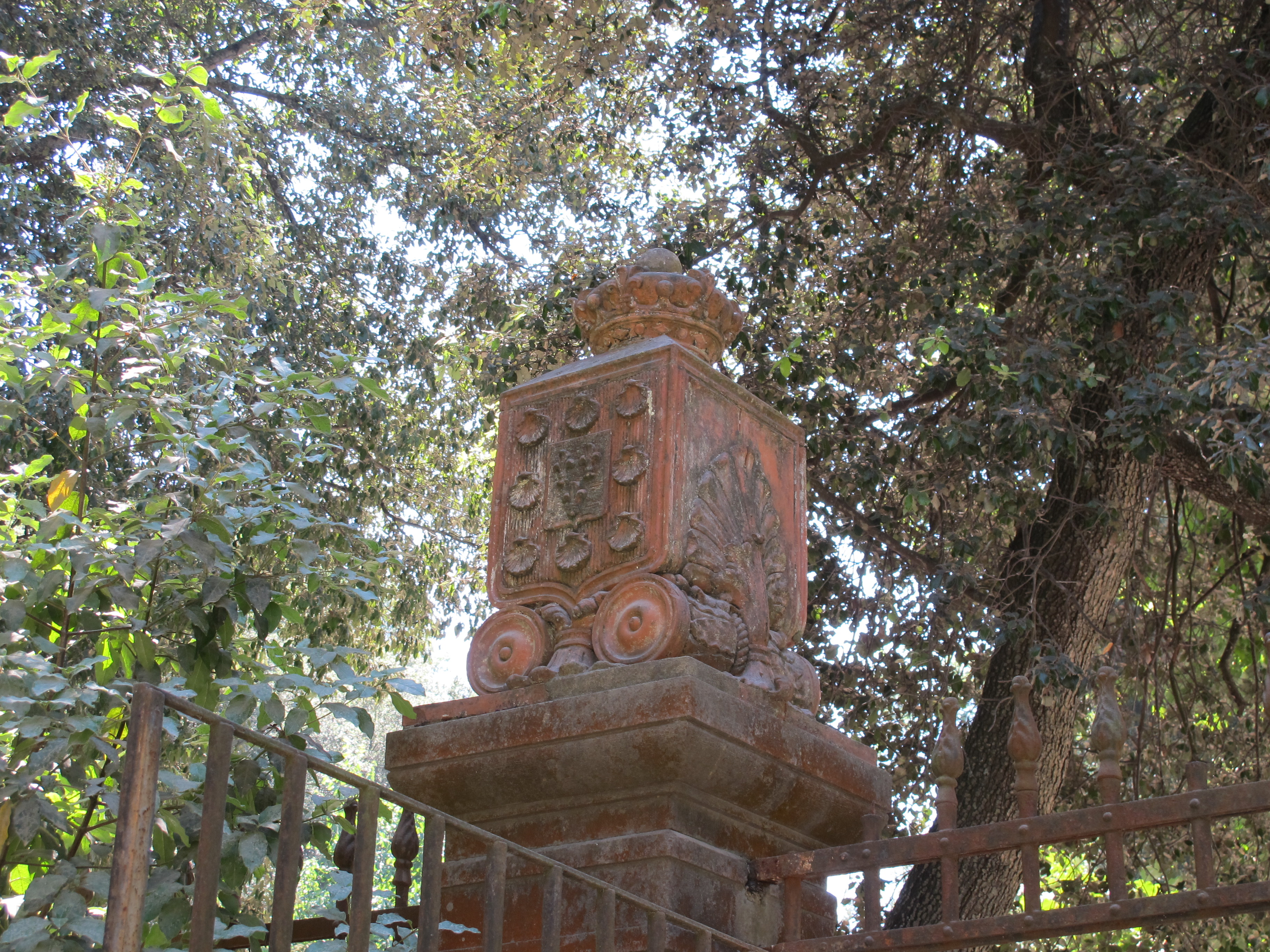
fence detail

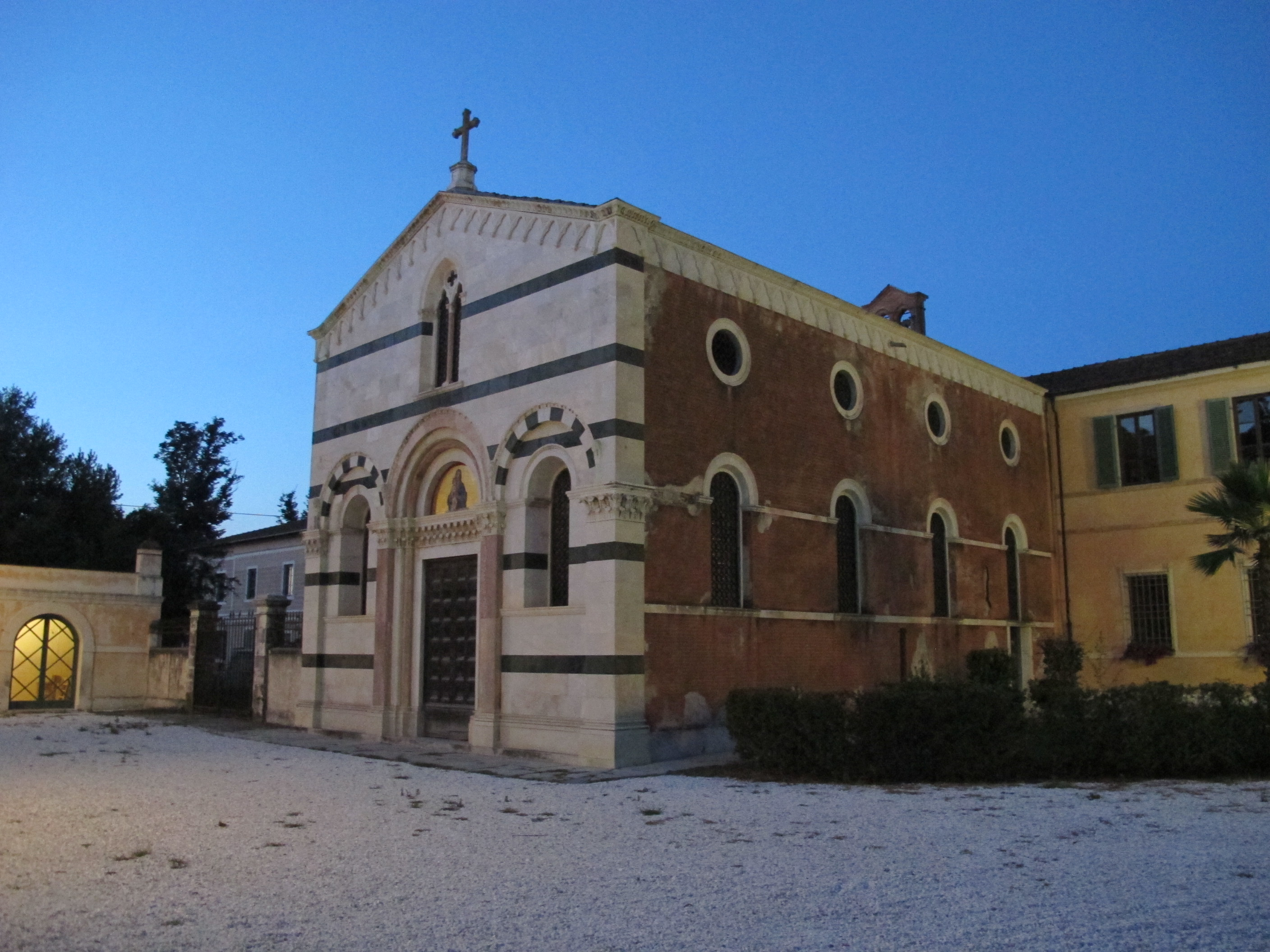
sepulchral chapel

== In literature ==
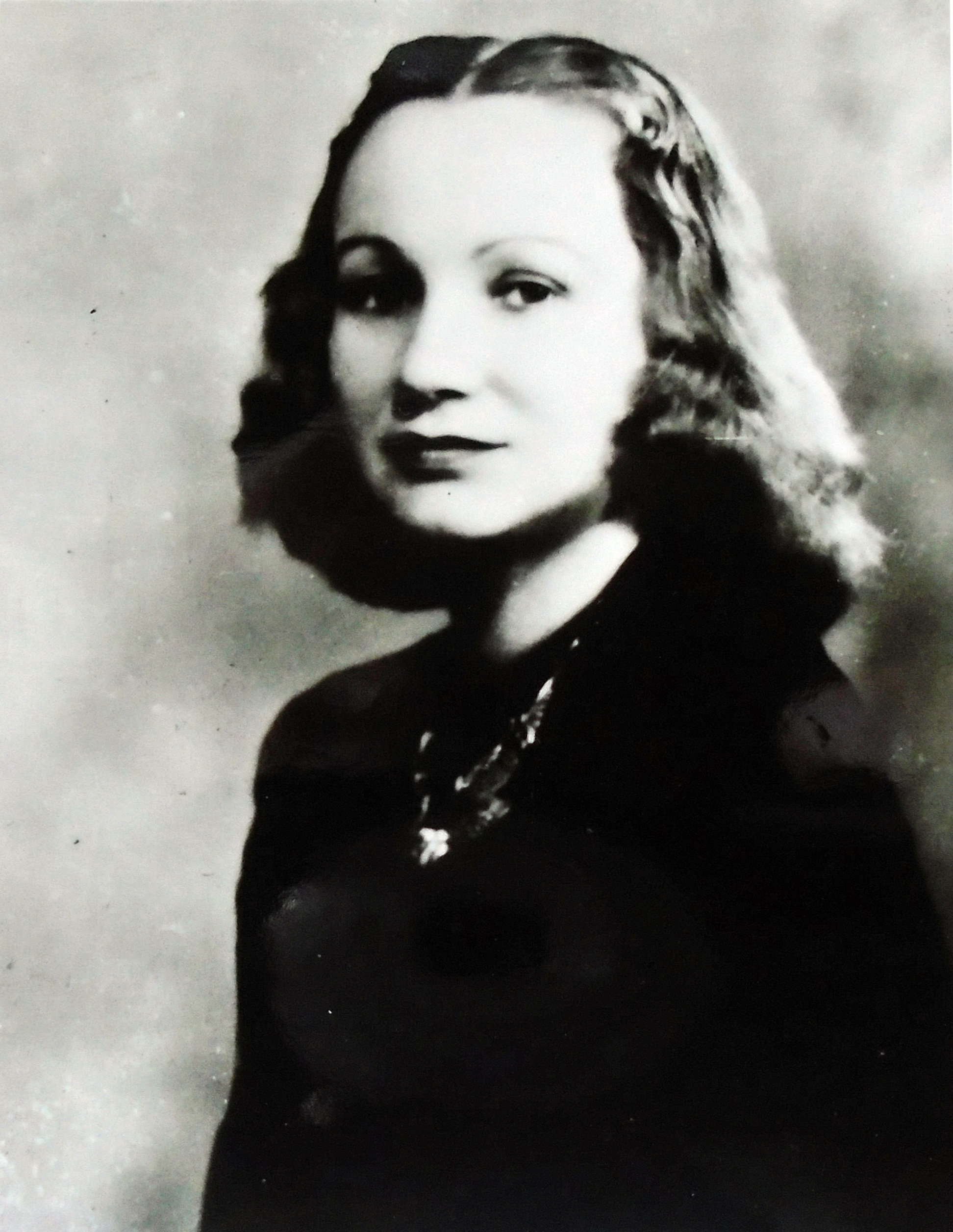
Bertita Harding

Tenuta Reale few times featured in literary works. In 1930 the Italian painter, novelist and Anarchist activist Lorenzo Viani published in Milan a novel Il figlio del pastore; it was a largely an autobiographical account from his youth, spent in Viareggio. Since in the late 19th century Viani's father was employed as domestico di fiducia at the estate and lived on the premises with his family, Lorenzo as a child used to meet princess Margherita, Carlos VII and their children. The novel – or recollections, depending upon how the work is categorized – provides a somewhat sympathetic picture of Villa Borbone inhabitants; presented as part of the disappearing old world, they are portrayed with a grade of melancholy. The work contains also numerous details, which shed some light upon reality of daily life at the estate.

In 1944 Bertita Harding, a German-born but Mexico-based author who specialized in biographies of European royals, published in New York The Lost Waltz. A Story of Exile. The book, formatted as a semi-narrative story, focuses on the offspring of Blanca de Borbón, and especially on Franz Josef; all members of the family are depicted in highly affectionate terms. Blanca (or "Mama") is presented as a brave widow, struggling against hardships of daily life; some reviewers grumbled that the author was somewhat too gentle with the Habsburgs. Numerous chapters of the work contain extensive paragraphs on family life in Tenuta Reale; they are mostly centred upon the period from the late 1920s until the mid-1940s.

In 1969 Ana de Sagrera (pen-name of Ana María Azpillaga Yarza), the Basque-Spanish author who wrote historiographic works focused on mostly female Spanish royals, published in Palma de Mallorca La Duquesa de Madrid (ultima reina de los carlistas). The book, written in semi-scientific popular format, was a biography of princess Margherita. Its final chapters are dedicated to the 1880s and the 1890s, the period when the protagonist lived in Villa Borbone. Despite somewhat confusing sub-title (the last universally Carlist-recognized queen was not princess Margherita, but princess Maria das Neves de Bragança), the work is referenced in scientific works as a trustworthy historiographic source on Margherita and episodes from the family life; some authors credit Sagrera for successful and innovative archival queries.

== See also ==
- House of Bourbon-Parma
- Parco naturale di Migliarino, San Rossore, Massaciuccoli
