= Archduchess Immaculata of Austria =

Archduchess of Austria and Princess of Tuscany

Archduchess Immaculata
- Patrizia di Siena
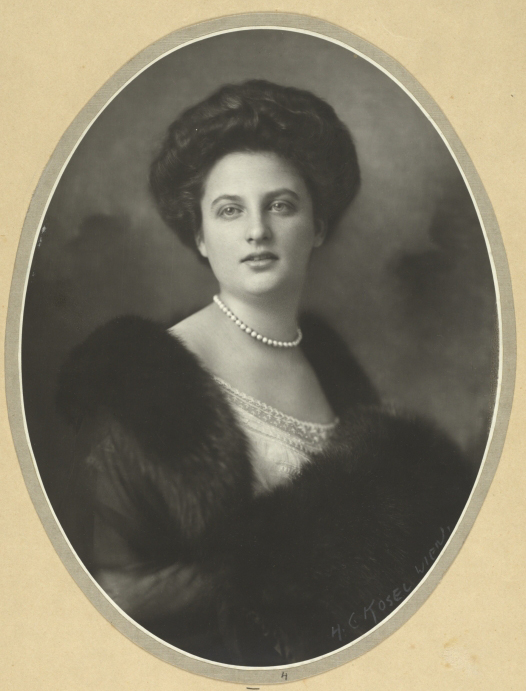
- Immaculata, circa 1915
- Born: 9 September 1892; Lemberg, Kingdom of Galicia and Lodomeria, Austria-Hungary
- Died: 3 September 1971 (aged 78); Viareggio, Italy
- Spouse: Nobile Igino Neri-Serner, Patrician of Siena (m. 1932)
Names
- German: Maria Immaculata Karoline Margarethe Blanka Leopoldine Beatrix Anna
- House: Habsburg-Tuscany
- Father: Archduke Leopold Salvator of Austria
- Mother: Princess Blanca of Bourbon

Archduchess Immaculata of Austria (German: Inmmaculata, Erzherzogin von Österreich-Toskana; 9 September 1892 – 3 September 1971) was a daughter of Archduke Leopold Salvator of Austria. She was member of the Tuscan branch of the Imperial House of Habsburg-Lorraine, an Archduchess of Austria and Princess of Tuscany by birth. After the dissolution of Austria-Hungary, she lived in exile, first in Barcelona and from the 1930s until the end of her life in Italy. In 1932, she married an Italian aristocrat, Igino Neri-Serneri. The couple remained childless.

== Early life ==
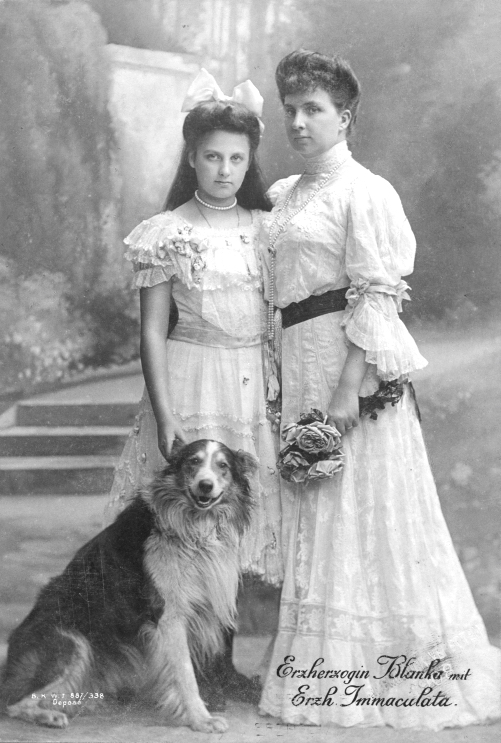
Archduchess Immaculata and her mother Blanca.

Archduchess Immaculata was born on 9 September 1892 at Lemberg, Galicia, then part of the Austro-Hungarian Empire. She was the second among the ten children of Archduke Leopold Salvator of Austria (1863–1931) and of his wife Princess Blanca of Bourbon (1868–1949). She was christened María Immaculata Karoline Margarethe Blanka Leopoldine Beatrix Anna. Called Mac within her family, she received the name Immaculata in honor of her paternal grandmother, Princess Maria Immaculata of Bourbon-Two Sicilies, who died in 1899.

Archduchess Immaculata grew up in the last period of the Habsburg monarchy. She was educated in splendor. Her father, who had followed a career in the Austro-Hungarian Army, was also an inventor with a number of military patents under his name. Her mother was the domineering force in the family. Theirs was a multi-cultural household. Immaculata's paternal ancestors had reigned in Austria, Tuscany and the Kingdom of the Two Sicilies. Princess Blanca's family had reigned in Spain, Parma, Modena, Portugal and France.

Archduchess Immaculata was educated with her sisters Dolores and Margaretha. The three sisters, very close in age, were artistically inclined. Immaculata was the intellectual of her family. Following Habsburg tradition, she was passionate about music, playing various instruments. She was an outstanding pianist. As well as her native German, she learned French, Spanish Hungarian and Italian. Immaculata was shy and reserved. The family was wealthy. They lived at the Palais Toskana in Vienna and at Schloss Wilhelminenberg as their country estate. Vacations were spent in Italy where Princess Blanca owned a rural property near Viareggio. During World War I, Archduke Leopold Salvator of Austria and the two eldest sons fought with the Austro-Hungarian army. Archduchess Immaculata served as a Red Cross nurse during the conflict.

== Exile ==
At the fall of Habsburg monarchy, the republican government of Austria confiscated the properties of the Habsburgs. The family lost all their fortune. Immaculata's two eldest brothers, Archdukes Rainer and Leopold, decided to remain in Austria and recognized the new republic. The rest of the family moved to Spain. In January, 1919 they arrived in Barcelona where they settled for over a decade. They lived very modestly. Initially they rented a house in which the girls shared a bedroom with their mother and the boys one with their father. The family's economy improved with income coming from revenue from Archduke Leopold Salvator of Austria's military patents. The political upheaval in Spain, during the Second Spanish Republic, made the family moved back to Austria. As a condition of their return to Vienna, they relinquished their royal titles. Their former residence, the Palais Toskana had been divided into apartments and the family were able to rent three rooms there.

Archduchess Immaculata did not remain in Austria for long. On 14 July 1932 in Rome, she married an Italian aristocrat, Nobile Igino Neri-Serneri, Patrician of Siena (22 July 1891 - 1 May 1950). The couple settled in Rome at Number 4 Via di Montoro. As the archduchess and her husband were both over forty, their marriage was childless. During World War II they stayed in Rome under increasingly difficult circumstances. After eighteen years of marriage, Igino Neri-Serneri died in 1950. In her widowhood, Archduchess Immaculata joined her sisters, Archduchesses Dolores and Margaretha, in Tenuta Reale, a villa they had inherited at the death of their mother the previous year. Archduchess Immaculata lived there until her death on 3 September 1971, at age 78.

== Ancestry ==
Ancestors of Archduchess Immaculata of Austria

8. Leopold II, Grand Duke of Tuscany
4. Archduke Karl Salvator of Austria, Prince of Tuscany
9. Princess Maria Antonia of the Two Sicilies
2. Archduke Leopold Salvator, Prince of Tuscany
10. Ferdinand II of the Two Sicilies
5. Princess Maria Immaculata of Bourbon-Two Sicilies
11. Maria Theresa of Austria
1. Archduchess Immaculata of Austria, Princess of Tuscany
12. Juan, Count of Montizón
6. Carlos, Duke of Madrid
13. Archduchess Maria Beatrix of Austria-Este
3. Infanta Blanca of Spain
14. Charles III, Duke of Parma
7. Princess Margherita of Bourbon-Parma
15. Princess Louise Marie Thérèse of France

== Bibliography ==
- Harding, Bertita. Lost Waltz: A Story of Exile. Bobbs-Merrill, 1944. ASIN: B0007DXCLY
- Mateos Sainz de Medrano. Ricardo. An Unconventional Family. Royalty Digest, Vol 4, N 1. July 1994.
- McIntosh, David. The Unknown Habsburgs. Rosvall Royal Books, 2000, ISBN 91-973978-0-6
