= Julius Weisbach =

German mathematician and engineer (1806–1871)

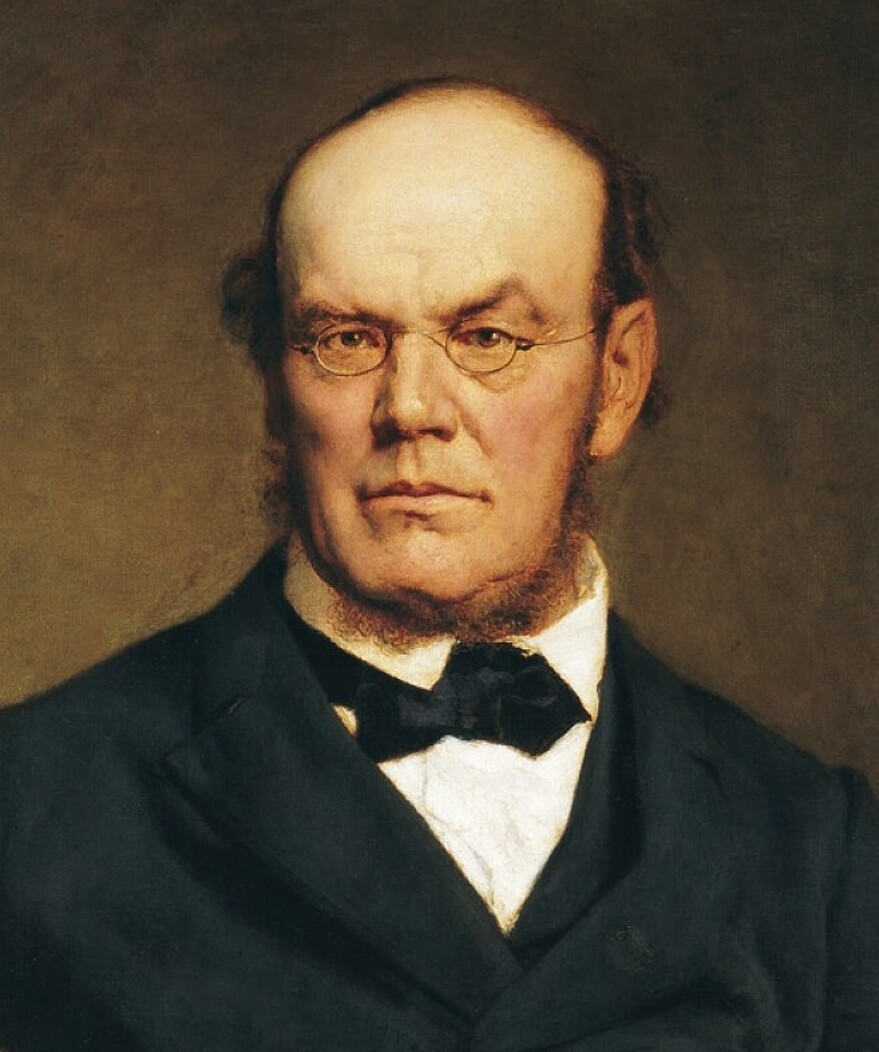
Portrait of Julius Ludwig Weisbach by the painter Johann Paul Kiessling (1836-1919)

Julius Ludwig Weisbach (10 August 1806 – 24 February 1871) was a German mathematician and engineer. He taught at the mining academy (Bergakademie) at Freiberg. He taught surveying, descriptive geometry, and mineral crystal measurement.

== Life and work ==
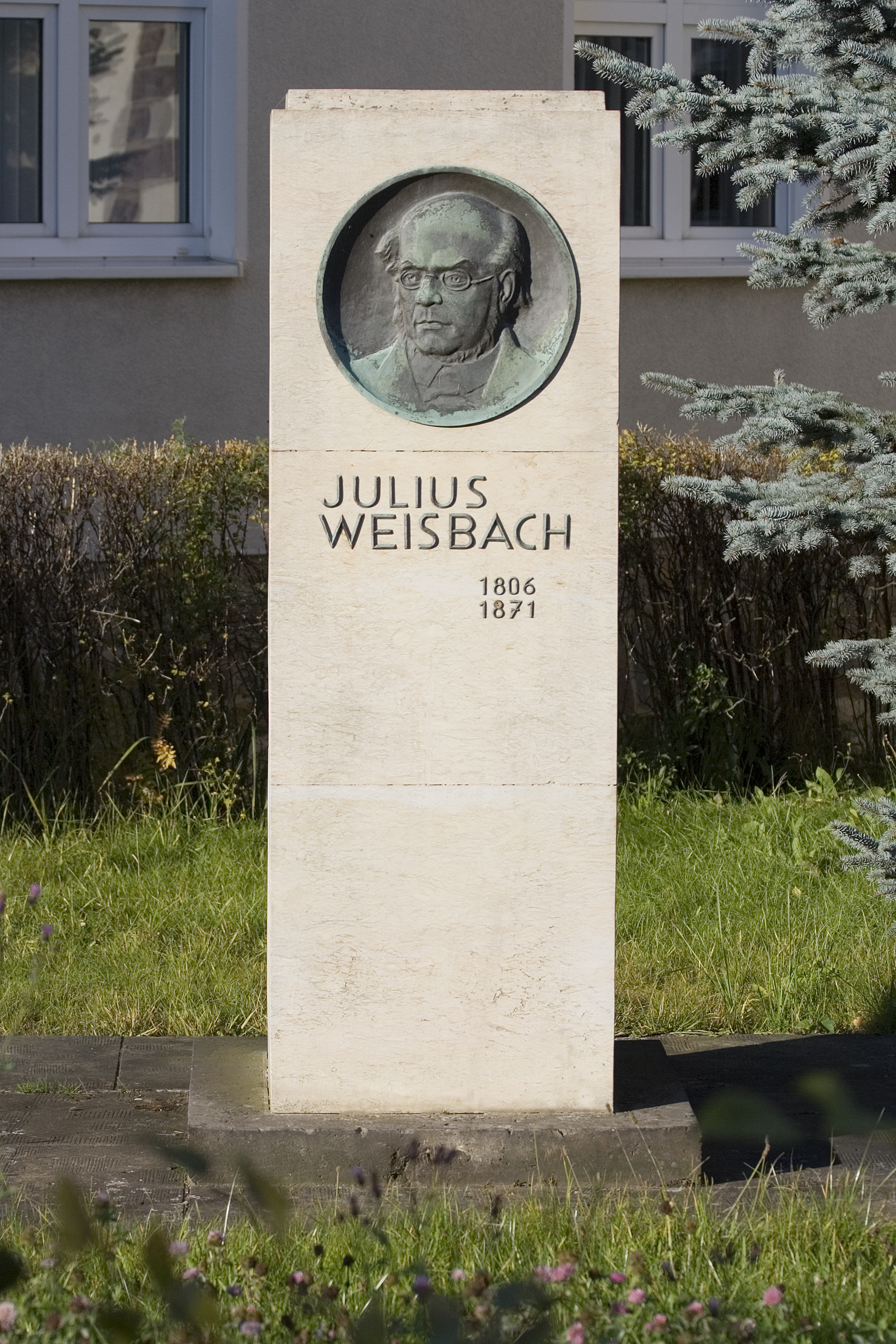
Monument to Weisbach in Freiberg

Weisbach was born on 10 August 1806 in Mittelschmiedeberg (now Mildenau municipality). His father was a foreman at a mill. He studied at a village school and then at Annaberg before going to the Bergakademie in Freiberg from 1822 to 1826. After that, he studied with Carl Friedrich Gauss in Göttingen and with Friedrich Mohs in Vienna.

In 1831 he returned to Freiberg where he worked as mathematics teacher at the local Gymnasium. In 1833 he became teacher for Mathematics and the Theory of Mountain Machines at the Freiberg Bergakademie. In 1836 he was promoted to Professor for applied mathematics, mechanics, theory of mountain machines and so-called Markscheidekunst. He was a popular teacher and taught field surveying methods, geometry and mathematical applications. Students were impressed by his ability to write simultaneously with both hands.

Weisbach wrote an influential book for mechanical engineering students, called Lehrbuch der Ingenieur- und Maschinenmechanik, which has been expanded and reprinted on numerous occasions between 1845 and 1863. Weisbach was the first to develop a method for solving orthogonal linear regression problems.

He examined the physics of steam engines, thermodynamics and mechanics. He took an interest in hydraulics and refined the Darcy equation into the still widely used Darcy–Weisbach equation. Gustav Zeuner (1828–1907) was one of his students.

In 1868 he was elected a foreign member of the Royal Swedish Academy of Sciences. He died on 24 February 1871 in Freiberg, at the age of 64.

== Family ==
His son Albin Weisbach became a professor of mineralogy. His daughter Maria Camilla Weisbach (1835–1908) met Edward Carl Hegeler (1835–1910) when he was studying with her father at Freiberg and later married him on 5 April, 1860. The couple settled in LaSalle, Illinois, where Hegeler had set up the Matthiessen-Hegeler Zinc Company. Their daughter Mary Hegeler, later Carus, was born on 10 January 1861, the first of ten children. Mary worked alongside her father as a young girl and was the first woman to graduate from the University of Michigan with a bachelor's degree in engineering in 1882. In 1885 she became the first woman to be legally enrolled to study at her grandfather's university, Bergakademie Freiberg, following a letter of recommendation from her cousin Clemens Winkler.

== Selected publications ==
- Handbuch der Bergmaschinenmechanik (2 Bde., 1835/1836)
- Lehrbuch der Ingenieur- und Maschinenmechanik (3 Bde., 1845/1863)
- Der Ingenieur, Sammlung von Tafeln, Formeln und Regeln der Arithmetik, Geometrie und Mechanik (1848)
- Die neue Markscheidekunst und ihre Anwendung auf die Anlage des Rothschönberger Stollns bei Freiberg (1851)
- Anleitung zum axonometrischen Zeichnen (1857)
