= Mary Hegeler Carus =

American engineer, editor and entrepreneur (1861–1936)

- Born: Marie Hermine Henriette Hegeler; January 10, 1861; La Salle, Illinois
- Died: June 27, 1936 (aged 75)
- Occupations: Engineer, business woman, entrepreneur, editor
- Employers: Matthiessen and Hegeler Zinc Company; Open Court Publishing Company
- Spouse: Paul Carus
- Father: Edward C. Hegeler
- Relatives: Julius Weisbach maternal grandfather; Clemens Winkler cousin

Mary Hegeler Carus (January 10, 1861 – June 27, 1936) was an American engineer, editor and entrepreneur. In 1882 she was the first woman to graduate in engineering from the University of Michigan.

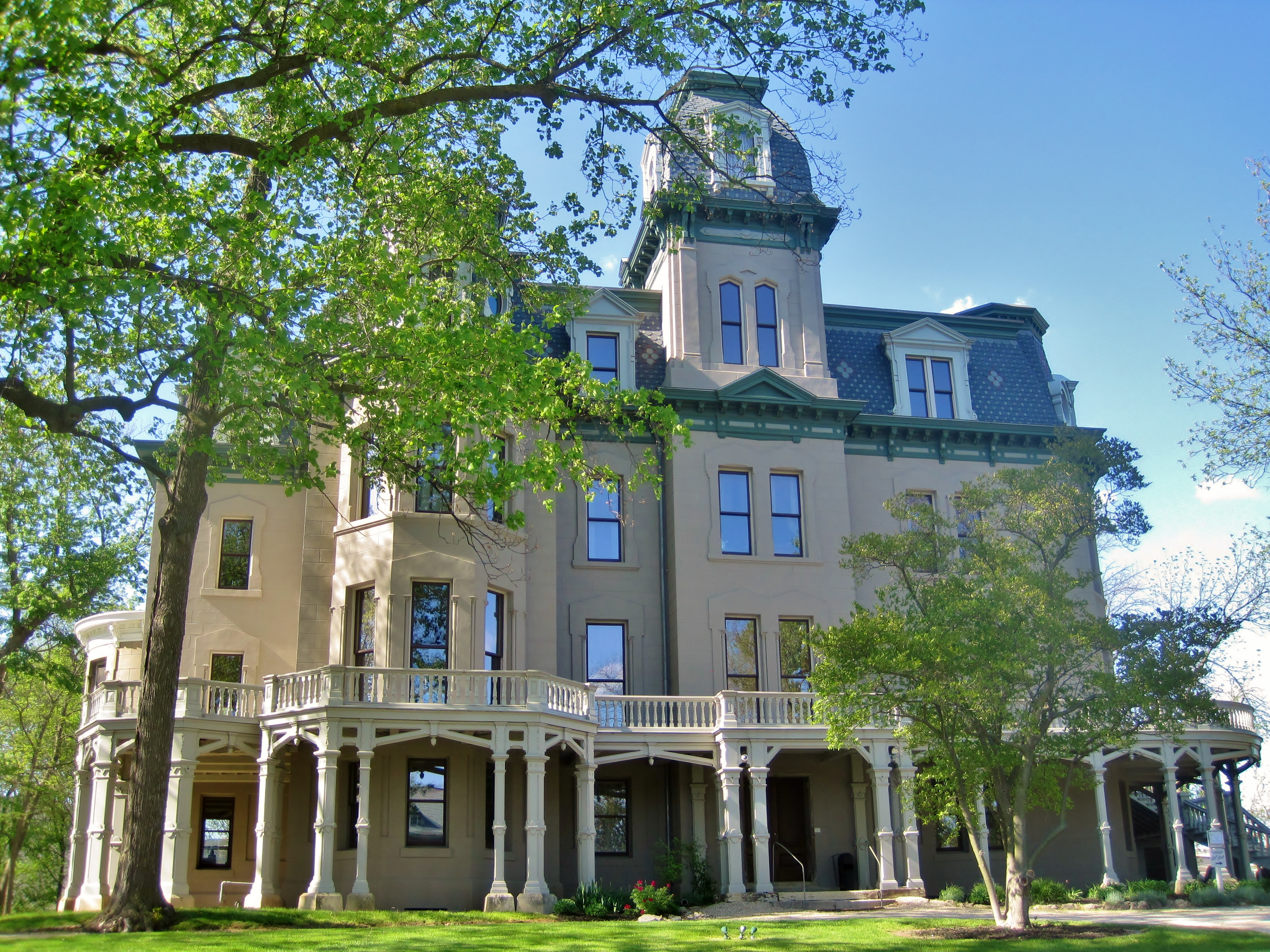
Hegeler-Carus Mansion the family home and headquarters of the publishing house The Open Court

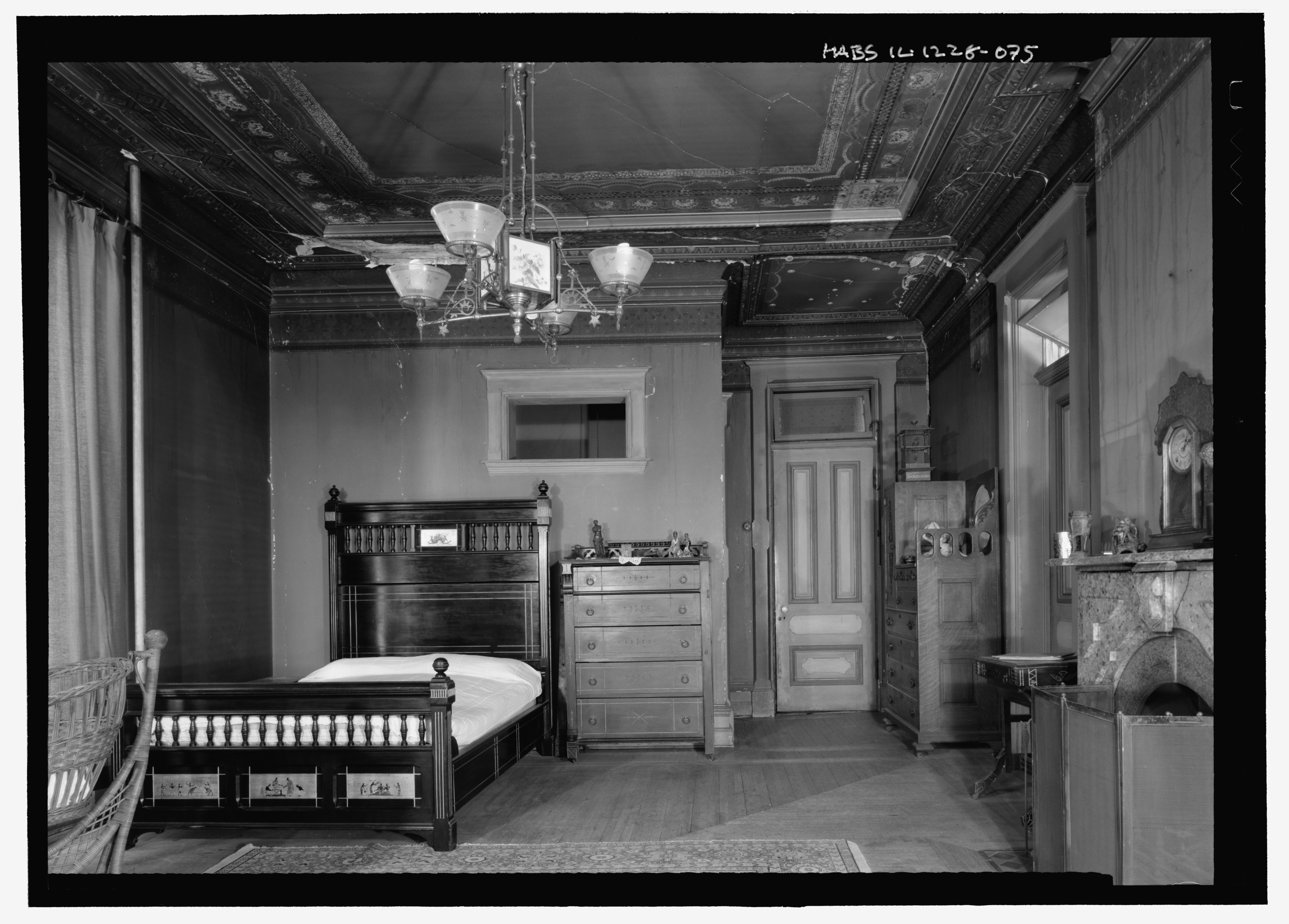
Mary Hegeler-Carus' second floor room at the Hegeler Carus Mansion

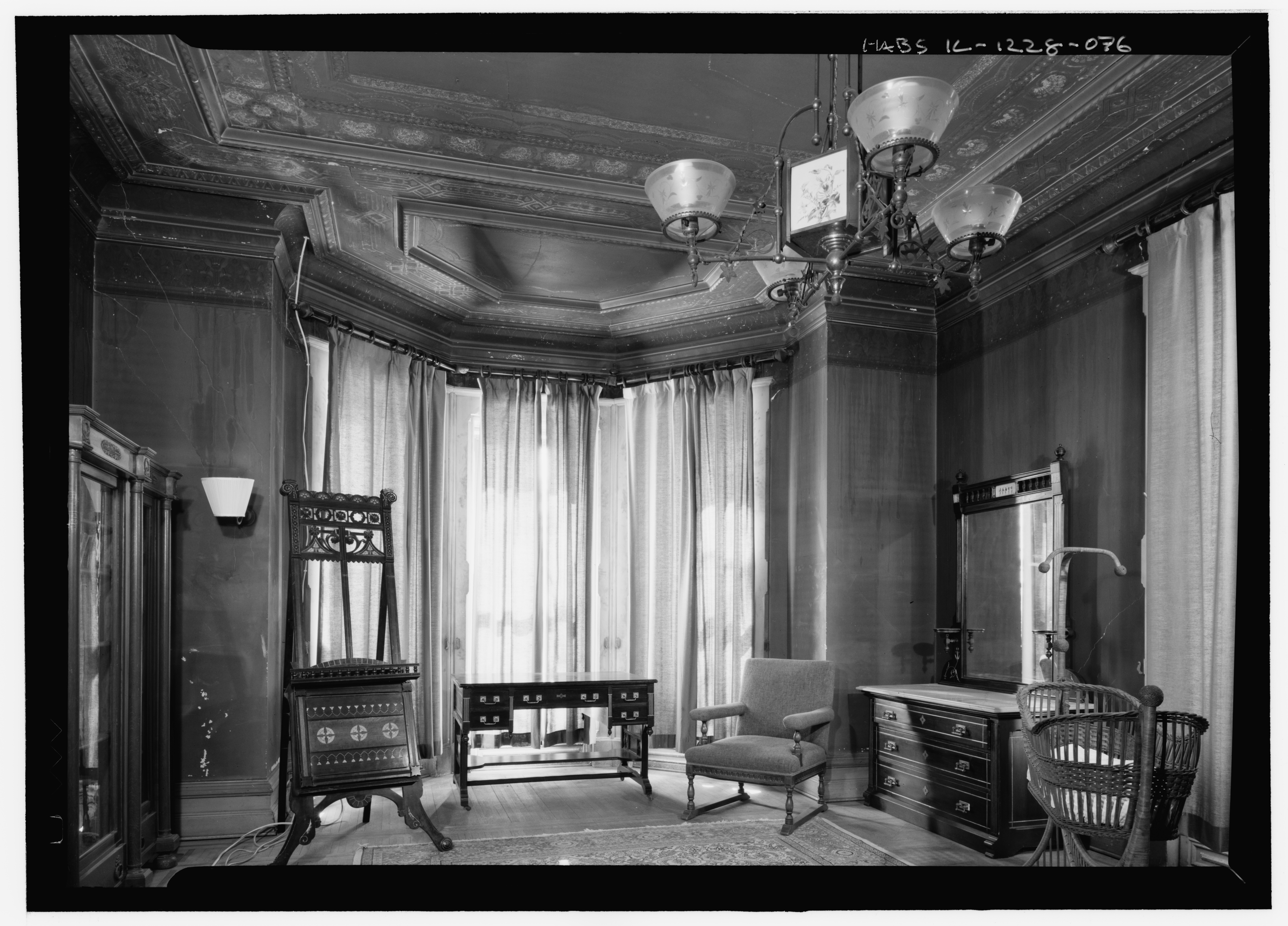
Mary Hegeler-Carus' room southern view at the Hegeler Carus Mansion

== Early life ==
Marie Hermine Henriette Hegeler was born on January 10, 1861, in La Salle, Illinois, the first of ten children born to German immigrants, Edward Carl Hegeler (1835–1910), and Camilla Weisbach Hegeler (1835–1908), daughter of Freiberg professor Julius Weisbach (1806–1871). The couple had met during Hegeler's studies at the Bergakademie Freiberg, and they married in 1860. Edward Carl Hegeler set up and ran the Matthiessen-Hegeler Zinc Company in La Salle with his college friend Frederick William Matthiessen. At one time the company was the largest producer of zinc in the US.

Mary Hegeler took the unusual step for a woman of her time period in pursuing a college career. She attended school at La Salle, and at the age of sixteen we find her working in the weigh-office of the zinc plant. She was interested in her father's zinc smelter and in how smelting furnaces worked. She was her father's constant companion in the works, becoming expert at reading the furnaces. Soon thereafter she entered the University of Michigan where she devoted her attention chiefly to mathematics and chemistry, graduating with the class of 1882. She then went over to her father's old home at Freiberg, attending lectures on metallurgy in the Mining Academy, and working in the laboratory of her uncle, the famous chemist Clemens Winkler.

== Education ==
She attended the University of Michigan and was the first woman to graduate from the university with a bachelor's degree in engineering in 1882.

In February 1885 she applied to study at the Bergakademie Freiberg. A letter of recommendation from her cousin Clemens Winkler ensured that her application was approved and she became the first woman to be legally enrolled. Mary Hegeler studied in Freiberg from April 1885 to Easter 1886, although she had to have a private laboratory because she was a woman. Although her academic performance was excellent, she was not allowed to officially graduate because she was a woman. Whilst she was a student in his laboratory, Winkler discovered and successfully isolated the element Germanium (Ge) in the mineral argyrodite.

== Career ==
In the summer of 1886 Hegeler returned to La Salle.

Aged 25, she became part of the management of her father's company, which now employed between 700 and 800 people. Edward Carl Hegeler increasingly devoted himself to his interests of religion and philosophy and founded the Open Court Publishing Company, a publishing house specialising in these subjects. He started The Open Court magazine in 1887 and The Monist in 1890. The editor-in-chief was the philosopher Paul Carus. Mary Hegeler married Carus on March 29, 1888.

In 1903 she became chairman of the board of the Matthiessen-Hegeler Zinc Company after her father became more concentrated on his work as a publisher. She prevented her brothers Julius and Herman's from selling the company whilst her father was on holiday.By 1903 she was Chief Executive and President of the company, although lost this role for a while after her father's death in 1910 due to family disagreements. From 1917 to 1933 she worked as company secretary and then became president for a second time between 1933 and her death in 1936. In 1924 she was involved in a buyout of the Matthiessen family, and guided the business through the Great Depression in the 1930s.

After the death of her husband in 1919, she took over the editing of The Open Court and The Monist. She published the Carus Lectures series and, in collaboration with the Mathematical Association of America, the Carus mathematical monographs series.

== Personal life ==
Mary Hegeler married Carus in 1888. Between 1889 and 1901, she gave birth to seven children. Her firstborn, Robert died at birth, but Edward (b. 1890), Gustave (b. 1892), Paula (b. 1894), Elisabeth or "Libby" (b. 1896), Herman (b. 1899), and Alwin (b. 1901) all lived long lives.

Mary Hegeler Carus died after a brief illness on June 27, 1936. She was buried in a casket made of the best zinc her family company could create.

== Commemoration ==
In 2012, TU Bergakademie Freiberg introduced the Mary Hegeler Scholarship, to be awarded annually to support young women scientists in their habilitation or post-doctoral work.
