= Open Court Publishing Company =

Publisher based in Chicago, Illinois

- Parent company: Carus Publishing Company
- Founded: 1887
- Founder: Edward Hegeler
- Country of origin: United States
- Headquarters location: Chicago
- Distribution: Publishers Group West
- Publication types: Books
- Nonfiction topics: Philosophy
- Official website: www.opencourtbooks.com

The Open Court Publishing Company is a publisher with offices in Chicago and LaSalle, Illinois. It is part of the Carus Publishing Company of Peru, Illinois.

== History ==
Open Court was founded in 1887 by Edward C. Hegeler of the Matthiessen-Hegeler Zinc Company, at one time the largest producer of zinc in the United States. Hegeler intended for the firm to serve the purpose of discussing religious and psychological problems on the principle that the scientific world-conception should be applied to religion. Its first managing editor was Paul Carus, Hegeler's son-in-law through his marriage to engineer Mary Hegeler Carus. For the first 80 years of its existence, the company had its offices in the Hegeler Carus Mansion.

Open Court specializes in philosophy, science, and religion. It was one of the first academic presses in the country, as well as one of the first publishers of inexpensive editions of the classics. It also published the journals Open Court and The Monist—the latter is still being published. The Open Court Monthly Magazine's motto was "Devoted to the Science of Religion, the Religion of Science, and the Extension of the Religious Parliament Idea".

== The Open Court ==
The journal The Open Court was founded in February 1887 as the official publication of the Free Religious Association. By the end of 1887, its editor Benjamin F. Underwood resigned and Paul Carus became editor. The Open Court Publishing Company published The Open Court until 1936. Carus edited the journal for 32 years, until his death.

== Popular Culture & Philosophy series ==
One of Open Court Publishing's best-selling series is its semi-annual Popular Culture & Philosophy series, under the editorship of George Reisch. Volumes on the philosophy underpinning such television shows as Star Trek, Seinfeld, The Simpsons, and Buffy the Vampire Slayer propelled the series into the limelight.

== See also ==
- Open Court Reading
