= Paul Carus =

American philosopher

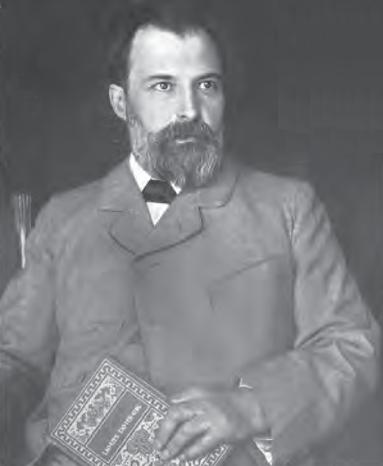
Paul Carus

Paul Carus (German: [ˈpaʊl ˈkaːʁʊs]; 18 July 1852 – 11 February 1919) was a German-American author, editor, philosopher, and student of comparative religion.

== Life and education ==
Carus was born in Ilsenburg and attended the Stettin Gymnasium where he studied mathematics under Hermann Grassmann. He later studied at the universities of Strassburg (then Germany, now France) and Tübingen, Germany. After obtaining his PhD from Tübingen in 1876 he served in the army and then taught school. He had been raised in a pious and orthodox Protestant home, but gradually moved away from this tradition.

He left Bismarck's Imperial Germany for the United States, "because of his liberal views". After he emigrated to the United States (in 1884) he lived in Chicago, and in LaSalle, Illinois. Paul Carus married Edward C. Hegeler's daughter, engineer Mary Hegeler (Marie) and the couple later moved into the Hegeler Carus Mansion, built by her father. They had seven children, the firstborn, Robert died at birth, but Edward (b. 1890), Gustave (b. 1892), Paula (b. 1894), Elisabeth or "Libby" (b. 1896), Herman (b. 1899), and Alwin (b. 1901) all lived long lives. Mary ran the family business, Matthiessen-Hegeler Zinc Company and the Open Court business and later took on the editorial role after Carus's death, alongside their daughter Elizabeth.

== Career ==
In the United States, Carus briefly edited a German-language journal and wrote several articles for the Index, the Free Religious Association organ.

Soon after, he became the first managing editor of the Open Court Publishing Company, founded in 1887 by his father-in-law. The goals of Open Court were to provide a forum for the discussion of philosophy, science, and religion, and to make philosophical classics widely available by making them affordable.

He also acted as the editor for two periodicals published by the company, The Open Court and The Monist.

He was introduced to Charles Sanders Peirce, the founder of American Pragmatism, by Judge Francis C. Russell of Chicago. Carus stayed abreast of Peirce's work and would eventually publish a number of his articles.

During his lifetime, Carus published 75 books and 1500 articles, mostly through Open Court Publishing Company. He wrote books and articles on history, politics, philosophy, religion, logic, mathematics, anthropology, science, and social issues of his day. In addition, Carus corresponded with many of the greatest minds of the late 19th and early 20th century, sending and receiving letters from Leo Tolstoy, Thomas Edison, Nikola Tesla, Booker T. Washington, Elizabeth Cady Stanton, Ernst Mach, Ernst Haeckel, John Dewey, and many more.

Carus died in La Salle, Illinois.

== Philosophy ==
Carus considered himself a theologian rather than a philosopher. He referred to himself as "an atheist who loved God".

Carus is proposed to be a pioneer in the promotion of interfaith dialogue. He explored the relationship of science and religion, and was instrumental in introducing Eastern traditions and ideas to the West. He was a key figure in the introduction of Buddhism to the West, sponsoring Buddhist translation work of D. T. Suzuki, and fostering a lifelong working friendship with Buddhist Master, Soyen Shaku. Carus's interest in Asian religions seems to have intensified after he attended the World's Parliament of Religions in 1893.

For years afterwards, Carus was a strong sympathizer of Buddhist ideas, but stopped short of committing fully to this, or any other, religion. Instead, he ceaselessly promoted his own rational concept, which he called the religion of science. Carus had a selective approach and he believed that religions evolve over time. After a battle for survival, he expected a "cosmic religion of universal truth" to emerge from the ashes of traditional beliefs.

Carus proposed his own philosophy similar to panpsychism known as 'panbiotism', which he defined as "everything is fraught with life; it contains life; it has the ability to live."

Carus was a follower of Benedictus de Spinoza; he was of the opinion that Western thought had fallen into error early in its development in accepting the distinctions between body and mind and the material and the spiritual. (Kant's phenomenal and noumenal realms of knowledge; Christianity's views of the soul and the body, and the natural and the supernatural.) Carus rejected such dualisms, and wanted science to reestablish the unity of knowledge. The philosophical result he labeled Monism.

His version of monism is more closely associated with a kind of pantheism, although it was occasionally identified with positivism. He regarded every law of nature as a part of God's being. Carus held that God was the name for a cosmic order comprising "all that which is the bread of our spiritual life." He held the concept of a personal God as untenable. He acknowledged Jesus Christ as a redeemer, but not as the only one, for he believed that other religious founders were equally endowed with similar qualities.

His beliefs attempted to steer a middle course between idealistic metaphysics and materialism. He differed with metaphysicians because they "reified" words and treated them as if they were realities, and he objected to materialism because it ignored or overlooked the importance of form. Carus emphasized form by conceiving of the divinity as a cosmic order. He objected to any monism which sought the unity of the world, not in the unity of truth, but in the oneness of a logical assumption of ideas. He referred to such concepts as henism, not monism.

Carus held that truth was independent of time, human desire, and human action. Therefore, science was not a human invention, but a human revelation which needed to be apprehended; discovery meant apprehension; it was the result or manifestation of the cosmic order in which all truths were ultimately harmonious.

== Criticisms ==
It is claimed that Carus was dismissed by Orientalists and philosophers alike because of his failure to comply with the rules of either discipline.

== Legacy ==
The legacy of Paul Carus is honored through the efforts of the Hegeler Carus Foundation, the Carus Lectures at the American Philosophical Association (APA), and the Paul Carus Award for Interreligious Understanding by the Council for a Parliament of the World's Religions (CPWR). Mary Hegeler Carus and their daughter Elizabeth Carus took on the editorial role after Carus's death.

== Bibliography ==
His publications include:

- The Open Court Fortnightly Journal Vol 1 1887–1888
- The Soul of Man: An Investigation of the Facts of Physiological and Experimental Psychology (1891, republished 2006) ISBN 1-4286-1359-5
- Monism: Its Scope and Import (1891)
- Homilies of Science (The Open Court Publishing Co., 1892)
- The Religion of Science (1893, republished 2007) ISBN 1-4304-4286-7
- Truth in Fiction: Twelve Tales with a Moral (1893)
- The Philosophy of the Tool (1893)
- The Gospel of Buddha (1894) ISBN 0-87548-228-7
- Buddhism and Its Christian Critics (1894, republished 2005) ISBN 0-7661-9140-0; 1905, new & revised edition
- Goethe and Schiller's Xenions. Translated by Carus, Paul. Chicago: Open Court Publishing Company. 1896 – via Internet Archive.
- The Ethical Problem (1899, republished 2005) ISBN 1-4212-7343-8
- The History of the Devil and the Idea of Evil (1900) ISBN 0-517-15064-6
- Eros and Psyche: A Fairy-Tale of Ancient Greece, Retold After Apuleius (1900)
- Kant's Prolegomena to Any Future Metaphysics. Translated by Carus, Paul. Chicago: Open Court Publishing Company. 1902 – via Internet Archive.
- Fundamental Problems; The Method of Philosophy as a Systematic Arrangement of Knowledge (1903)
- The Surd of Metaphysics (1903)
- The Nature of the State (1904)
- Kant and Spencer; A Study of the Fallacies of Agnosticism (1904)
- Karma: A Story of Buddhist Ethics (1903, republished 2004) ISBN 0-7661-9172-9
- Primer of Philosophy (1906)
- Story of Samson and Its Place in the Religious Development of Mankind (1907, republished 2003) ISBN 0-7661-3877-1
- The Rise of Man: A Sketch of the Origin of the Human Race ISBN 1-4179-5157-5 (1907, republished 2004)
- The Bride of Christ: A Study In Christian Legend Lore (1908)
- The Foundations of Mathematics (1908, republished 2004) ISBN 1-59605-006-3
- GOD: An Enquiry into the Nature of Man's Highest Ideal and a Solution of the Problem from the Standpoint of Science (1908, republished 2007) ISBN 1-60206-390-7
- The Philosopher's Martyrdom; A Satire (1908)
- Godward; a Record of Religious Progress (1908)
- The Pleroma: An Essay on the Origin of Christianity (1909)
- Philosophy as a Science: A Synopsis of the Writings of Paul Carus (1909)
- Buddhist Hymns: Versified Translations from the Dhammapada and Various Other Sources (1911)
- The Philosophy of Form (1911, republished 2007) ISBN 1-4304-9402-6
- The Mechanistic Principle and the Non-Mechanical: An Inquiry into Fundamentals With Extracts from Representatives of Either Side (1913) ISBN 0-912050-69-1
- The Principle of Relativity in the Light of the Philosophy of Science (1913, republished 2004) ISBN 0-7661-9185-0
- Nietzsche and Other Exponents of Individualism (1914, republished 2007) ISBN 1-4325-2343-0
- Goethe, with Special Consideration of His Philosophy (1915)

== See also ==
- American philosophy
- Necessitarianism
