= Rösler =

Rösler may refer to the following:

Rösler as a family name

- Antonio Rosetti (c. 1750–1792) (born Franz Anton Rösler), classical era composer and double bass player
- Colin Rösler (born 2000), Norwegian footballer
- Hans Jürgen Rösler (1920–2009), German mineralogy professor
- Herbert Rösler (1924-2006), German artist
- Jeannine Rösler (born 1970), German politician
- Martha Rosler (born 1943), American artist
- Margit Rösler (born 1962), German mathematician
- Philipp Rösler (born 1973), Vietnamese-born German politician
- Sascha Rösler (born 1977), German footballer
- Uwe Rösler (born 1968), German football player and manager

Other Roesler

- Roesler, a red Austrian wine grape.
