= Julius W. Hegeler I House =

Historic house in Illinois, United States

- U.S. National Register of Historic Places
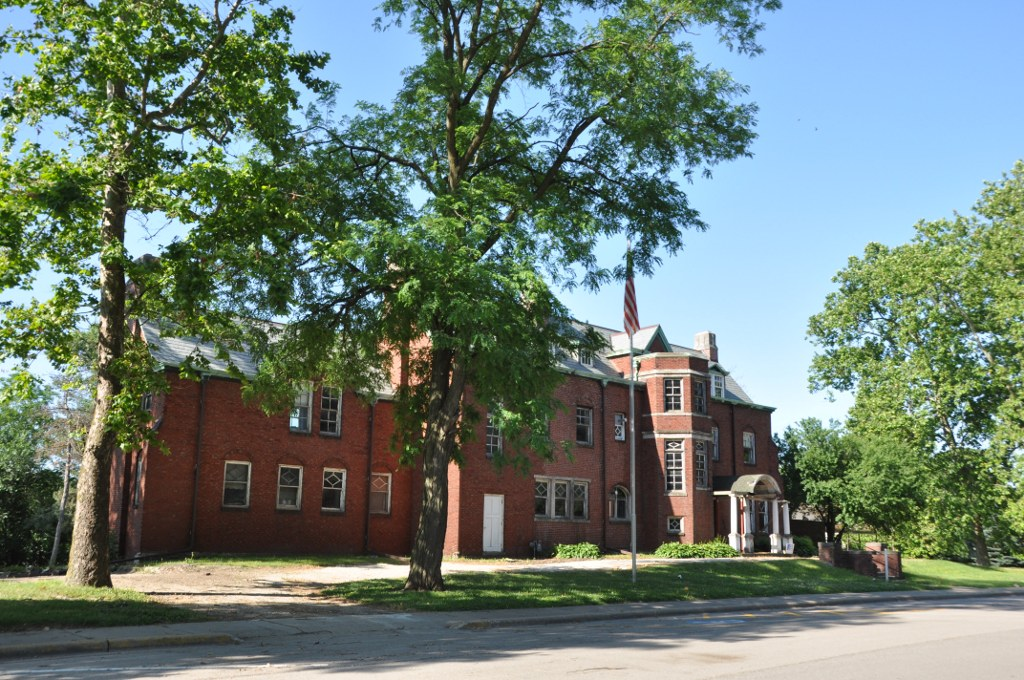

- Location within Illinois Location within the United States
- Location: 1306 Seventh St., LaSalle, Illinois
- Coordinates: 41°20′6″N 89°5′13″W
- Area: 1.8 acres (0.73 ha)
- Built: 1904
- Architect: Pond & Pond
- Architectural style: Bungalow/craftsman
- NRHP reference No.: 09000028
- Added to NRHP: February 18, 2009

The Julius W. Hegeler I House is a historic building in LaSalle, Illinois, United States. Completed in 1904, the house was designed by Pond & Pond and is an excellent local example of Arts & Crafts architecture.

== History ==
Julius W. Hegeler I was the eldest son of Edward C. Hegeler, who established a prosperous zinc smelting operation in LaSalle, Illinois. Born in 1867, Julius Hegeler studied mining engineering and joined the family business in his adulthood. He married Josephine Hulda Caesar in 1897 and had four children. In 1903, Hegeler received a 1 3/4-acre (0.71 ha) plot of land from his father, across the street from the Hegeler Carus Mansion.

Hegeler commissioned Pond & Pond, a leading firm in the Arts & Crafts style to design the house. It was designed in 1902 and completed in 1904, although the Hegelers only lived there for a year. In late 1905, they moved to Danville so that Hegeler could establish his own zinc smelting company with his brother Herman. Pond & Pond also designed a house for Herman, but it was demolished around 1950.

The Hegeler house remained in the hands of the family until 1970. Edward T. Barnes owned the house for a decade starting in 1922 and Herman D. Carus lived there from 1945 to 1969. In 1970, the house became a meeting place for the Illinois Valley Community Arts Center. At times, the LaSalle County Youth Bureau and a local YMCA chapter also used the building. In 1984, Fred and Cynthia Carus took ownership of the house and it remained unused for twenty years. The Hegeler Carus Foundation, a non-profit organization that oversees the mansion across the street, purchased the house and restored its roof. The house was recognized by the National Park Service with a listing on the National Register of Historic Places on February 18, 2009.
