= Frederick William Matthiessen =

American philanthropist and industrialist

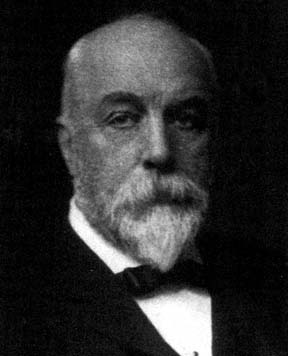
- Born: March 5, 1835; Altoona, Duchy of Holstein
- Died: February 11, 1918 (aged 82); LaSalle, Illinois
- Resting place: Oakwood Cemetery, LaSalle, Illinois
- Education: Freiberg University of Mining and Technology
- Spouse: Fannie Clara Möeller Matthiessen
- Children: 5

Frederick William Matthiessen (March 5, 1835 – February 11, 1918) was a philanthropist, industrialist, and mayor of LaSalle, Illinois. He was instrumental in the creation of Matthiessen State Park. Matthiessen was the paternal grandfather of scholar and Harvard professor F.O. Matthiessen.

== Early life and education ==
Born March 5, 1835 in Altona, which was then under Danish control as part of the Duchy of Holstein. Matthiessen went on to attend university at the Freiberg University of Mining and Technology. It was here that he met Edward C. Hegeler, a fellow engineering student studying mining. They immigrated together to the United States of America in 1856. After investigating several sites in the Northeast and Midwest of the country, they decided to set up their smelter on the banks of the Little Vermilion River, in LaSalle, IL.

== Business success ==
Matthiessen and Hegeler Zinc Works broke ground on Christmas Eve of 1858. The early years of the Matthiessen and Hegeler Zinc Company were difficult, with the Civil War breaking out 2 years after the company's inception. A lack of demand for zinc very nearly ended the company, but troubles proved to be short lived. By 1862, a burgeoning arms industry injected much-needed business, greatly driving up demand for zinc products. Matthiessen would later add rolling mills, coal mines, machine shops, and the forerunner of Westclox to his diverse portfolio.

Edward's daughter, Mary Hegeler Carus, ran Matthiessen and Hegeler Zinc Company from 1903 until her death in 1936. In 1924, the Hegeler-Carus family bought out the Matthiessen family interests in the company.

Matthiessen served as the mayor of LaSalle, IL between 1887 and 1897, elected to five consecutive terms.

== Philanthropy ==
Matthiessen donated approximately $500,000 to various causes, such as LaSalle-Peru High School and Illinois Valley Community Hospital. Perhaps his best known donation is his former estate and private park known as "Deer Park". It is today known as Matthiessen State Park.
