= Hegeler Carus Mansion =

Historic house in Illinois, United States

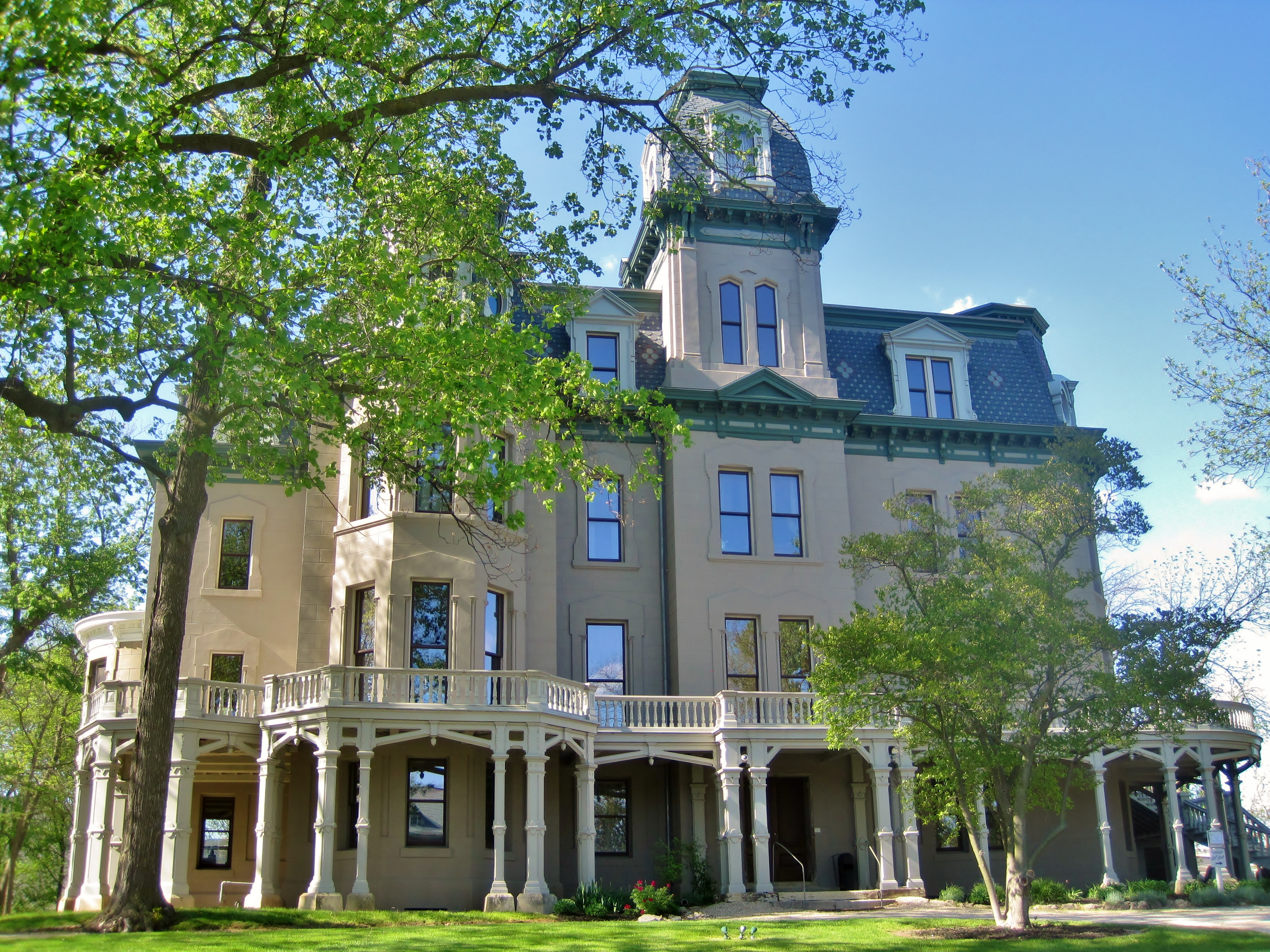
- Interactive map of the Hegeler Carus Mansion area

General information
- Status: Under Restoration
- Architectural style: Second Empire
- Completed: 1876
- Owner: Hegeler Carus Foundation

Design and construction
- Architects: William W. Boyington, et al.; Fiedler, A.
- Main contractor: Edward C. Hegeler
- Hegeler-Carus Mansion
- U.S. National Register of Historic Places
- U.S. National Historic Landmark
- Location within Illinois Location within the United States
- Location: LaSalle, Illinois
- Coordinates: 41°20′9.5″N 89°5′13.6″W
- Built: 1874
- NRHP reference No.: 95000989

Significant dates
- Added to NRHP: August 9, 1995
- Designated NHL: March 29, 2007

The Hegeler Carus Mansion, located at 1307 Seventh Street in La Salle, Illinois is one of the Midwest's great Second Empire structures. Completed in 1876 for Edward C. Hegeler, a partner in the nearby Matthiessen Hegeler Zinc Company, the mansion was designed in 1874 by noted Chicago architect William W. Boyington. The mansion is now owned and operated by the Hegeler Carus Foundation, and is open to the public. It was designated a National Historic Landmark in 2007.

== History ==
Boyington, the architect who designed the mansion, is noted for the Chicago Water Tower, the Joliet State Penitentiary, and for completing the Illinois State Capitol. The interior was done by August Fiedler, who designed a unique parquet floor and hand-painted ceiling for each public room. The mansion, which has seven levels, has 57 rooms with a total of about 16,000 square feet of interior space.

The Hegeler Carus Mansion was initially home to Hegeler, his wife Camilla Hegeler, and their large family. In 1887, Hegeler launched the Open Court Publishing Company to provide a forum for the discussion of philosophy, science and religion, and hired the German scholar Dr. Paul Carus to serve as managing editor. The company was located on the first level of the house. In 1888, Carus married Hegelers’ daughter Mary Hegeler, who had worked alongside her father as a young girl and was the first woman to graduate from the University of Michigan with a bachelor's degree in engineering in 1882. The couple had seven children, six living to adulthood and raised them in the mansion.

The mansion is where Carus wrote over 70 books, countless articles and served as editor of two scholarly publications, The Open Court and The Monist. Carus invited editorial contributions from the likes of Charles Sanders Peirce, William James, Leo Tolstoy, F. Max Müller, Gottlob Frege and Bertrand Russell. Carus hosted a historical meeting of East and West immediately after the 1893 Chicago Columbian Exposition, bringing together eminent Oriental religious scholars. This led to Open Court's publishing program emphasizing classics of eastern religious thought. Zen scholar D. T. Suzuki spent 11 years in La Salle working with Carus on this programme.

Mary Hegeler Carus took over running the Matthiessen Hegeler Zinc Company from her father and also ran part of Open Court, eventually taking over as editor with Carus' death.

Paul Carus died in 1919, and Mary lived in the house until her death in 1936. The house was occupied mainly by their children. In 2001, its sole resident was 99-year-old Alwin Carus, one of six children of Paul and Mary, who died in 2004.

== Recent developments ==
In 1995, the Hegeler Carus Foundation was created. That year, the mansion was put on the National Register of Historic Places. In recent years, members of the Carus family and others have done much restoration of the mansion. On March 29, 2007, the Hegeler Carus Mansion was designated a National Historic Landmark.

In 2008, the foundation launched a project to reassemble the mansion's gymnasium and its apparatus, considered to be a unique surviving example of a late 19th-century turnverein-style physical culture facility. The foundation also owns the Julius W. Hegeler I House, located directly across the street, which is undergoing restoration.

In celebration of the 2018 Illinois Bicentennial, Hegeler Carus Mansion was selected as one of the Illinois 200 Great Places by the American Institute of Architects Illinois component (AIA Illinois).

== Current uses ==
The mansion hosts numerous public programs, and is open for public tours. It is particularly notable for its high Victorian stencils and wall and ceiling paintings, its woodwork, and its history.
