= The Gospel of Buddha =

1894 book by Paul Carus

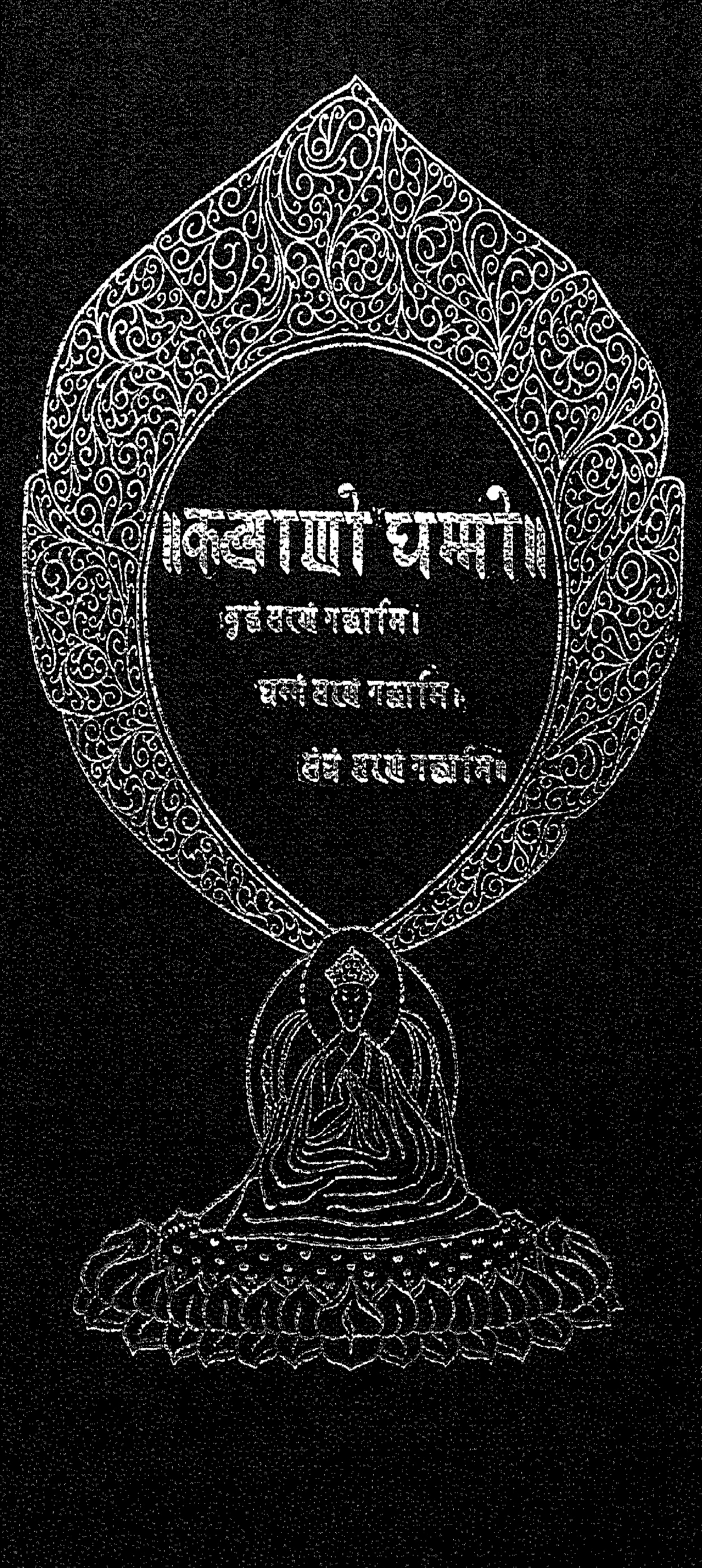
- 1917 cover by Olga Kopetzky
- Author: Paul Carus
- Language: English
- Published: 1894
- Text: The Gospel of Buddha at Wikisource

The Gospel of Buddha is an 1894 book by Paul Carus. It is modeled on the New Testament and tells the story of Buddha through parables. It was an important tool in introducing Buddhism to the west and is used as a teaching tool by some Asian sects.

Carus believed that the modern world required a new Religion of Science. By the 1890s, inspired by the meetings and conversations at the Parliament of the World's Religions in 1893, he had decided that Buddhism was the closest faith to his ideal and created The Gospel of Buddha to popularize the religion in the West.

The work was assembled from existing English translations of Buddhists texts, with significant amendments and reworkings. His selection of texts favoured Buddhism as a philosophy without any supernatural elements. While criticized by contemporary scholars, this interpretation proved popular in the West, leading to a number of reprintings. It also influenced the development of Modern Buddhism in the 18th century in East Asia, notably in a Japanese translation of the book by D. T. Suzuki.
