= Hal Cherne =

American football player (1907–1983)

Profile
- Position: Offensive lineman

Personal information
- Born: March 7, 1907; LaSalle, Illinois
- Died: January 31, 1983 (age 75)

Career information
- College: DePaul

Career history
- 1933: Boston Redskins
- Stats at Pro Football Reference

Harold Thomas Cherne (March 7, 1907 – January 31, 1983) was an American football offensive lineman in the National Football League for the Boston Redskins. He played college football at DePaul University.
