= Albin Weisbach =

German mineralogist (1833–1901)

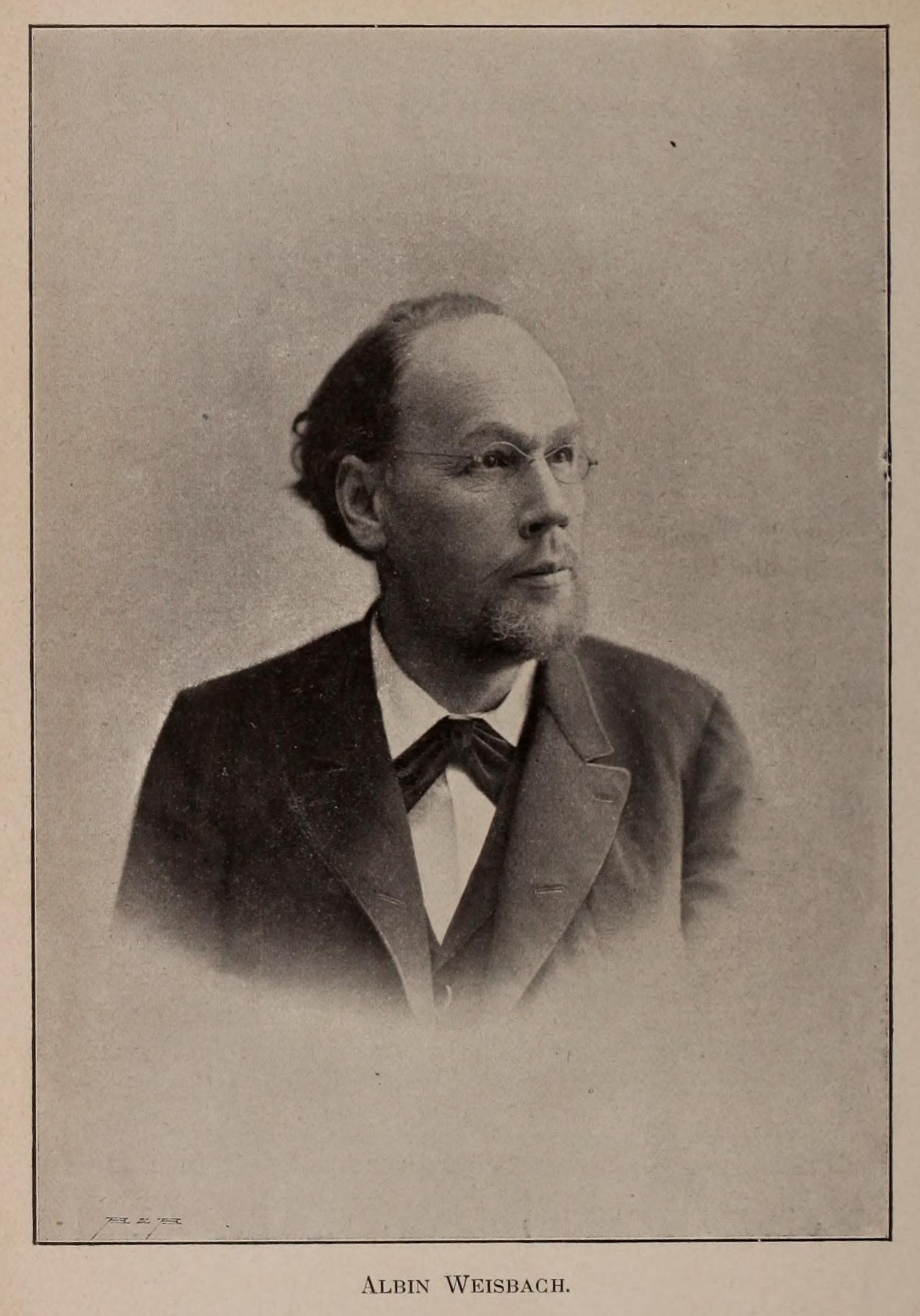

Albin Weisbach (6 December 1833 – 26 February 1901) was a German mineralogist and professor of mineralogy at the mining academy at Freiberg. He studied various minerals and described and named several including trögerite, walpurgin, zeunerite, rbagite, titanium zonite, uranospinite, uranocircite, cobalt spar, arnimite and argyrodite.

== Life and work ==
Weisbach was born in Freiberg, son of professor Julius Weisbach and Marie née Winkler. He grew up in a circle of mining professors and became interested in minerals. He joined the Freiberg Gymnasium in 1842 and went to the mining academy in 1850. His favorite teacher was Ferdinand Reich. He then went to Göttingen and Paris, studying metallurgy and in 1824 he returned to Freiberg as an inspector. In 1827 he taught physics, from 1830 petrification, and chemistry from 1842. He became a senior metallurgical assayer in 1856. August Breithaupt became a guide and close friend. He learned crystallography from his father and received a doctorate from Heidelberg in 1857 with a dissertation on the monstrosities of tesseral crystal forming minerals. He began to teach mineralogy and became professor of mineralogy in 1866 following the retirement of Breithaupt.

Weisbach married Lea, née Schwamkrug and they had four children. He suffered from a cardiac arrest and moved to the sanatorium at Naunhof near Leipzig, where he died.

== Writings ==
- Über die Monstrositäten tesseral kristallisierender Mineralien. Freiberg 1858
- Tabellen zur Bestimmung der Mineralien mittels äußerer Kennzeichen. Leipzig 1866
