= Hans Jürgen Rösler =

German mineralogist

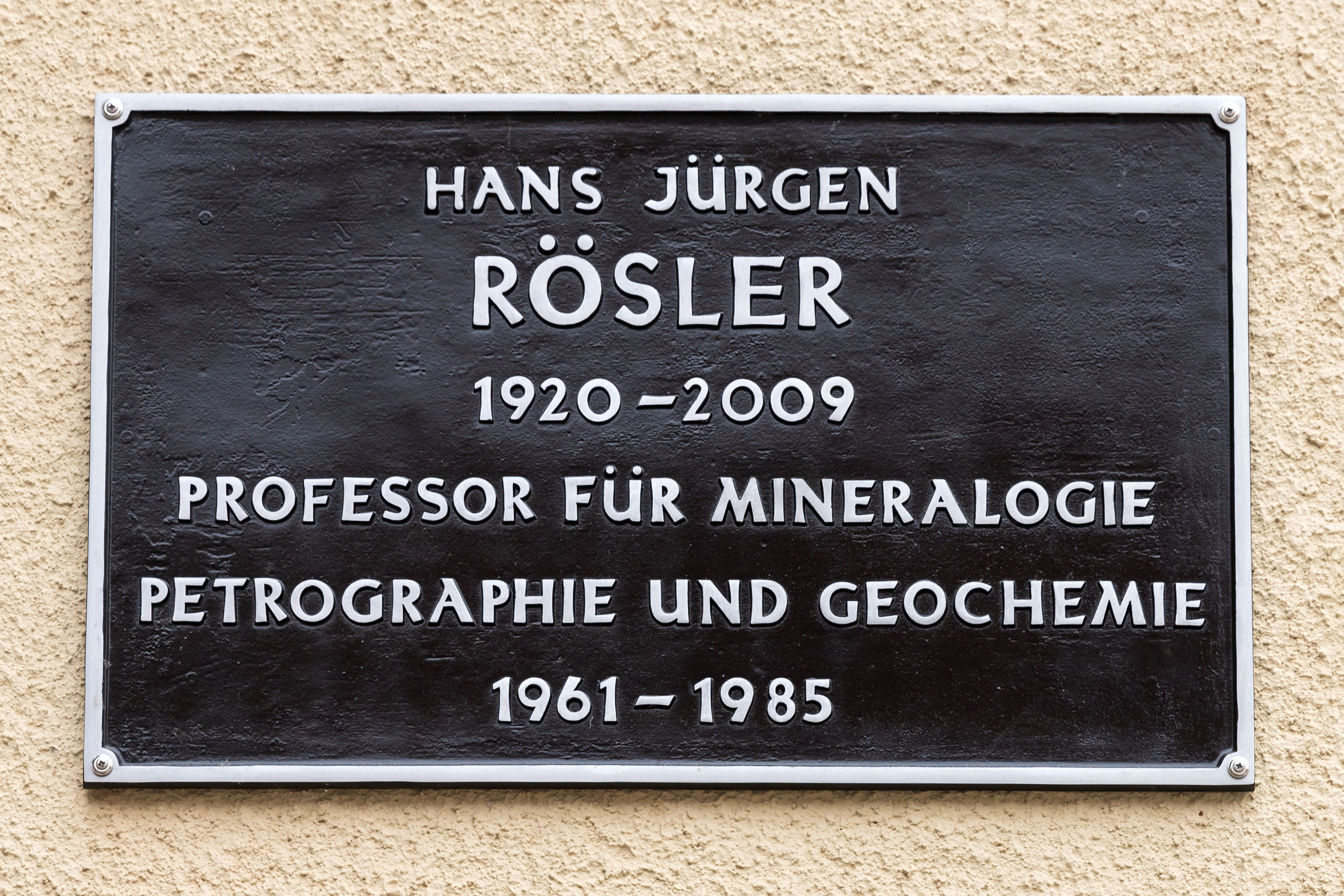
- Memorial plaque for Hans Jürgen Rösler at the Institute for Mineralogy in Freiberg
- Born: 14 May 1920; Braschen, Brandenburg, Prussia
- Died: 12 January 2009 (aged 88); Freiberg, Saxony, Germany
- Occupations: Mineralogist university professor
- Political party: Socialist Unity Party of Germany

Academic background
- Education: Freiberg University of Mining and Technology

Hans Jürgen Rösler (14 May 1920 – 12 January 2009) was a German mineralogy professor. He was the author of a wide range of publications and core teaching texts, including "Geochemische Tabellen" ("Geochemical Tables") and "The Mineralogy Textbook" ("Lehrbuch der Mineralogie").

== Biography ==
Rösler was born in Braschen, a small village in Eastern Brandenburg (since 1945 part of Poland). His father was a teacher. He attended school in Crossen and then in Frankfurt (Oder), where in 1938 he passed his school final examinations (Abitur). During 1939 he undertook a mining internship in Silesia. However, in 1939 war had returned. He was conscripted and served as a soldier in France and the Soviet Union between 1940 and 1944. This was followed by a three-year period, between 1944 and 1947, as a prisoner of war, which in Rösler's case involved mining work in Morocco. Following that it was no longer possible to return home due to the border changes and the industrial-scale ethnic cleansing that had been a feature of the closing part of the war which had ended in defeat for Germany, victory for the Soviet Union, and a westward shift for Poland, formally in May 1945. Instead he moved to Freiberg, in the heart of the Saxony mining region, and here he embarked on a lengthy period of study at the local Mining Academy. His subject was Mineralogy. The doctorate which he received in 1954 was the result of a piece of work submitted on the geochemistry of Lignite ("brown coal").

In 1959 he became the head of the Institute for Chemistry and Mineralogy at what was then the Freiberg Mining Academy (today the Freiberg University of Mining and Technology). Mining was important to the economy in the southern part of what had, since October 1949, been the German Democratic Republic: Rösler built and nurtured the Mineralogy Institute in the socio-political context of the East Germany, creating an institution of international renown.

In 1981 Rösler was made a full member of the Leipzig based Saxonian Academy of Sciences and Humanities, and in 1985 an honorary senator of the Freiberg Mining Academy. In 1986 he was honoured with the Serge von Bubnoff Medal. On 11 October 1996 he won the Kurt Schwabe Prize.
