= Matthiessen State Park =

State park in Illinois, US

- IUCN category III (natural monument or feature)
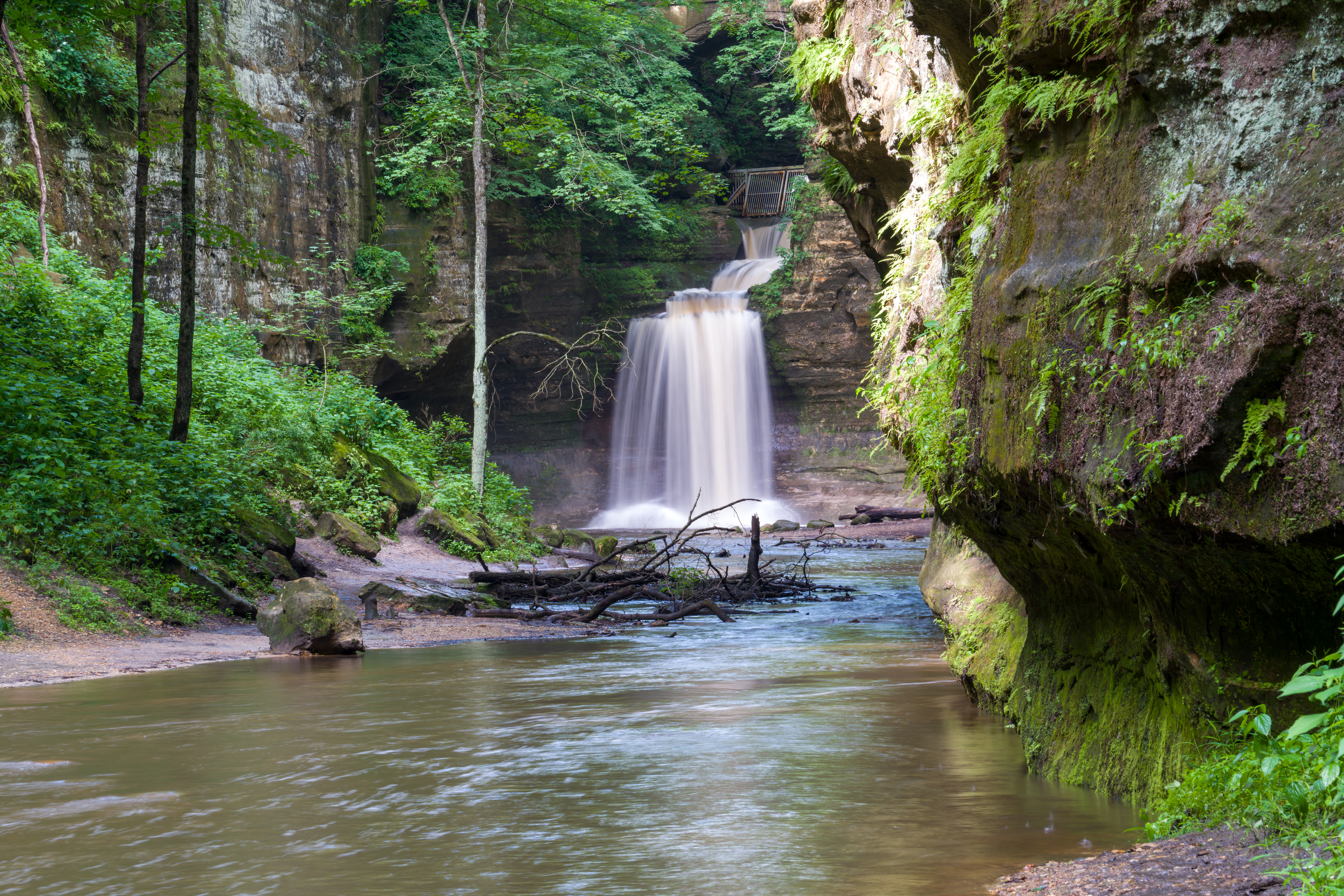
- Lower Dells Falls

- Location within Illinois Location within the United States
- Location: Deer Park, LaSalle County, Illinois, United States
- Nearest city: Oglesby, Illinois
- Coordinates: 41°17′44″N 89°01′31″W
- Area: 1,700 acres (6.9 km^{2})
- Established: 1943
- Governing body: Illinois Department of Natural Resources
- Website: dnr.state.il.us/lands/Landmgt/PARKS/R1/mttindex.htm

Matthiessen State Park is an Illinois state park located a few miles south of the more famous Starved Rock State Park. The main entrances to both parks are located on Illinois State Route 178.

== History ==
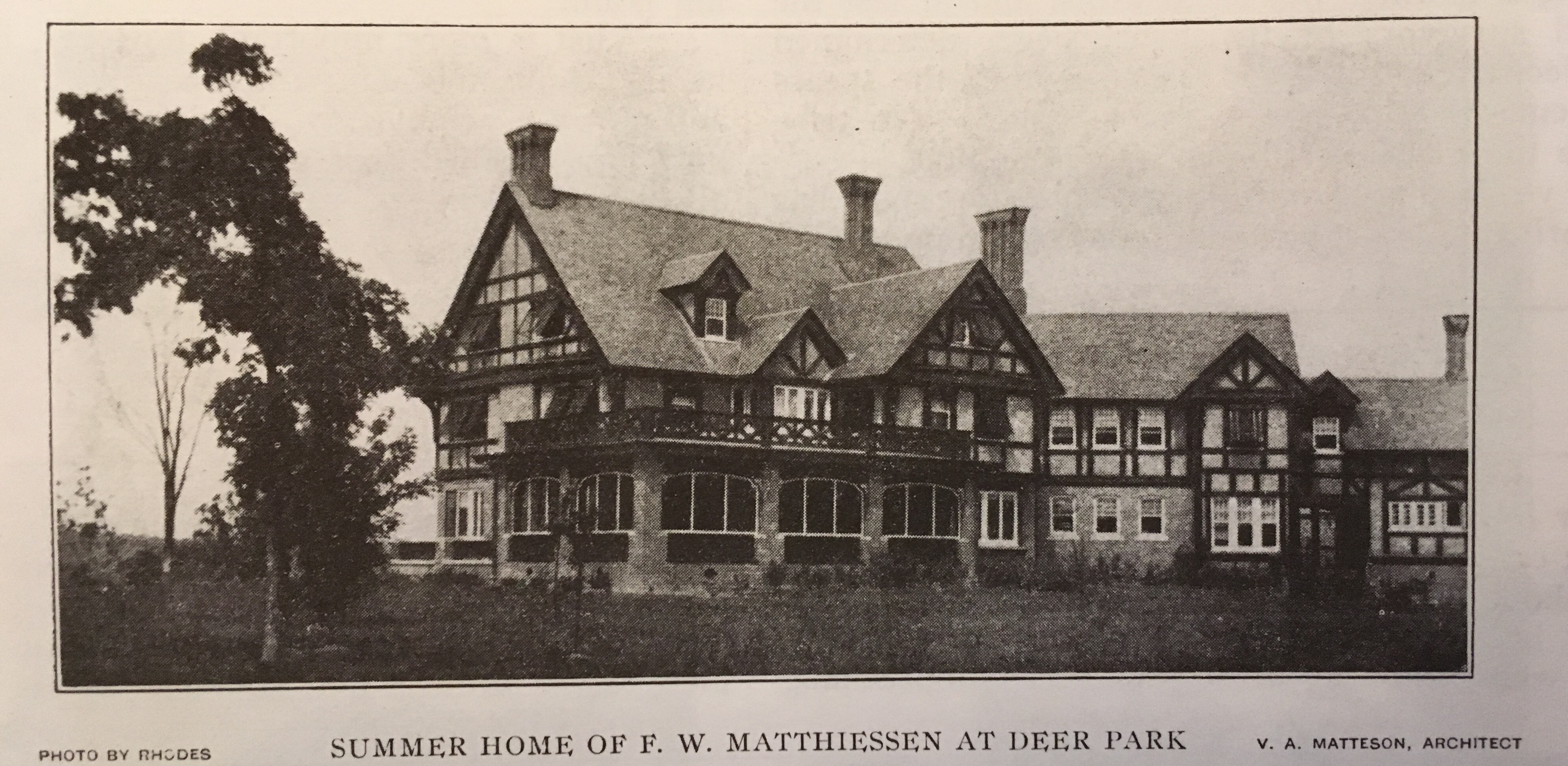
Home of Frederick William Matthiessen at Deer Park, designed by Victor Andre Matteson.

The park is near Oglesby, in LaSalle County, Illinois, United States. It is named for Frederick William Matthiessen, who had originally owned the 176 acres (71 ha) of property that is at the core of the current park. Two mansions, several cottages, a garage, and a private fire station were built here by Matthiessen for his family. It was an estate that hosted a private park known as "Deer Park". The park was donated to Illinois by Matthiessen's heirs, following his death in 1918, and was renamed in his honor in 1943. Since then, land was added, growing the park to 1,938 acres (784 ha). The last building of the former estate was destroyed in 1981, although some of the concrete stairs leading into the canyon are of the original construction.

== Geology ==
The park is centered on a stream that flows from Matthiessen Lake to the Vermilion River. The stream has eroded partway through the sandstone layers, leaving interesting rock formations and drops. The Upper Dells begin at Matthiessen Lake with the Lake Falls, which drop into the canyon below, and continue downstream to the 45-foot-tall (14 m) Cascade Falls where the Lower Dells begin. The interesting coloration of many of the canyons is the result of minerals in the groundwater. Many mineral springs exist throughout the park, providing salt lick spots for the large deer population.

== Flora and fauna ==
=== Flora ===
The cool and damp canyons provide an ideal habitat for many species of mosses, liverworts, and ferns. On top of the bluffs that form the canyons can be found black oak (Quercus velutina), red cedar (Juniperus virginiana), and white oak (Quercus alba) trees, which thrive in the sandy soil. The park contains several species generally found farther north, such as the Canada yew (Taxus canadensis) and Canada mayflower (Maianthemum canadense).

=== Fauna ===
Frogs, toads, and salamanders live on the canyon floors, while bird species such as the cliff swallow nest in the eroded canyon walls. As the former name of "Deer Park" might suggest, the area is home to a large population of white-tail deer.

== Recreation ==
Today there are five miles of marked hiking trails, in addition to nine miles of mountain biking and equestrian trails. The Plum Island Eagle Sanctuary is located nearby.
