= La Salle, Illinois =

La Salle LaSalle
- City
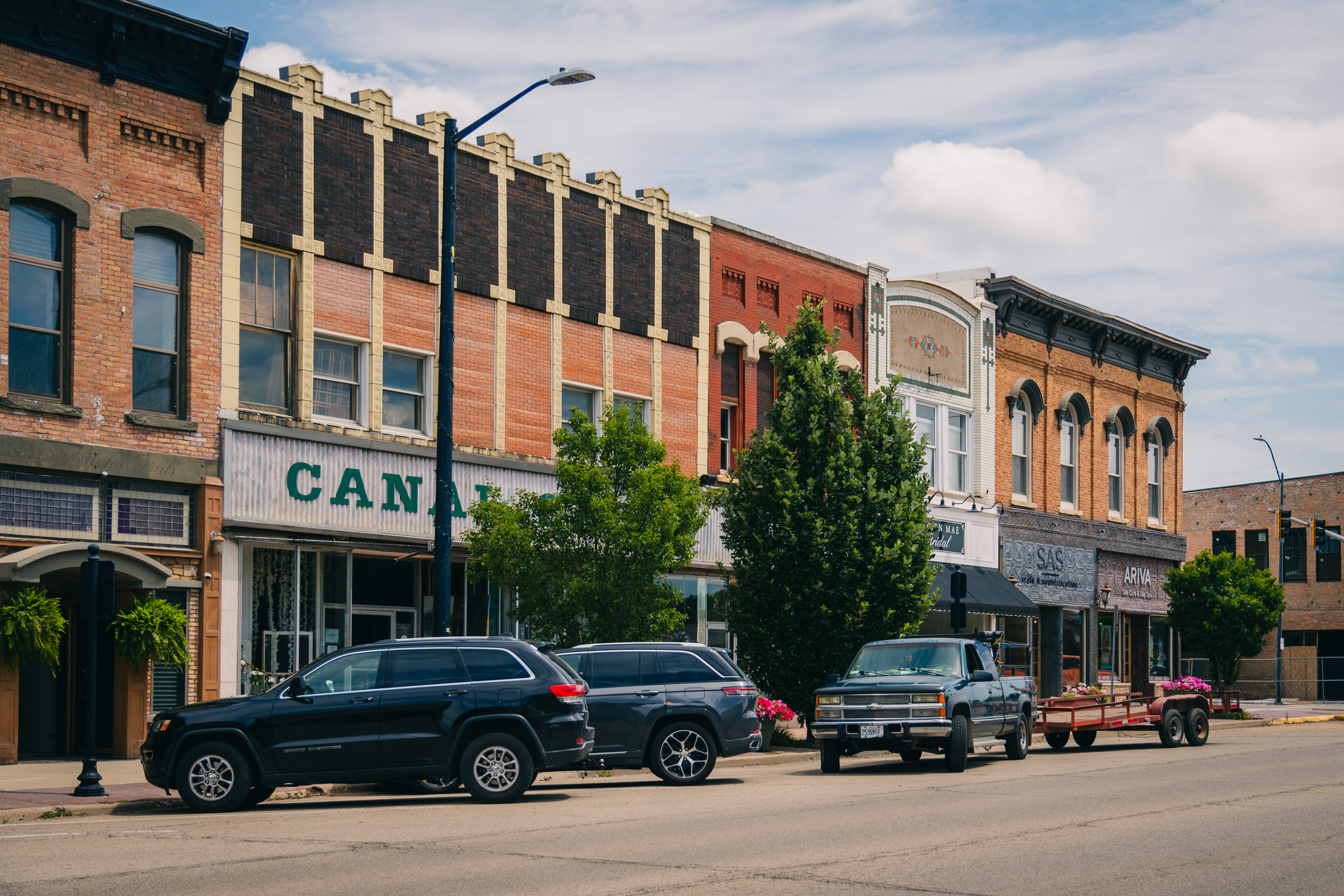
- A view of First Street in La Salle, Illinois, looking northeast toward Joliet Street.

- Location of La Salle in LaSalle County, Illinois.
- Coordinates: 41°21′50″N 89°06′30″W
- Country: United States
- State: Illinois
- County: LaSalle
- Townships: La Salle, Utica, Peru, Waltham, Dimmick
- Founded: 1852

Government
  - Mayor: Jeff Grove

Area
  - Total: 13.57 sq mi (35.15 km^{2})
  - Land: 13.46 sq mi (34.85 km^{2})
  - Water: 0.12 sq mi (0.30 km^{2})
- Elevation: 604 ft (184 m)

Population (2020)
  - Total: 9,582
  - Estimate (2025): 9,388
  - Density: 712.0/sq mi (274.92/km^{2})
- Time zone: UTC−6 (CST)
  - Summer (DST): UTC−5 (CDT)
- ZIP Code(s): 61301
- Area codes: 815, 779
- FIPS code: 17-42184
- GNIS feature ID: 2395636
- Website: lasalle-il.gov liveituplasalle.com

La Salle or LaSalle is a city in LaSalle County, Illinois, United States, located at the intersection of Interstates 39 and 80. It is part of the Ottawa, IL Micropolitan Statistical Area. Originally platted in 1837 over one square mile (2.6 square kilometers), the city's boundaries have grown to 12 sq mi (31 km^{2}). Named in honor of 17th century Illinois valley explorer, the Sieur de La Salle, city boundaries extend from the Illinois River and Illinois and Michigan Canal to a mile north of Interstate 80 and from the city of Peru on the west to the village of North Utica on the east. Starved Rock State Park is located approximately 5 mi (8 km) to the east. The population was 9,582 as of the 2020 census, down from 9,609 at the 2010 census. LaSalle and its twin city, Peru, make up the core of the Illinois Valley. Due to their combined dominance of the zinc processing industry in the early 1900s, they were collectively nicknamed "Zinc City."

== History ==
LaSalle was named in honor of the early French explorer Robert de LaSalle.

=== Canal port (1836–1933) ===
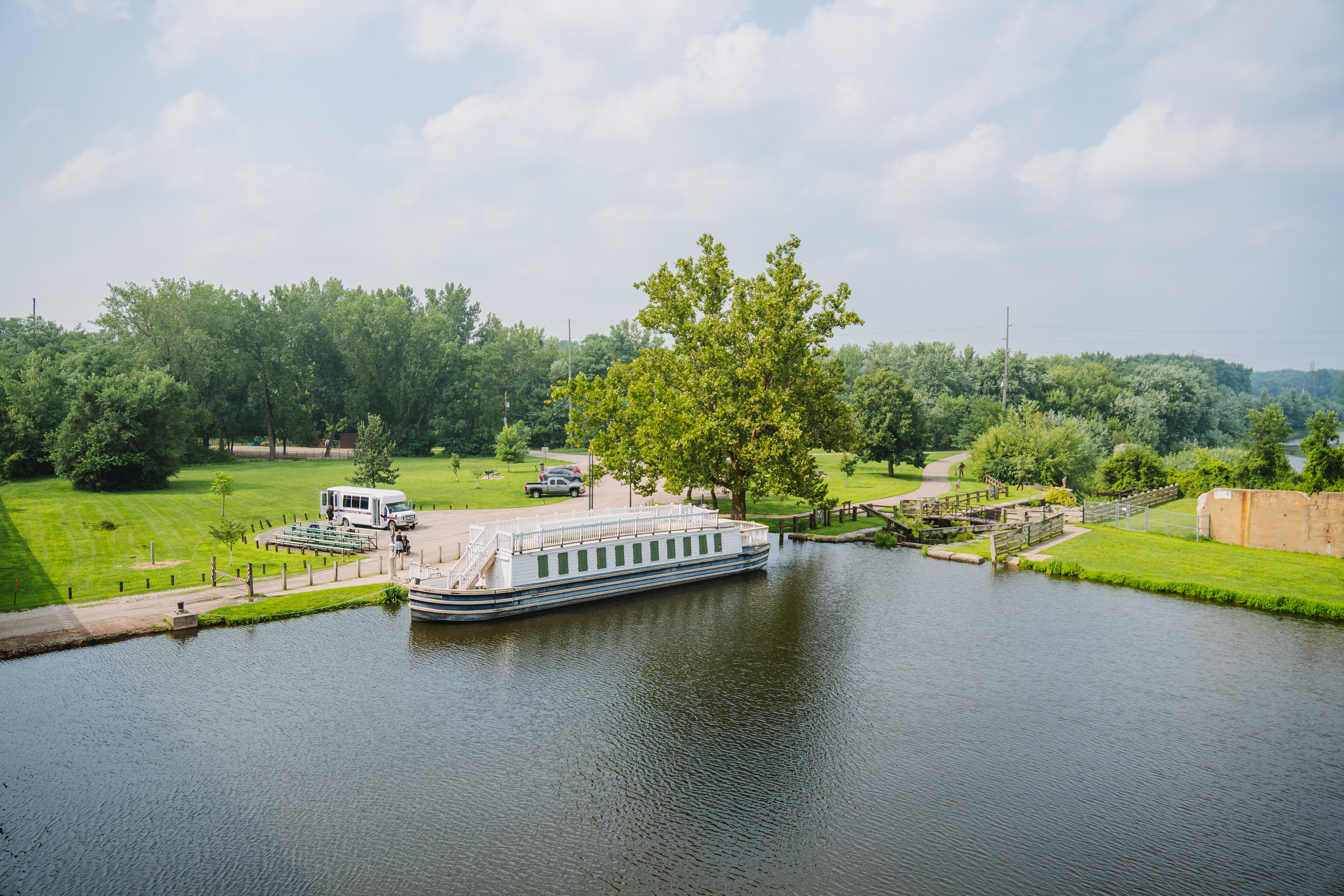
The Illinois and Michigan Canal on a sunny day in La Salle, Illinois. In the water sits The Volunteer, an 1848 replica canal boat that carries visitors on 60- and 90-minute trips through the canal and its history.

The Illinois and Michigan Canal was first thought up by French explorer Louis Joliet. Much later, when Illinois became a state, the idea of a canal connecting Lake Michigan to the Illinois River was supported by many, including Abraham Lincoln. The 96-mile canal was finally constructed between 1836 and 1848. Upon its completion, Chicago became the eastern terminus and LaSalle became the western terminus. LaSalle boomed as a transshipment point from canal boats coming from Chicago to steamboats going to St. Louis and New Orleans. It became a place where Northern and Southern culture met.

It is difficult to imagine the level of frenzied activity that once took place at locks 14 and 15, where the canal boat basin and the steamboat basins were located. Steamboats from New Orleans unloaded molasses, sugar, coffee, and fresh oranges and lemons. Canal boats from Chicago brought lumber, stoves, wagons, and the latest clothing styles from the east. Local farmers hauled corn and wheat to be shipped to Chicago and points east. Passengers hustled to make connections to canal boats bound for Chicago or steamboats headed to St. Louis and beyond. Hotels and other services were available to travelers. Many stores grew catering to canal trade.

Today the story can be told at the La Salle Canal Boat, the Volunteer.

=== Zinc City (1858–1978) ===
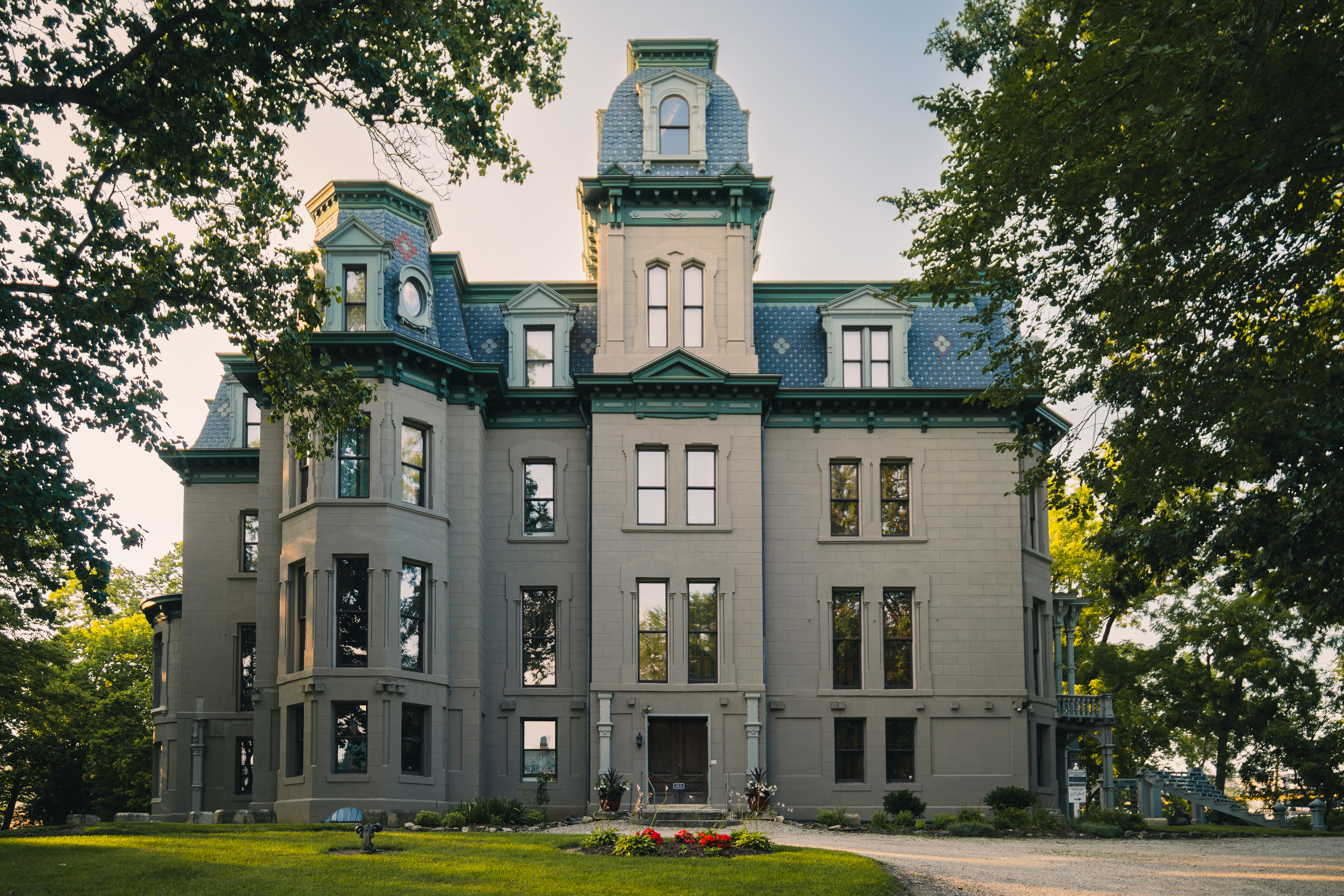
The Hegeler Carus Mansion in La Salle, Illinois, as seen from 7th Street looking north.

By the mid-1850s, LaSalle had begun to exploit the coal that lay underneath much of the city. The LaSalle Coal Mining Company completed the first shaft in 1855 and many other companies soon followed. By 1884 there were six shafts in the area, the deepest 452 feet. The history of LaSalle would have been different were it not for the arrival of two immigrants in 1858. Frederick William Matthiessen met German born Edward C. Hegeler at a prestigious mining school, and after graduating in 1856, the two traveled together to the United States. In 1858, attracted by the abundance of coal, coupled with the excellent transportation links provided by the canal and the Illinois Central Railroad, they chose LaSalle as the site for an innovative zinc smelting plant, the first in the United States. Before the plant opened, nearly all of the zinc used in the United States was imported. Zinc is needed to make brass and was a common fire-proofing material. Most significantly, zinc was used to prevent corrosion of iron and steel. With the opening of the first steel production plant in Joliet in the early 1870s, zinc became an important part of the local industrial economy. In a decade the Matthiessen and Hegeler Zinc Works became the largest producer of zinc in the country, and one of the largest in the world.

The Matthiessens, Hegelers and their families were involved in developing the community. They helped found industries such as the LaSalle Machine and Tool Company and the Western Clock Co. that would later become Westclox. Mary Hegeler married Dr. Paul Carus, who founded the Open Court Publishing Company in 1887, whose mission was "establishing ethics and religion upon a scientific basis" and was a key figure in introducing Eastern thought to the United States, making LaSalle "Buddhism's Gateway to the West." Matthiessen was a philanthropist, who served as Mayor of LaSalle from 1886 to 1895. He gave thousands of dollars to help build the sewer system, the electric light plant and roads and bridges. As the first president of the LaSalle-Peru High School Board, he was a generous donor to the school. In 1914, Matthiessen established the Hygienic Institute to combat epidemics. A public benefactor, Matthiessen opened much of his estate, called Deer Park, to the public with the nominal entrance fee going to charity. In 1943, this property was named Matthiessen State Park in his honor. On the day of his funeral in February 1918, the entire community suspended all business between 11 and 12 o’clock.

Today, this story is told at the Hegeler-Carus Mansion.

=== Little Reno (1933–1953) ===
With the end of Prohibition in 1933, saloons no longer operated under the euphemism of "soft drink" vendors, and these and related gambling concerns flourished. Although illegal, gambling proliferated in LaSalle, supporting the abundant and related tobacco, liquor, food, and lodging businesses.

Travelers arrived by car or via the Rock Island Rocket from Chicago for a Saturday night's revelry in such numbers that the streets of LaSalle are said to have been standing-room only. There was wall to wall entertainment along First Street, at the heart of which was the Kelly and Cawley liquor and gambling house. LaSalle became known as "Little Reno" and boasted dozens of clubs. With between 60 and 80 saloons in LaSalle from 1940 to 1950 this continued to be the town's primary commercial enterprise. In 1953 a federal raid on Kelly and Cawley's ended the era.

=== Largest employers ===
The following businesses have more than 100 people staffed, making them the six largest in LaSalle:

- J.C. Whitney 313
- Carus Chemical 264
- Illinois Veteran's Home 200
- LaSalle-Peru Township High School 180
- Illinois Cement Company 148
- News-Tribune 101

== Geography ==
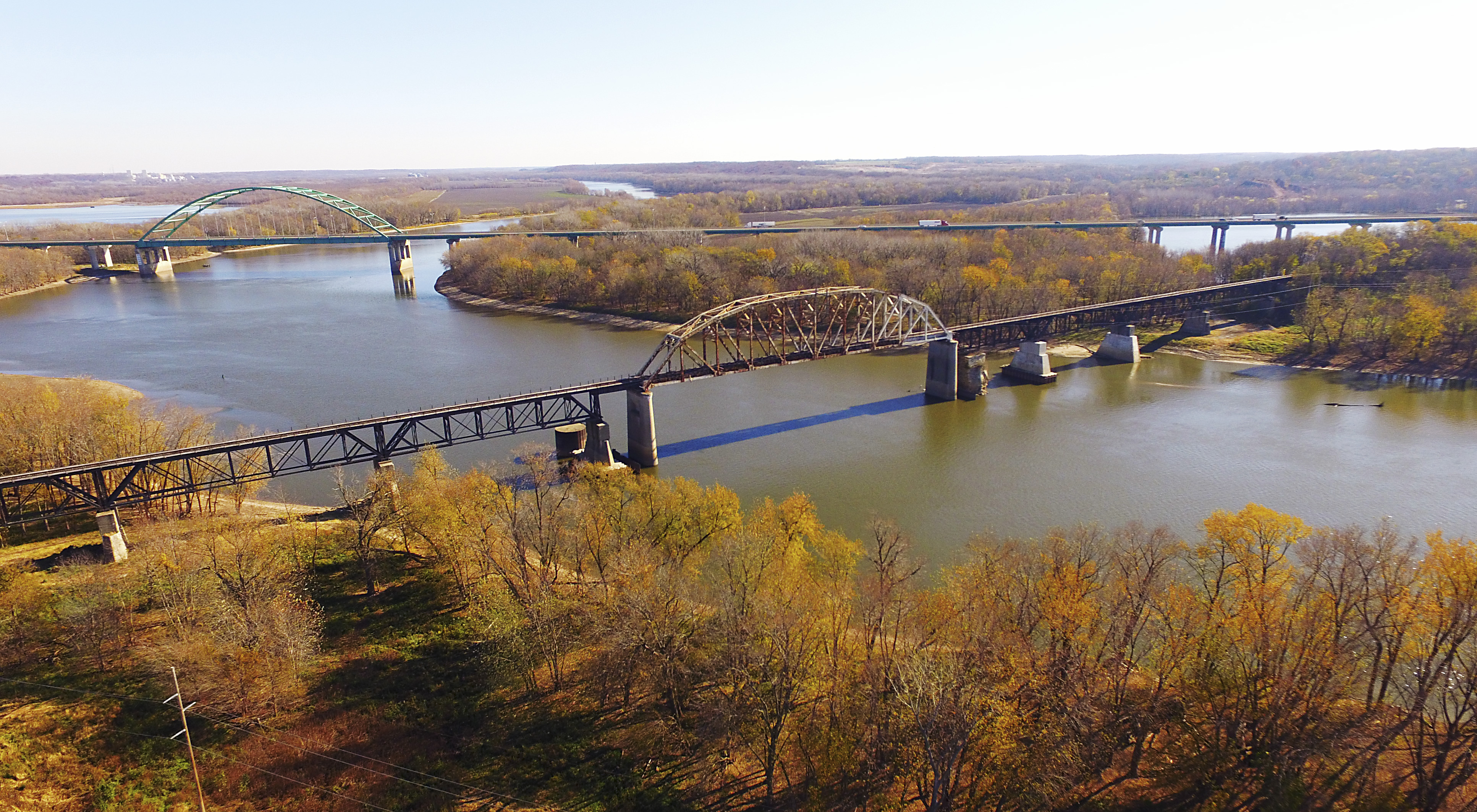
Abraham Lincoln Memorial Bridge and LaSalle Rail Bridge over the Illinois River

LaSalle-Peru is at the center of a network of Illinois' largest cities, between Rockford, the Quad Cities, Peoria, Bloomington, and Aurora and Joliet at the edge of Chicagoland. They are at the crossroads of I-39 and I-80. It is located on a bluff above the Illinois River and the Illinois and Michigan Canal. The scenic sandstone bluffs and rivers of the area make it a destination for hiking and adventure tourism. LaSalle is the closest large town to two of Illinois most popular parks: Starved Rock State Park and Matthiessen State Park (created from the estate of LaSalle industrialist Frederick William Matthiessen).

The development of a coal mining region fragmented this micropolitan area into many small towns. LaSalle and Peru make up the center of this community often referred to as the Illinois Valley. There is a dense halo of small towns surrounding the twin cities, most of them formed as mining and industrial suburbs. These towns span Bureau, Putnam, and LaSalle Counties and include former coal mining towns of Spring Valley, Oglesby, Cherry, Ladd, Dalzell, Seatonville, Hollowayville, Mark, Granville, Standard, and Cedar Point, the industrial river and canal towns of Utica, Hennepin, and DePue, as well as the agricultural towns of Tonica, Lostant, McNabb, Magnolia, Arlington, and Troy Grove. When looking at job interdependence, these communities form a single whole. The population of LaSalle-Peru and its suburbs is over 42,000. Due to the fragmentation of the community across municipal, township, and county borders, the true size of the community is rarely measured. LaSalle-Peru and its suburbs form the largest community (20,696 jobs) in the Ottawa, IL Micropolitan Statistical Area where they compete with Ottawa-Marseilles and its suburbs (19,095 jobs) and the smaller trade centers of Streator (8,224 jobs), Princeton (9,322 jobs), and Mendota (5,813 jobs). The trade area of LaSalle-Peru also extends into Marshall County and the eastern portion of Lee County. The Ottawa Micropolitan Statistical Area is the 9th largest statistical area in Illinois.

Downtown LaSalle is the hub of the community. The principal shopping streets are First Street, Marquette Street, and Gooding Street. It is one of the largest employment centers in the area with over 1,400 jobs. Downtown LaSalle hosts approximately 248 active businesses These small Downtown businesses cumulatively represent approximately and $419 million in gross annual sales.

According to the 2021 census gazetteer files, LaSalle has a total area of 13.57 square miles (35.15 km^{2}), of which 13.46 square miles (34.86 km^{2}) (or 99.15%) is land and 0.12 square miles (0.31 km^{2}) (or 0.85%) is water.

=== Climate ===
Climate data for LaSalle, Illinois
Month	Jan	Feb	Mar	Apr	May	Jun	Jul	Aug	Sep	Oct	Nov	Dec	Year
Record high °F (°C)	66 (19)	72 (22)	84 (29)	91 (33)	96 (36)	101 (38)	104 (40)	103 (39)	98 (37)	91 (33)	79 (26)	70 (21)	104 (40)
Mean daily maximum °F (°C)	30 (−1)	36 (2)	48 (9)	62 (17)	73 (23)	82 (28)	85 (29)	83 (28)	77 (25)	64 (18)	49 (9)	34 (1)	60 (16)
Mean daily minimum °F (°C)	14 (−10)	18 (−8)	28 (−2)	39 (4)	49 (9)	59 (15)	63 (17)	61 (16)	52 (11)	41 (5)	31 (−1)	18 (−8)	39 (4)
Record low °F (°C)	−26 (−32)	−21 (−29)	−8 (−22)	13 (−11)	25 (−4)	37 (3)	42 (6)	40 (4)	27 (−3)	16 (−9)	5 (−15)	−21 (−29)	−26 (−32)

== Demographics ==
Historical population
Census	Pop.	Note	%±
1860	3,993		—
1870	5,200		30.2%
1880	7,847		50.9%
1890	9,855		25.6%
1900	10,446		6.0%
1910	11,537		10.4%
1920	13,050		13.1%
1930	13,149		0.8%
1940	12,812		−2.6%
1950	12,083		−5.7%
1960	11,897		−1.5%
1970	10,736		−9.8%
1980	10,341		−3.7%
1990	9,090		−12.1%
2000	9,796		7.8%
2010	9,609		−1.9%
2020	9,582		−0.3%
2025 (est.)	9,388		−2.0%
Decennial US Census

=== Racial and ethnic composition ===
LaSalle city, Illinois – Racial and ethnic composition Note: the US Census treats Hispanic/Latino as an ethnic category. This table excludes Latinos from the racial categories and assigns them to a separate category. Hispanics/Latinos may be of any race.
Race / Ethnicity (NH = Non-Hispanic)	Pop 2000	Pop 2010	Pop 2020	% 2000	% 2010	% 2020
White alone (NH)	8,718	7,836	7,130	89.00%	81.55%	74.41%
Black or African American alone (NH)	124	152	239	1.27%	1.58%	2.49%
Native American or Alaska Native alone (NH)	9	23	15	0.09%	0.24%	0.16%
Asian alone (NH)	44	82	85	0.45%	0.85%	0.89%
Native Hawaiian or Pacific Islander alone (NH)	3	0	1	0.03%	0.00%	0.01%
Other race alone (NH)	9	1	17	0.09%	0.01%	0.18%
Mixed race or Multiracial (NH)	84	146	366	0.86%	1.52%	3.82%
Hispanic or Latino (any race)	805	1,369	1,729	8.22%	14.25%	18.04%
Total	9,796	9,609	9,582	100.00%	100.00%	100.00%

=== 2020 census ===
As of the 2020 census there were 9,582 people, 3,758 households, and 2,283 families residing in the city. The population density was 711.9 inhabitants per square mile (274.9/km^{2}). There were 4,483 housing units at an average density of 333.1 per square mile (128.6/km^{2}). The racial makeup of the city was 79.0% White, 2.7% African American, 0.6% Native American, 0.9% Asian, 0.0% Pacific Islander, 6.1% from other races, and 10.7% from two or more races. Hispanic or Latino of any race were 18.0% of the population.

There were 3,758 households, out of which 26.6% had children under the age of 18 living with them, 42.7% were married couples living together, 12.2% had a female householder with no husband present, and 39.2% were non-families. 29.6% of all households were made up of individuals, and 11.7% had someone living alone who was 65 years of age or older. The average household size was 2.34 and the average family size was 2.97.

The city's age distribution consisted of 21.5% under the age of 18, 10.2% from 18 to 24, 40% from 15 to 44, and 18.4% who were 65 years of age or older. The median age was 38.6 years, and for every 100 females there were 101.9 males.

The median income for a household in the city was $53,208, and the median income for a family was $58,898. Males had a median income of $46,020 versus $33,108 for females. The per capita income for the city was $27,428. About 12.2% of families and 16.7% of the population were living below the poverty line, including 26.9% of those under 18 and 11.7% of those 65 and older.

== Culture ==
=== Entertainment and the Arts ===
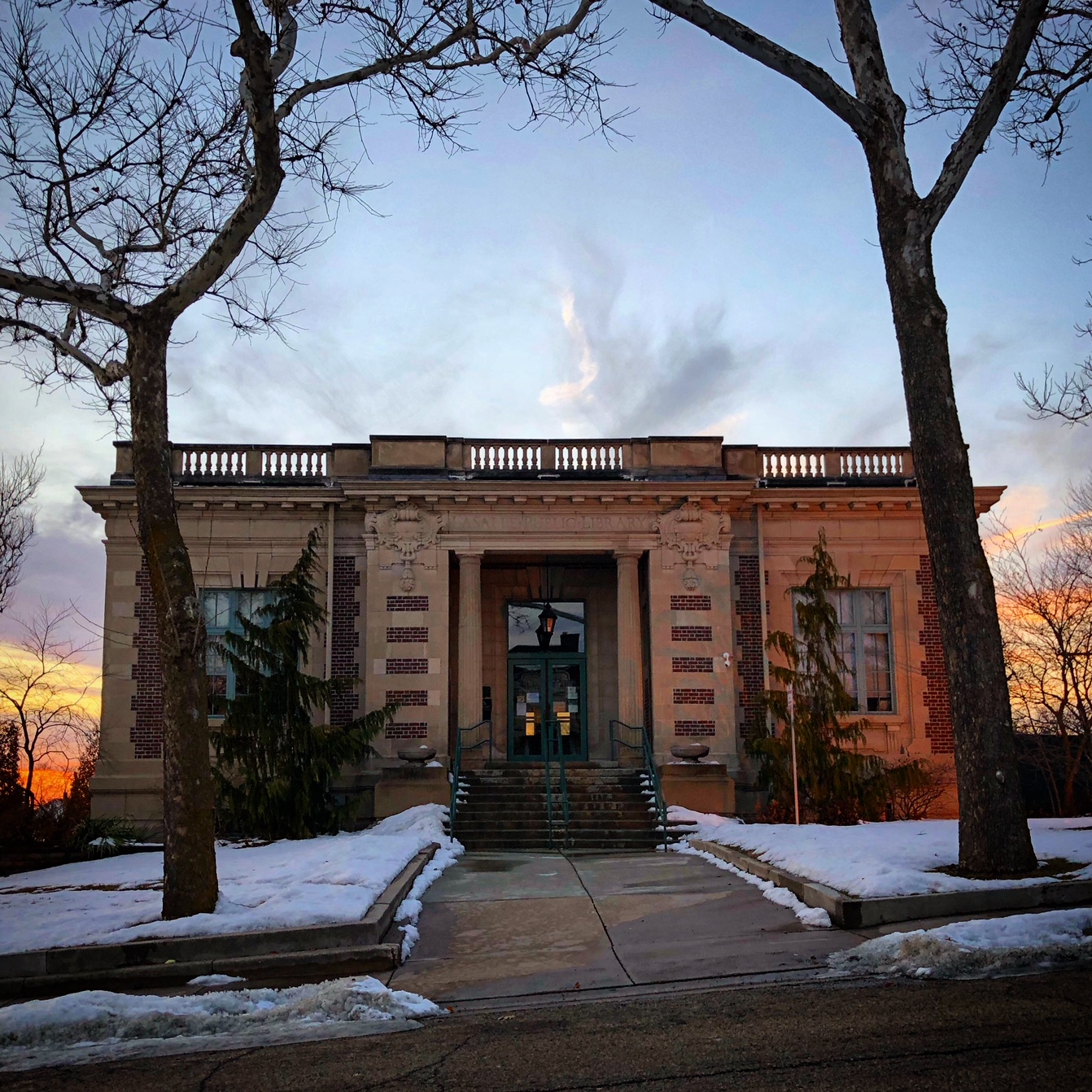
LaSalle Public Library, a Carnegie Library

La Salle is part of an extensive arts network including the Illinois Valley Symphony Orchestra, Illinois Valley Youth Symphony Orchestra, and Stage 212 community theater. The Dance Center, Music Suite 408, and Maestro & Mi provide dance and music lessons to students of all ages. North Central Illinois ARTworks is a regional non-profit arts advocacy organization dedicated to supporting and expanding the arts community in the area; local visual artists often display their works in the gallery in the historic Westclox building. Matthiessen Auditorium at La Salle-Peru Township High School hosts many performing arts groups, including the LaSalle-Peru Township High School band, jazz band, choir, musical, and local junior high bands.

The Jazz in the Street festival has been held annually in mid-September since 2006. Most years, there have been appearances by locally popular bands, including the Illinois Valley Community College and Northern Illinois University jazz bands.

=== Tourism ===
In 2024, the City of La Salle, Illinois, launched a brand-new tourism brand, "Live It Up La Salle". The website and social media pages work to communicate the attractions, landmarks, restaurants, shops, and things to do in La Salle to both visitors and residents alike.

Tourism in the area is driven by Starved Rock State Park, Matthiessen State Park, Buffalo Rock State Park and I&M Canal National Heritage Area. There are several museums in and near La Salle:

- I&M Canal National Heritage Area Visitor Center and La Salle Canal Boat, also called "Lock 16" (there are only 15 locks on the I&M Canal). In the Lock 14 basin, just south of downtown La Salle is the Volunteer, an 1880s replica Canal Boat. It provides a mule-pulled ride on the historic Illinois and Michigan Canal. The one-hour, round-trip journey traverses the hand-dug waterway that 19th-century pioneers traveled. The guides, dressed as Canal Era crew and passengers, provide a vignette of life on the American frontier and the Illinois prairie.
- Hegeler Carus Mansion. The mansion, built in 1874 for the Hegeler Family by W. W. Boyington, is a lavish Victorian-era home with 57 rooms, 10 fireplaces, the oldest private gymnasium in America and a dining room table seating 22 people. The mansion features intricate, hand-painted walls and ceilings, elaborate woodwork, century-old chandeliers, parquet floors, floor-to-ceiling windows, etched glass windows and other fine details.
- Westclox Museum
- La Salle County Historical Society Museum
- Starved Rock Visitor Center
- Illinois Waterway Visitor Center
- Wild Bill Hickok Memorial
- Putnam County Pulsifer House & Ag Museum

Downtown La Salle is a historic district with many historical structures and shops and boutiques catering to tourists.

La Salle has several National Historical Structures: Hotel Kaskaskia, the Hegeler-Carus Mansion, the Julius W. Hegeler House, and the La Salle City Building. La Salle has a National Historic Landmark: the Hegeler Carus Mansion.

=== Sports ===
There is a strong Little League of nearly 30 baseball teams. The Illinois Valley Youth Football League folded in the mid-2000s, giving way to the LaSalle-Peru Youth Football League.

The city housed minor league baseball. In 1914, the LaSalle Blue Sox played as members of the Class D level Illinois–Missouri League They posted a 26–60 record.

=== Media ===
The area is home to three radio stations, WLPO, WAJK, and WLWF, all operating under Starved Rock Media.

For newspaper, the NewsTribune serves the area, as well as many Chicago newspapers.

== Education ==
La Salle-Peru Township High School serves 9th–12th graders. La Salle Elementary School District 122 (made up of two schools: Lincoln Junior High and Northwest Elementary) offers education for grades PreK-8th, as well as Trinity Catholic Academy.

== Transportation ==
The city is at the crossroads of Interstate 80 and Interstate 39. Illinois Route 351 separates the east and west of US Route 6. US Route 51 also runs through the city. The CSX New Rock Subdivision runs through town, with Iowa Interstate Railroad running via trackage rights. The Illinois Railway La Salle Line also runs through town, crossing the CSX Line and continuing on to a sand pit that they service.

While there is no fixed-route transit service in La Salle, intercity bus service is provided by Burlington Trailways in nearby Peru.

== Carus Chemical Plant Fire ==
In 2023, the Carus Chemical plant had a major fire. The cause of the fire was originally unknown, but on March 30, 2026, they revealed that it was caused by friction between a forklift and spilled potassium permanganate. The plant was required to be torn down due to the fire.

== Points of interest ==
- Hegeler Carus Mansion
- La Salle Canal Boat
- La Salle Speedway
- Peru-La Salle Station
- Starved Rock State Park

== Notable people ==
- James T. Aubrey, Jr. (1918–1994), television and film executive, born in La Salle
- H. R. Baukhage (1889–1976), newsman, born in La Salle
- Heinie Berger (1882–1954), pitcher for the Cleveland Naps, born in La Salle
- Timothy Blackstone (1829–1900), executive, businessman, philanthropist, and politician, second mayor of La Salle
- Alexander Campbell (1814–1898), Illinois politician, first mayor of La Salle
- Paul Carus (1852‑1919), German-American editor and first managing editor of Open Court Publishing Company and first editor of The Monist, lived in the Hegeler Carus Mansion
- Hal Cherne (1907–1983), offensive lineman for the Boston Redskins, born in La Salle
- Lynden Evans (1858–1926), U.S. Representative, born in La Salle
- John Fitzpatrick (1904–1990), coach for the Los Angeles Angels, born in La Salle
- Mike Goff, offensive guard for the Kansas City Chiefs; attended La Salle-Peru High School
- Edward C. Hegeler (1835–1910), German-American manufacturer and founder of Open Court Publishing Company and The Monist; built the Hegeler Carus Mansion
- Thomas L. Kilbride, Illinois Supreme Court Justice, born in La Salle
- Rick Kolowski (born 1944), Nebraska state legislator
- Harry Lachman (1886–1975), artist and film director, born in La Salle
- Albert C. Martin, Sr. (1879–1960), architect and engineer, born in La Salle
- Frederick William Matthiessen (1835–1918) philanthropist, industrialist, and former Mayor of La Salle
- Philip Godfrey Reinhard, federal judge, born in La Salle
- Daisetz Teitaro Suzuki (1870–1966), noted western author of Buddhist and Zen teachings, worked on writings and translations at the Hegeler Carus Mansion
- Walt Tauscher (1901–1992), pitcher for the Pittsburgh Pirates and Washington Senators, born in La Salle
- Luke Yaklich, head coach for the UIC Flames men's basketball team, attended La Salle-Peru High School and formerly coached its basketball team
