= The Monist =

- Discipline: Philosophy
- Language: English
- Edited by: Fraser MacBride, University of Manchester

Publication details
- History: 1890–1936; 1962–present
- Publisher: Oxford University Press on behalf of the Hegeler Institute
- Frequency: Quarterly

Standard abbreviations
- ISO 4: Monist

Indexing
- ISSN: 0026-9662 (print); 2153-3601 (web)
- LCCN: 08-22458
- OCLC no.: 1758549

Links
- Journal homepage; Online archive

The Monist: An International Quarterly Journal of General Philosophical Inquiry is a quarterly peer-reviewed academic journal in the field of philosophy. It was established in October 1890 by American publisher Edward C. Hegeler.

== History ==
Initially the journal published papers not only by philosophers but also by prominent scientists and mathematicians such as Ernst Mach, David Hilbert, Henri Poincaré, Alfred Binet, Pierre Janet, Cesare Lombroso and Ernst Haeckel. The journal helped to professionalize philosophy as an academic discipline in the United States by publishing philosophers such as Charles Sanders Peirce, Ernst Cassirer, John Dewey, Gottlob Frege, Hans-Georg Gadamer, Sidney Hook, C. I. Lewis, Hilary Putnam, Willard Van Orman Quine, and Bertrand Russell. Russell's Philosophy of Logical Atomism was originally published in full as a series of articles in the journal in 1918–19.

After ceasing publication in 1936, the journal resumed publication in 1962 and has been continually published since then. Each issue contains papers on a single, pre-announced topic. A list of topics thus far is provided here.

The journal's editors-in-chief have included Paul Carus (1890–1919), Mary Hegeler Carus (1919–1936), Eugene Freeman (1962–1983), John Hospers (1983–1991), Barry Smith (University at Buffalo, 1992-2016), Fraser MacBride (University of Manchester, 2017–present). Since January 2015 the journal has been published by Oxford University Press on behalf of the Hegeler Institute.

== Abstracting and indexing ==
The journal is abstracted and indexed:

- Academic Search
- Arts & Humanities Citation Index
- ATLA Religion Database
- Expanded Academic ASAP
- Factiva
- FRANCIS
- International Bibliography of Periodical Literature
- International Philosophical Bibliography
- Philosopher's Index
- Philosophy Research Index
- PhilPapers
- ProQuest 5000
- VINITI Database RAS
- Scopus

== See also ==
- List of philosophy journals
  - Mind
