= Freiberg University of Mining and Technology =

University in Freiberg, Germany

Technische Universität Bergakademie Freiberg
- Established: 1765
- Rector: Jutta Emes
- Total staff: 2,126 (2025)
- Students: 4,389 (WS 2024/25)
- Location: Freiberg, Germany
- Website: https://tu-freiberg.de/en

The Technische Universität Bergakademie Freiberg (abbreviation: TU Bergakademie Freiberg, TUBAF; inofficial translation: Freiberg University of Mining and Technology) is a public university of technology with 4,389 students in the city of Freiberg, Saxony, in Germany. The university's focuses are exploration, mining and extraction, processing, and recycling of natural resources and scrap, as well as developing new materials and researching renewable energies. It is the oldest university of mining and metallurgy in the world.

== History ==
=== Pre-1945 ===
The institution was established in 1765, during the Age of Enlightenment, by Prince Francis Xavier of Saxony based on plans by Friedrich Wilhelm von Oppel and Friedrich Anton von Heynitz. At the time, it was called the Kurfürstlich-Sächsische Bergakademie zu Freiberg (by 1806: Königlich-Sächsische Bergakademie zu Freiberg). Its main purpose was the education of highly skilled miners and scientists in fields connected to mining and metallurgy. There had developed a need for mining, as an industry to regenerate Saxony's economy, since Saxony had been defeated in the Seven Years' War.

Before the establishment of the Bergakademie (mining school), four similar institutions had been founded in other countries: Potosí, Bolivia (1757–1786); Kongsberg, Norway (1757–1814); Schemnitz, today's Slovakia (Banská Štiavnica, 1762–1919); and Prague (1762–1772). Since these do not exist anymore, Freiberg University is the oldest and still operational University of Mining and Technology. After the École des Ponts et Chaussées, which was established in 1747, it is also the second oldest institution of higher learning with focus on STEM-research (university of technology).

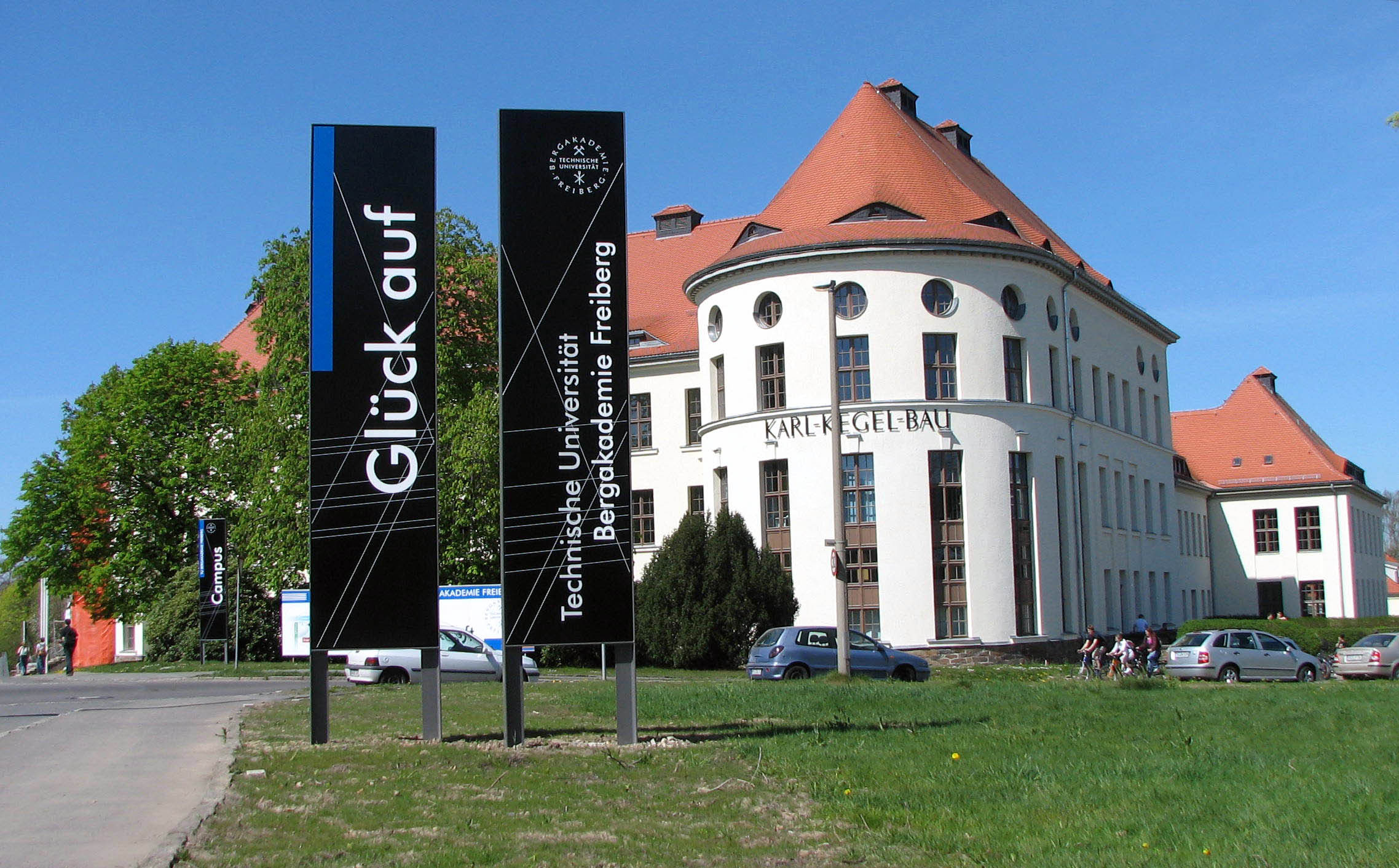
TU Bergakademie campus, April 2007

The chemical elements indium (1863) and germanium (1886) were discovered by scientists of Freiberg University. The polymath Alexander von Humboldt studied mining at the Bergakademie from 1791 to 1792, as did the poet Novalis from 1797 to 1799.

In 1899, it was incorporated as a Technische Hochschule. In 1905, Bergakademie gained the right to grant doctorates in engineering (Dr.-Ing.), and in 1939 for natural sciences (Dr. rer. nat.). In 1940, two novel faculties (divisions) where established: Natural Sciences and Mining & Metallurgy. In 1956, another faculty concerning economy was added.

=== 1945 to 1990 ===
After World War II, education of future engineers and scientists, as well as research were quickly re-established in order to (re-)build primary industry in the Soviet Occupation Zone/GDR. The campus and faculty-staff were expanded rapidly. The educational direction changed through establishing novel courses. Also, the student demographics changed (percentage of women increased), since the access to college was directed by central authorities. Additionally, children of "workers and farmers", who traditionally didn't pursue tertiary education, were supported by having a college preparation institute (Arbeiter-und-Bauern-Fakultät (ABF) "Wilhelm Pieck").

=== Since 1990 ===
In the aftermath of German reunification, the infrastructure and academic body were reorganized in order to fit the new political circumstances. After its incorporation into the West German system of higher education, Bergakademie quickly found a prime position as "The University of Resources". As the first East German University, it joined the German Research Foundation. In connection, the social sciences section were eliminated, while a faculty for economics was restructured and expanded to 15 professorships.

One of the emerging focus points in research was semiconductors, which led to corporations settling in and around Freiberg. These include Siltronic AG, Meyer Burger Technology AG, and JT Energy Systems, specializing in semiconductors, solar power, and lithium-ion batteries, respectively. Besides geo- and materials sciences, environmental science became a university strong point.

In March 1993, then Technische Hochschule Bergakademie Freiberg was renamed Technische Universität Bergakademie Freiberg, underlining its increased status and significance.

The university's history is presented in the Historicum through numerous exhibits, paintings and photographs, and documents. The Forum for Mining History (Forum Montangeschichte) is responsible for digitizing and publishing historic essays and publications concerning Saxony's historical mining and metallurgical industry.

== Research ==
TUBAF describes itself as a modern research university, especially focused on current and future ecological and economical challenges. Interdisciplinary research is emphasized. Most investigated topics revolve around alternative methods in resource extraction, energy systems, compound materials and recycling. The university is recognized worldwide for its expertise in geoscience and materials science.

TUBAF is in the Top 10 of universities in Germany based on third-party (private) funding per professor, according to a 2022 study. A number of patents and inventions by TUBAF-based researchers are recognized each year.

== Programs ==
The university offers programs taught in German, as well as international programs entirely taught in English. All in all, there are 68 programs. Among those are unique ones, such as Applied Natural Sciences, Industrial Archeology, Mine-Surveying, and Chemistry (Diplom), which are taught in German.

Admission to all programs from Bachelor through Ph.D. is performance-based and without tuition fees (as usual for consecutive studies at German public universities); students pay a registration fee of €107 per semester, of which €10 are dedicated solely to the Student Body (Council).

14 Master's programs (date: WS 2025/26) are taught in English:

- Advanced Materials Analysis (AMA)
- Advanced Mineral Resource Development (AMRD)
- Applied Geoscience
- Chemical Engineering
- Computational Materials Science (CMS)
- Geomatics for Mineral Resource Management
- Groundwater Management
- International Business and Resources in Emerging Markets (IBRE)
- Mathematics for Data and Resource Sciences
- Mechanical and Process Engineering (MPE)
- Metallic Materials Technology (MMT)
- Sustainable and Innovative Natural Resource Management (SINReM)
- Sustainable Mining and Remediation Management (MoRe)
- Technology and Application of Inorganic Engineering Materials (TAIEM)

Freiberg University of Mining and Technology has been ranked among the best universities worldwide for mining engineering.

Though a public university, it has a relatively large private endowment. The university is home to one of the largest German university foundations.

== Structure ==
TU Bergakademie Freiberg is led by a rectorate, legislative decisions are made by the senate or extended senate.

The rectorate consists of rector, chancellor, and two prorectors for Education and Research, respectively.

The university has 6 subdivisions called faculties:

1. Mathematics and Computer Science
2. Chemistry and Physics
3. Geosciences, Geoengineering and Mining
4. Mechanical, Process and Energy Engineering
5. Materials Science and Technology
6. Economics

== Student body ==
In winter 2024/25 4,389 students were enrolled at TUBAF, 83% in STEM-programs, 33% of whom were female.

52% of the students were from foreign countries. There are double degree agreements with universities in China, France, Ghana, Italy, Poland, Russia, Thailand, and others. About 30% of the doctoral degrees awarded by the university are given to foreign students.

== Campus, institutes and facilities ==
=== Campus ===
Unlike other historical universities in Germany, TUBAF has a campus with most of its buildings and facilities in close proximity. The oldest buildings lie in the historic (medieval) city center, among these the

- Main Buildung - administration, student office, and Faculty 1
- Schlossplatzquartier - Faculty 6, international office, SIZ (student café)
- Alte Mensa - former dining hall, now event location and student-run bar
- Werner-Bau - Faculty 3

The majority of the university's infrastructure can be found in the north of the city, including

- Library "Gregorius Agricola"
- Dining Hall "Neue Mensa" with cafeteria and a student-run bar
- several buildings of Faculties 1 through 5
- student housing (dorms)

The two main parts are connected by a so-called 'corridor' of recent buildings and greenery.

Additionally, a part of the university is located above and around the "Lehr- und Forschungsbergwerk Reiche Zeche", a historical mine, operated today as a teaching and research facility.

Other infrastructure includes the university sports centre, Lessing-Bau and the Scientific Diving Center.

=== Institutes and facilities ===
Through its specialization, TUBAF has created a number of institutions, centers, and facilities with state-of-the-art research equipment. Unique in Europe is the still operational mine for teaching as well as underground exploration research. TUBAF is one of two German institutions, where scientific divers are trained.

== Notable alumni ==
- Abraham Gottlob Werner (1749–1817), influential lecturer and scientist, who systematized minerals and rock formations
- Alexander von Humboldt (1769–1859), renowned naturalist, historian, and humanitarian
- Novalis (1772–1801; Georg Philipp Friedrich von Hardenberg), poet
- Wilhelm August Lampadius (1772–1842), professor of chemistry and metallurgy, installed the first gas light on the European continent and advanced the technology to an industrial scale
- Hieronymus Theodor Richter (1824–1898), chemist, and Ferdinand Reich (1799–1882), physicist, discoverers of the chemical element Indium
- Clemens Alexander Winkler (1838–1904), chemistry professor, isolated the element Germanium for the first time
- Edward Renouf (1846–1934), chemistry professor, Johns Hopkins University
- Mary Hegeler Carus (1861–1936), the first woman to legally enroll (in 1885)
- Luo Gan (born 1935), former Member of the Politburo Standing Committee of the Chinese Communist Party
- Hans Albrecht (1919–2008), party functionary of the Socialist Unity Party (SED), convicted of manslaughter in the Berlin Wall shooting trials
- Hans Jürgen Rösler (1920–2009), mineralogy professor. He was the author of core teaching texts, including Geochemische Tabellen, 'Geochemical Tables' and Lehrbuch der Mineralogie, 'Mineralogy Textbook'.

== International University Rankings ==
The 2021 QS World University Rankings by subject rated TU Bergakademie Freiberg No. 17 for Mineral and Mining worldwide and No. 3 in Europe. The Center for World University Rankings (CWUR) ranked TU Freiberg 64th among German universities on research performance.
