= First Hundred Years' War =

Capetian-Plantagenet conflicts (1159–1259)

- Part of the Anglo-French Wars
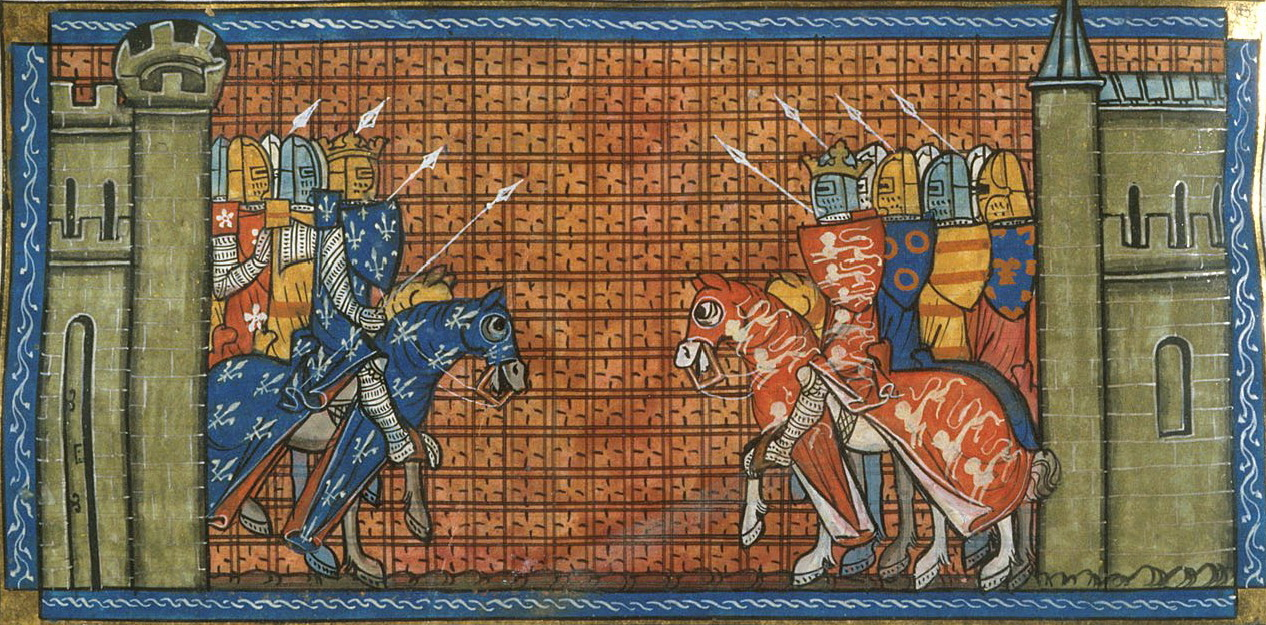
- An illumination from a 14th century AD manuscript of the "Grandes Chroniques de France", depicting a battle between John I of England (r. 1199 – 1216 AD) and Philip II of France (r. 1180 – 1223 AD). Both kings are recognizable by their coats of arms; Philip II is identified by three pale gold fleur-de-lis on a blue field, while John wears three pale gold lions on a red field.
Date	June 1159 – 4 December 1259 (intermittent) (Note: June 1159 is the approximated month in which Henry II of England launched his expedition into Toulouse. The Treaty of Paris (1259) was signed on December 4 1259, after which the Plantagenet claim to the Angevin Empire was relinquished.) (100 years and 5 months)
Location	France, England
Result	Capetian (French) victory
Territorial changes	The Kingdom of France acquires Normandy, Maine, Anjou, Touraine, Poitou, Thouars, Saintonge, Angoumois, Auvergne and Berry.

Belligerents
Kingdom of France	Angevin Empire: Kingdom of England; Duchy of Normandy; Duchy of Aquitaine; County of Anjou
County of Toulouse (Until 1196); County of Flanders (Until 1197); Duchy of Brittany (Until 1166; 1204–1228); Kingdom of Scotland (After 1173); Army of God and Holy Church; County of Blois; County of La Marche (1224–1226); County of Poitou (from 1241)	Holy Roman Empire; Kingdom of Scotland (Until 1173); County of Toulouse (1241–1243); County of Flanders (From 1197); Duchy of Brittany (1166–1204; 1228–1234); County of Boulogne; County of La Marche (1226–1242); County of Dammartin

Commanders and leaders
Louis VII; Philip II Augustus; Louis VIII; Louis IX; Raymond V of Toulouse; Raymond VI of Toulouse; William the Lion; Theobald V de Blois; Alphonse of Poitiers; Philip I de Flanders; Henry the Young King; Robert, Lord of Champignelles; Robert Fitzwalter; Saer de Quincy; Gilbert de Clare; Henry de Bohun; Thomas, Count of Perche; Savari de Aquitaine	Henry II; Richard the Lionheart; John Lackland; Henry III; Otto IV; Richard of Cornwall; William Marshal; Mercadier; Malcolm IV of Scotland; Ferrand of Flanders; Renaud of Boulogne; Raymond VII; William Longespée Earl of Salisbury; Simon de Montfort; Hugh X de Lusignan; William d'Aubigny; Hugh d'Aubigny; Roger de Lacy; Robert de Beaumont-Leicester; Savari de Mauléon

The First Hundred Years' War (French: Première Guerre de Cent Ans; 1159–1259) was a series of conflicts and disputes during the High Middle Ages in which the House of Capet, rulers of the Kingdom of France, fought the House of Plantagenet (also known as the House of Anjou or the Angevins), rulers of the Kingdom of England. The conflict emerged over the fiefs in France held by the Angevins, which at their peak covered around half of the territory of the French realm. The struggle between the two dynasties resulted in the gradual conquest of these fiefs by the Capetians and their annexation to the French crown lands, as well as subsequent attempts by the House of Plantagenet to retake what they believed to be their rightful ancestral claims in western France.

While not a widely used term, "First Hundred Years’ War" is the designation most often applied to this period, referring retrospectively to the Anglo-French conflicts preceding the more widely recognized Hundred Years' War (1337–1453). These conflicts are often seen as a precursor to the latter, involving many of the same belligerents and dynasties. Like the Hundred Years' War, this conflict was not a single war, but rather a historiographical periodisation to encompass dynastic conflicts centered around the dispute over the Angevin Empire.

== Overview ==
=== Origins ===
During the conflict, the continental possessions of the Kings of England were considered more important than their insular ones, covering a significantly greater area than the territories controlled directly by the Kings of France, who nonetheless remained the overlords of the former with regard to those continental lands. While the Capetian kings’ nominal suzerainty extended far beyond their small domain of Île-de-France, their actual power over many vassals, especially the Plantagenets, was limited. Both dynasties sought to strengthen their positions, not only through territorial consolidation but also through occasional claims to royal titles: Henry II initially hoped to secure the French throne for his son Henry the Young King before the birth of Philip Augustus, and a generation later Philip’s own son, Louis VIII, would assert a claim to the English crown during the First Barons’ War. These ambitions, combined with the Plantagenets’ control of the sovereign kingdom of England, intensified the rivalry and helped define the underlying causes of the conflict.

=== Time frame ===
Although the time frame of the conflict is generally accepted to be from the beginning of the '40 years war' in 1159 to the 1259 Treaty of Paris, a few preliminary and residual instances of conflict had occurred between the two dynasties such as the Capetian invasion of Plantagenet-held Duchy of Aquitaine in 1152, or during the Gascon War starting in 1294, which were both initiated for mostly the same underlying reasons as are seen for the rest of the conflict. They are, however, both relatively minor, and the latter conflict is sufficiently distant in time to be considered separate from the overall conflict. It is also reasonable to extend the start of the conflict to 1154, when the formation of the Angevin Empire can be seen as the true root of the conflict, rather than the dispute over Toulouse, which merely served as the justification for military action. The Hundred Year's War from 1337 to 1453 is also not accepted as part of the same conflict due to the differing casus belli used to initiate the war, and the fact that the two families involved were cadet branches of the Capetian, and eventually, Plantagenet dynasties (Valois and Lancastrian respectively).

The conflict can generally be divided into three distinct phases. The first phase saw the Angevin Empire maintaining dominance over their Capetian rivals. In the second phase, the Angevin Empire experienced a sudden collapse at the hands of the Capetians, culminating in a Capetian invasion of England. The third phase occurred with the Capetian kings now dominant on the continent, while the Plantagenets sought to reclaim the Angevin Empire through various means. It also included residual, more localised conflicts along the borderlands of the Plantagenets’ remaining continental possessions.

=== Warfare ===
The conflict occurred during a period when the majority of warfare was characterised by sieges, siege assaults, siege reliefs, raids, and skirmishes. This was largely due to two factors: the feudal structure of both kingdoms which hindered the formation of professional standing armies, and the defensive advantage provided by the widespread presence of castles. Consequently, warfare was more localised in nature and large pitched battles were relatively rare due to their typically decisive outcomes. This is best observed in the Vexin, where much of the early fighting took place, resulting in the construction of a dense network of castles on both sides, including the famous Château Gaillard. However, this did not lessen the brutality or the death toll. In fact, this style of conflict spread the burden of war across a broader spectrum of society, impacting people of various statuses.

While soldiers were often drawn from more distant regions, most combat involved the immediate stakeholders—local nobility and populace alike. As the Plantagenets lost territory on the continent, their ability to wage war became increasingly strained. They had to rely on hired mercenaries for deeper offensive campaigns into France. This is all in contrast to the later 'second' Hundred Years' War, during which the infantry revolution gained momentum, allowing for pitched battles to become more common, and the growing use of gunpowder began to undermine the strategic importance of castles.

=== Significance ===
The significance of the conflict is often viewed in the context of the later Hundred Years' War, which spanned from 1337 to 1453. Ironically, the intermarriages between the two dynasties—resulting from various peace settlements from the conflict—played a direct role in the Plantagenets' dynastic claim to the French throne, ultimately triggering the more famous Hundred Years' War. The French invasion of England in 1216 also played a significant role in the rise of English nationalism, reinforcing a collective identity that distinguished the English from their French adversaries. The enduring fear of another French invasion in the 14th century further galvanised the lower classes, prompting widespread military preparedness, particularly in the use of the longbow, as a means of defending the realm.

After the Plantagenet claims to western France ended with the Treaty of Paris in 1259, the English kings, in regards to their few remaining possessions on the continent, would remain vassals to the French kings and would become more English in nature. The Capetians were also able to consolidate their power, making the kingdom of France the wealthiest and most powerful state in medieval Western Europe.

== Angevin ascendancy under Henry II: 1154–1189 ==
=== Formation of the Angevin Empire ===
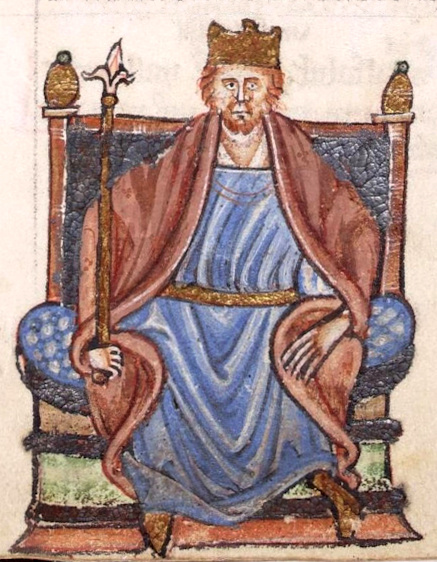
Contemporary miniature of Henry II from the Topographia Hibernica, c. 1186 – c. 1188

In 1150, amidst a period of civil war in England over the succession of the crown known as the Anarchy, Henry II Plantagenet, a claimant to the throne by right of his mother Empress Matilda, received the Duchy of Normandy from his father Geoffrey V, Count of Anjou. In response to the looming threat of a united England, Normandy, and Anjou, Louis VII Capet of France put forward King Stephen of England's son, Eustace, as a pretender to the duchy of Normandy and launched a military campaign to remove Henry from the province. Peace was made in 1151 in which Henry accepted Louis as his feudal lord in response for recognition as the duke of Normandy.

When Geoffrey died in September 1151, Henry inherited the County of Anjou and Maine. On 18 May 1152 he became Duke of Aquitaine in right of his wife by marrying Eleanor of Aquitaine in Poitiers after her first marriage with Louis VII of France was annulled at the Council of Beaugency. As a result of this union, Henry had now possessed a larger proportion of France than Louis. Tensions between the two were revived. Louis organised a coalition against Henry including Stephen of England and Henry's younger brother Geoffrey, among a group of other nobles in France. Fighting broke out along the borders of Normandy, and Louis launched a campaign into Aquitaine. In England, Stephen laid siege to Wallingford Castle which was held by Henry's forces at the time. Henry responded by stabilising the Norman border, pillaging the Vexin and then striking south into Anjou against Geoffrey, capturing the castle of Montsoreau. Louis soon fell ill and withdrew the campaign, and Geoffrey was forced to come to terms with Henry.

On 6 November 1153, by the Treaty of Wallingford (or Treaty of Winchester), he was recognised as the successor of King Stephen of England. When the latter died on 25 October 1154, he ascended the throne of England under the name of Henry II. On Sunday 19 December he was crowned at Westminster Abbey. This marked the beginning of what is referred to by historians in the modern day as the Angevin Empire.

In 1156, Henry II expanded his power by seizing the Viscounty of Thouars, securing the vital communications route between his northern and southwestern lands. Two years later, in 1158, he annexed Nantes from the semi-independent Duchy of Brittany, tightening his grip on the region. The resources at the disposal of Henry now far exceeded those of the king of France. That same year, Henry sought to strengthen his family’s position in France by arranging a marriage between his eldest son, Henry the Young King, and Margaret of France, the daughter of Louis VII and his second wife, Constance of Castile. The match, confirmed in the Treaty of Gisors, included the Vexin, a strategically crucial frontier territory containing the castle of Gisors, as Margaret’s dowry. The agreement gave Henry direct control of the Vexin, to Louis’s alarm, and raised the prospect that the Young King might one day inherit the French throne, since Louis then lacked a male heir.

=== Outbreak of the Forty Years' War ===
The Angevin Empire in 1154 in shades of red, the Crown lands of France (Ile-de-France) in dark blue

In 1159, Henry claimed the County of Toulouse in right of his wife Eleanor of Aquitaine, descended from the earlier dukes of Aquitaine who had once controlled the county. The struggle over Toulouse soon brought the two monarchs into open confrontation. Henry gathered one of the largest armies of the age at Poitiers, drawing forces from England, Normandy, Anjou, Aquitaine, and Gascony, with reinforcements from Thierry of Flanders and King Malcolm IV of Scotland. His allies, the Trencavels and Ramon Berenguer IV of Barcelona, Count of Provence, pressed on Toulouse from the south, while Henry himself besieged the city. The siege ended abruptly when Louis VII entered Toulouse with a small escort to support his brother-in-law Raymond V, Count of Toulouse; Henry, unwilling to attack his feudal overlord directly, withdrew. Nonetheless, he seised Cahors and several castles in the Garonne valley in Quercy. The ensuing contest over Toulouse earned the label of the “forty years’ war” in later chronicles.

The dynastic balance shifted after Constance’s death in October 1160, when Louis married Adela of Champagne, thereby consolidating alliances with Theobald V of Blois and Odo II of Burgundy in 1160. Despite initial attempts to repair relations, diplomacy broke down. Henry seized the Vexin and forced a marriage between Young Henry and Margaret, angering Louis. Theobald V, Count of Blois, mobilised his forces on behalf of Louis, however, Henry responded with a surprise attack on Chaumont, capturing Theobald's castle after a successful siege. Henry mounted another campaign into Toulouse in 1161, but withdrew again, leaving the fighting to his allies, including Alfonso II of Aragon and the Archbishop of Bordeaux. Another peace was negotiated in the autumn of 1161, followed by a second peace treaty in 1162 overseen by Pope Alexander III.

The rivalry continued across France. In 1164, Henry seized lands along the Norman–Breton frontier, and in 1166 he invaded Brittany outright, forcing Duke Conan IV to abdicate and betrothing Conan's daughter Constance to his son Geoffrey, thereby securing the duchy for the Angevin dynasty. Meanwhile, Louis the gained the support of Philip, Count of Flanders, who feared the growth of Angevin power. In 1169, further negotiations took place at the Conference of Montmirail, where Henry attempted to formalise the division of his empire among his sons. At this meeting, his son Richard was betrothed to Louis’s daughter Alys, and Henry’s heirs performed homage to the French king for their projected continental inheritances. Though this seemed to affirm Louis’s overlordship, he used the situation to encourage rivalries among Henry’s sons, rather than to stabilise relations. In 1165 the birth of Adela’s son, the future Philip II Augustus, restored his confidence by ensuring the French crown would remain within the Capetian line

Hostilities again broke out in the late 1160s. In 1167, a quarrel over the collection of funds for the Crusader States led Louis to ally with the Welsh, Scots, and Bretons, and to launch attacks into Normandy. Henry countered by attacking Chaumont-sur-Epte, site of Louis’s main arsenal, burning the town and forcing Louis to withdraw and accept a truce. In 1170, Henry continued his campaign against Brittany and struck again in Berry, attacking Bourges. Louis retaliated with a raid into the Vexin, compelling Henry to move north and abandon his advance, which allowed Louis to relieve the city.

The dynastic and territorial contests culminated in 1173, when Raymond V of Toulouse, after years of conflict, finally submitted at Limoges, paying homage to Henry II and his sons for Toulouse. By this stage, Henry’s network of alliances had expanded still further, with his daughter Eleanor married to Alfonso VIII of Castile in 1170 (with Gascony as her dowry) and his son John betrothed in 1173 to Alicia, daughter of Humbert III of Savoy. Louis VII, although he enjoyed prestige as the protector of Archbishop Thomas Becket during the latter’s exile in France between 1164 and his murder in 1170, proved unable to check the expansion of Angevin influence.

=== Revolt over the Angevin inheritance ===
Although Henry II wielded much stronger authority within his lands and commanded far greater resources than his Capetian rivals, there was a considerable division in his territories between his sons. Eager to inherit, his three eldest sons rebelled against him in 1173 with the help of Louis of France. William the Lion of Scotland also turned against Henry and raided the north of England, including Northumberland, Cumberland, and Yorkshire. Young Henry and Louis invaded the Vexin intending to reach the Norman capital, Rouen. Henry, who had been in France in order to receive absolution for the Becket affair, secretly traveled back to England to order an offensive on the rebels and their French allies, and on his return counter-attacked Louis's army, massacring many of them and pushing the survivors back across the Norman border. In January 1174 the forces of Young Henry and Louis attacked again, threatening to push through into central Normandy. The attack failed and the fighting paused while the winter weather set in. Henry returned to England to face a potential invasion by the Flemish. This ruse allowed Philip, Count of Flanders, and Louis to invade Normandy and reach Rouen, laying siege to the city. However, the defeat and capture of William the Lion in the Battle of Alnwick in 1174 allowed Henry to return to Normandy in August. Henry's forces fell upon the French army just before the final French assault on the city began; pushed back into France, Louis requested peace talks, bringing an end to the conflict.

Tension resurfaced between the two kings in the late 1170s over the control of Berry. To put additional pressure on Louis, Henry mobilised his armies for war. The papacy intervened and, probably as Henry had planned, the two kings were encouraged to sign a non-aggression treaty in September 1177, under which they promised to undertake a joint crusade. The ownership of the Auvergne and parts of Berry were put to an arbitration panel, which reported in favour of Henry; Henry followed up this success by purchasing La Marche from the local count. This expansion of Henry's empire once again threatened French security, and promptly put the new peace at risk.

=== Accession of Philip II and end of Henry's reign ===
In 1180, Louis was succeeded by his son, Philip II 'Augustus.' In 1186, Philip demanded that he be given the Duchy of Brittany and insisted that Henry order his son Richard the Lionheart to withdraw from Toulouse, where he had been sent with an army to apply new pressure on Count Raymond, Philip Augustus's uncle. Philip Augustus threatened to invade Normandy if this did not happen and reopened the question of the Vexin. Philip Augustus invaded Berry and Henry mobilised a large army which confronted the French at Châteauroux, before papal intervention brought a truce. During the negotiations, Philip Augustus suggested to Richard that they should ally against Henry, marking the start of a new strategy to divide the father and son.

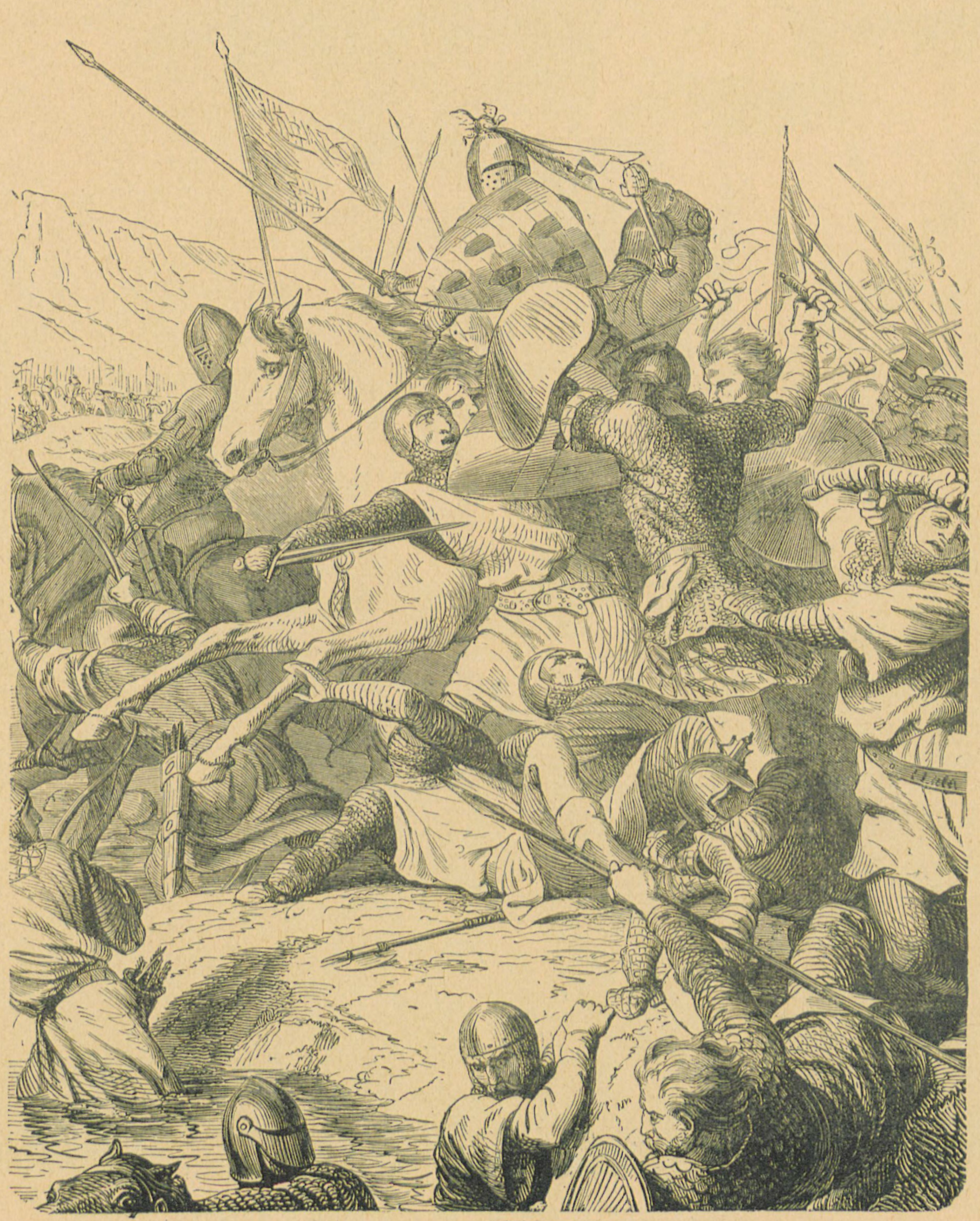
Guillaume II des Barres in the battle of Mantes (c. 1860s French engraving)

In 1187, Richard's renewed campaign into Toulouse undermined the truce between Henry and Philip. Both kings mobilised large forces in anticipation of war. In 1188 the symbolic 'cutting of the elm' took place in which Philip ordered the felling of an elm tree on the Norman border, under which both sides traditionally negotiated, signaling his intent to show no mercy to the English. Likely after this incident, Henry launched a campaign against Philip and advanced toward Mantes, a fortress city northwest of Paris. His forces pillaged several surrounding villages with the apparent aim of besieging the city. Philip, unable to muster his full army in time, confronted the English in the Battle of Soindres (also known as the Battle of Mantes) with a force of about 5,000 men, including the militia of Mantes and local knights. Despite being outnumbered, the French secured the high ground at Pongebœuf and compelled the English to withdraw, after which Philip invaded the Vexin. In a peace conference held in November 1188, Richard publicly changed sides.

In 1189, Philip and Richard launched a surprise attack on Henry. Henry was caught by surprise at Le Mans but made a forced march north to Alençon, from where he could escape into the safety of Normandy. Suddenly, Henry turned back south towards Anjou, against the advice of his officials. At Ballan, the two armies confronted each other once again. Owing to Henry’s failing health, the confrontation led not to any known major military action but to the Treaty of Azay-le-Rideau on 4 July 1189, by which Henry was forced to recognise his son Richard as his sole heir. Two days later, Henry succumbed to his illness, possibly exacerbated by the betrayal of his son John.

== Restoration and Defense of the Angevin Empire under Richard the Lionheart: 1189–1199 ==
=== Philip Augustus' betrayal and first conquest ===
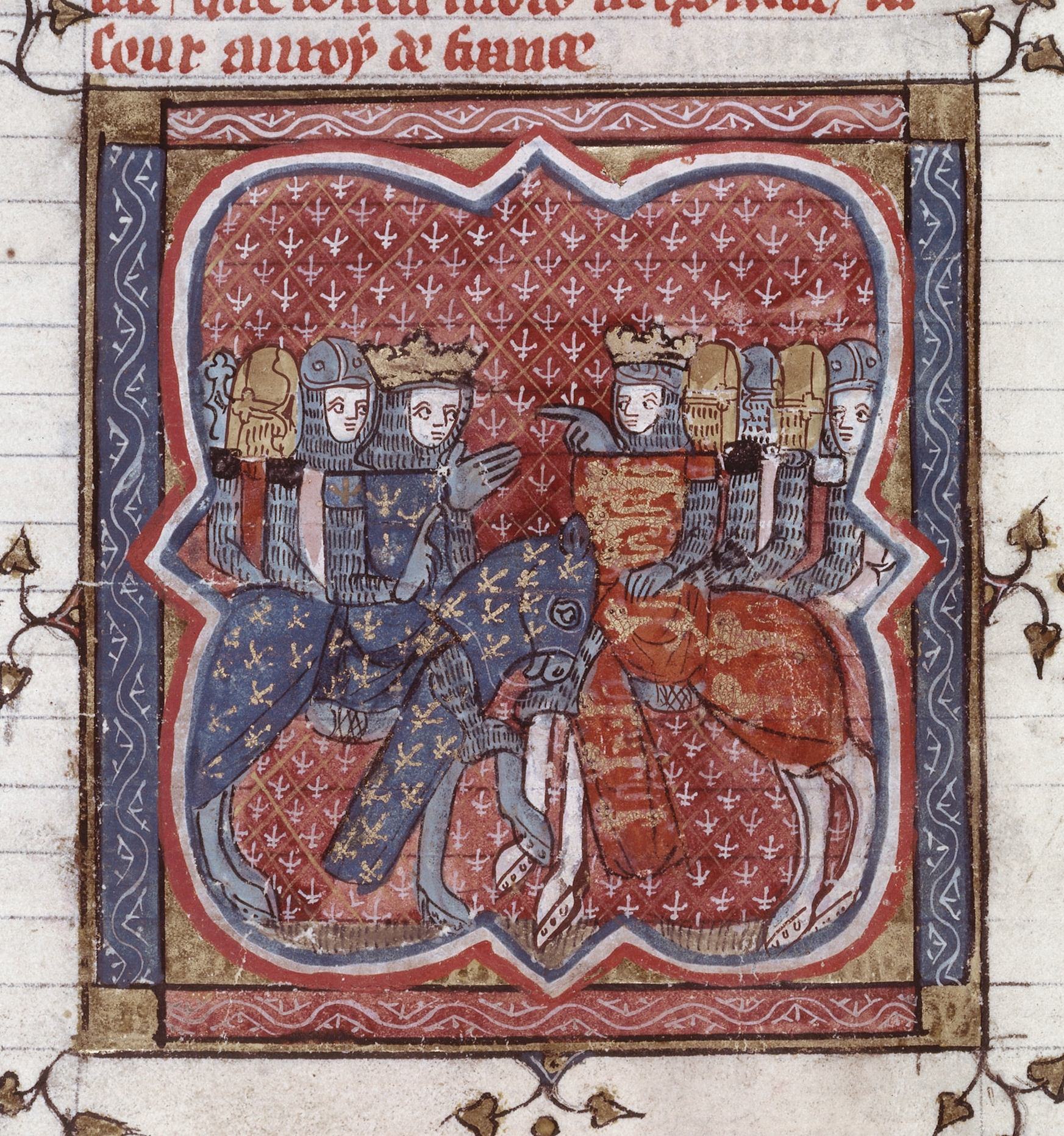
Philip Augustus (left) and Richard the Lionheart (right) at the Third Crusade

In 3 September 1189, Richard the Lionheart was crowned King of England in Westminster Abbey inheriting his father's vast territories and still commanding much more power than the Capetian monarchy, remaining no less a threat to the Capetians. After the coronation, Richard immediately left for the Third Crusade alongside King Philip.

Returning early from the crusade in December 1191, Philip Augustus encouraged the rebellion of John Lackland against his brother Richard and profited from the absence of the latter to negotiate a very advantageous treaty for France. Hoping to acquire the English crown with the support of the King of France, John paid homage in 1193. The Château de Gisors fell to the French in the same year. Then, as Philip Augustus attacked the possessions of the Plantagenets, John gave to the French king eastern Normandy (except Rouen), Le Vaudreuil, Verneuil and Évreux, by written agreement, in January 1194. By his military and diplomatic finesse, Philip kept his rival at bay.

Richard continued the crusade after the departure and seeming betrayal of Philip: he retook the main Palestinian ports up to Jaffa, and restored the Latin Kingdom of Jerusalem although the city itself eluded him. He eventually negotiated a five-year truce with Saladin, likely driven by the urgent matters awaiting him in his own kingdom, and set sail back for England in October 1192. Winter storms overtook him. Forced to stay at Corfu, he was captured by Duke Leopold V of Austria, who put him in the hands of the German Emperor Henry VI, his enemy. Despite Richard's best efforts during a trial convened by Henry, the emperor continued to detain him, possibly at the request of Philip of France. For the release of Richard, the emperor asked for a ransom of 100,000 marks, plus 50,000 marks to help him conquer Sicily.

=== Richard's retaliation against Philip ===
Richard was finally released on 2 February 1194. His mother, Eleanor of Aquitaine, paid two-thirds of the ransom, one hundred thousand marks, the balance to be paid later. Upon his return to England, John was forgiven by his brother and pardoned. Richard's reaction to the Capetian invasion was immediate. Determined to resist Philip's schemes on contested Angevin lands such as the Vexin and Berry, Richard poured all his military expertise and vast resources into the war on the French King. He organised an alliance with his father-in-law, King Sancho VI of Navarre, who raided Philip's lands from the south. In May 1194, at the head of an English army dispatched from Portsmouth, Richard and William Marshal broke Philip's ongoing siege of Verneuil, which was initially promised to Philip by John, and harassed the retreating French army, capturing their siege engines in the process. Philip struck back by sacking the city of Évreux held by John and Robert of Leicester, the latter of which would soon after be captured by the French while attempting to retake his own castle in Pacy.

In the Battle of Fréteval, Richard was able to further push back Philip who barely survived, almost drowning in a river. As a result of this battle, Richard captured a wealth of treasure and numerous written records from Philip, which he secured in the Tower of London and would use against Philip in the wars to come. Richard then moved south to capture Angoulême from an rebellious alliance between Geoffrey de Rancon and the count Ademar of Angouleme. In mid-July, while Richard was distracted with this rebellion, Philip won a thorough victory against an Anglo-Norman army led by John and William d'Aubigny of Arundel who had recently taken Vaudreuil, a key fortress on the Norman border. It was in August 1194 that Richard decreed for a 'nationalised' system of tournaments to be held in England in order to train the knights of his kingdom to be fiercer in war. As the campaign season was drawing to an end, the two kings agreed to the Truce of Tillières.

The war resumed in 1195 when Philip besieged Vaudreuil after learning that Henry VI of the Holy Roman Empire was conspiring with Richard to invade France, effectively nullifying the truce. According to English chroniclers, Richard met with Philip, who appeared to be stalling for time with negotiations while his engineers were secretly undermining the walls. When the walls suddenly collapsed, Richard realised Philip's deception and ordered his forces to attack the French. Philip narrowly escaped, and Richard captured what remained of Vaudreuil.

After the events at Vaudreuil, Richard besieged Arques. Philip now pressed his advantage in northeastern Normandy, where he, at the head of 600 knights, conducted a raid at Dieppe, burning the English ships in the harbor while repulsing an attack by Richard at the same time. Philip now marched southward into the Berry region. His primary objective was the fortress of Issoudun, which had just been captured by Richard's mercenary commander and right hand man, Mercadier. The French king took the town and was besieging the castle when Richard stormed through French lines and made his way in to reinforce the garrison, while at the same time, another army was approaching Philip's supply lines. Against expectation, Richard laid down his arms and negotiated with Philip, paying homage to him in the process. Philip's situation also became precarious as the arriving Angevin reinforcements meant that Richard's forces began to outnumber his own. As a result, Philip gave up most of his recent conquests in the Treaty of Louviers in December 1195. John also captured Gamaches located in the Vexin around this time. During this relatively longer period of peace, Richard began construction on the Château de Gaillard to fortify Normandy from further invasions which was mostly complete by 1198. The castle was ahead of its time, featuring innovations that would be adopted in castle architecture nearly a century later.

=== Later campaigns and Richard’s death ===
Political and military conditions seemed promising for Philip at the start of 1196 when Richard's nephew Arthur I, Duke of Brittany ended up in his hands. In July 1196, Philip besieged Aumâle at the head of a large army, including a contingent led by Count Baldwin of Flanders. Richard countered the maneuver by capturing Nonancourt, then marching to Aumâle to relieve the siege. The English attacked the French at their camp around the castle, but were pushed back. Aumâle would surrender a week later. The year continued to go badly for Richard who was wounded in the knee by a crossbow bolt while besieging Gaillon, and Nonancourt was recaptured following the battle at Aumâle.

However, Philip's fortunes would not last. The situation slowly turned against Philip over the course of the next three years. In October 1196, Richard negotiated with Raymond VI to bring an end to the ongoing 40-year war between Aquitaine and Toulouse, thus securing Richard's southern border. As part of the settlement, Raymond married Richard's sister, Joan. Richard also won over Count Baldwin, switching sides in 1197. The same year, the Holy Roman Emperor Henry VI died and was succeeded by Otto IV, Richard's nephew, who put additional pressure on Philip and threatened an invasion into France. Finally, many Norman lords were switching sides and returning to Richard's camp.

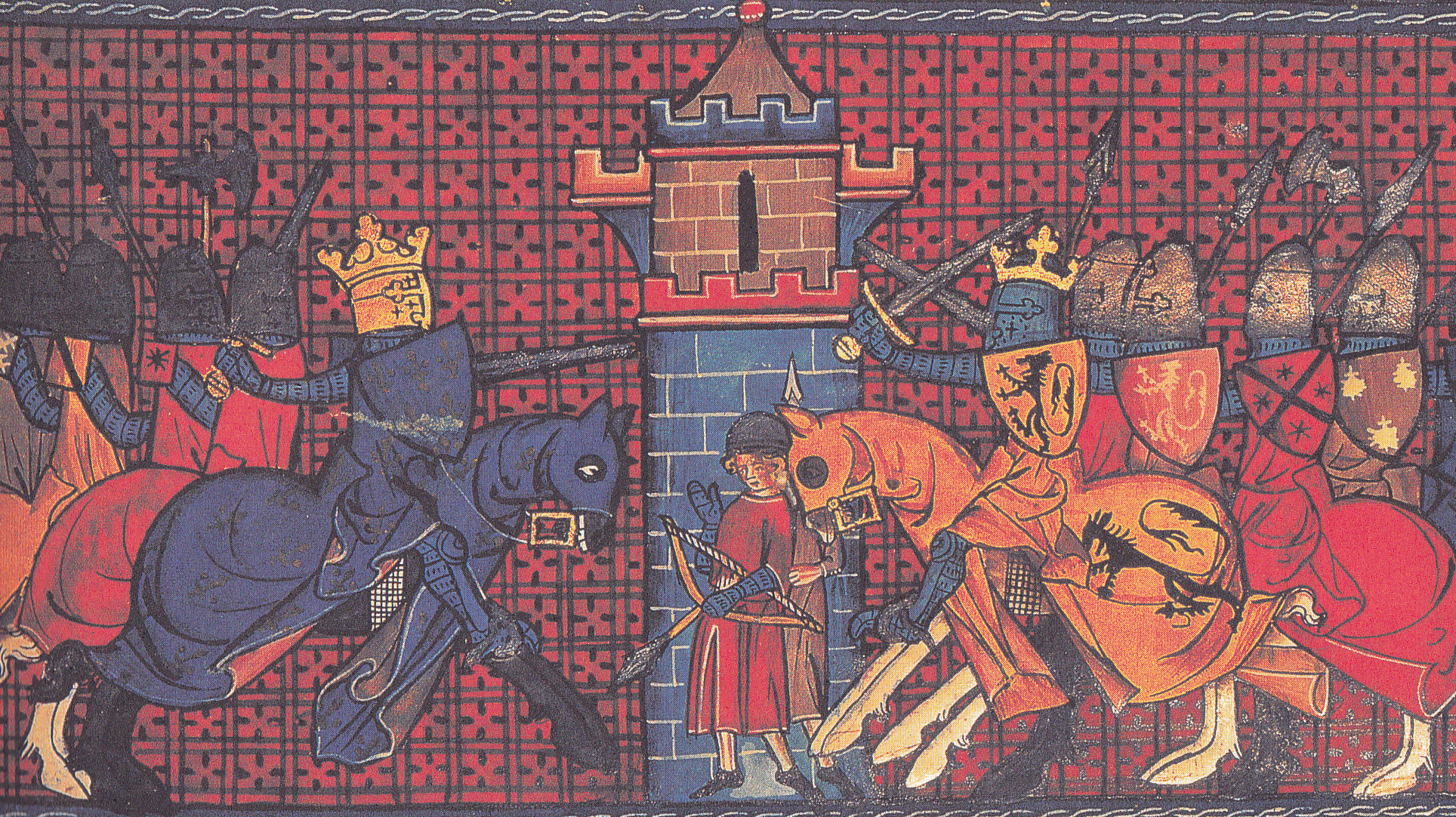
The Battle of Gisors, 1198, between Philip II Augustus (left) and Richard the Lionheart (right) (Chroniques de Saint-Denis (ou de France), 14th century)

In 1197 Richard invaded the Vexin, taking Courcelles-sur-Seine and Boury-en-Vexin before returning to Dangu. Philip, believing that Courcelles was still holding out, went to its relief. Discovering what was happening, Richard decided to attack the French king's forces, catching Philip by surprise, resulting in an English victory at the Battle of Gisors (sometimes called Courcelles). In this battle, Richard reportedly yelled 'Dieu et mon droit' in battle, meaning 'God and my right' signifying that Richard was no longer willing to pay homage to Philip for his domain in France. Philip's forces withdrew and attempted to reach the fortress of Gisors. Bunched together, the French knights with king Philip attempted to cross the Epte River on a bridge that promptly collapsed under their weight, almost drowning Philip in the process. He was dragged out of the river and shut himself up in Gisors, having successfully evaded Richard and reinforced the fortress.

Philip soon planned a new offensive, launching destructive raids into Normandy and again targeting Évreux. Richard countered Philip's thrust with a counterattack in the Vexin, while Mercadier led a raid on Abbeville. The problem was compounded by the Flemish invasion of Artois. By autumn 1198, Richard had regained almost all that had been lost in 1193. With the warring sides in a deadlock, Philip offered a truce so that discussions could begin towards a more permanent peace, with the offer that he would return all of the territories except for Gisors. The new Pope Innocent III, who wanted to set up a new crusade, also pushed the two kings to negotiate.

In mid-January 1199, the two kings with their respective armies met for a final meeting, Richard standing on the deck of a boat, and Philip on his horse on the banks of the Seine River. Shouting terms at each other, they could not reach an agreement on the terms of a permanent truce, but they did agree to further mediation, which resulted in a five-year truce that held. The situation ended abruptly. During the siege of the castle of Châlus held by a rebel garrison in 1199, Richard was hit by another crossbow bolt in the left shoulder, near his neck. He succumbed to his injuries a few days later, on 6 April, forty-one years old and at the height of his glory.

== Conquest of the Angevin Empire under Philip Augustus: 1199–1214 ==
=== Dispute over the Angevin succession ===
John Lackland succeeded his brother Richard. The succession was not unopposed: facing John was his nephew, 12-year-old Arthur of Brittany, son of his elder brother Geoffrey, Duke of Brittany who died in 1186. Philip Augustus supported this rivalry, and while he had taken the position of John against Richard, this time he took the position of Arthur against John. Philip received the homage of Arthur, as Duke of Brittany, in spring 1199 for the counties of Anjou, Maine and Touraine. This allowed him to negotiate from a position of strength with John Lackland; thus the Treaty of Le Goulet was created in 1200 which aimed to settle the claims the Angevin kings of England had on French lands, with the exception of Aquitaine, in order to end the constant dispute over Normandy. The treaty was sealed by the marriage of Louis of France and Blanche of Castile, John's niece.

However, the hostilities did not cease. Philip again took the cause of Arthur, and summoned John his vassal under the Treaty of Le Goulet for his actions in Aquitaine and Tours. John, naturally, did not present himself, and the court of France pronounced the confiscation of his fiefs.

In the spring of 1202 Philip attacked Normandy while Arthur attacked Anjou, but the young duke was surprised by King John in the Battle of Mirebeau, and taken prisoner with his troops as well as his sister Eleanor, Fair Maid of Brittany. Arthur of Brittany disappeared in the following months while in captivity, probably murdered in early 1203. Philip then provided support to vassals of Arthur and resumed his actions in Normandy in spring 1203. Philip ordered Eleanor be released, which John eventually refused. In 1208 when it was believed that Arthur had died, Bretons supported his half-sister Alix to succeed instead of the captive Eleanor, whose claim was supported by John.

Angevin barons were increasingly replacing their allegiance to John to the king of France instead. Most notably, it was in 1203 when Robert I, count of Alençon betrayed John and received Capetian troops after John and his army had passed the city of Alençon while on campaign intending to reach Chinon. This exposed the English army's rearguard, causing much anger in John who specifically denoted this year as 'the year when Count Robert betrayed us' in his documents.

=== Fall of Normandy and Poitou ===
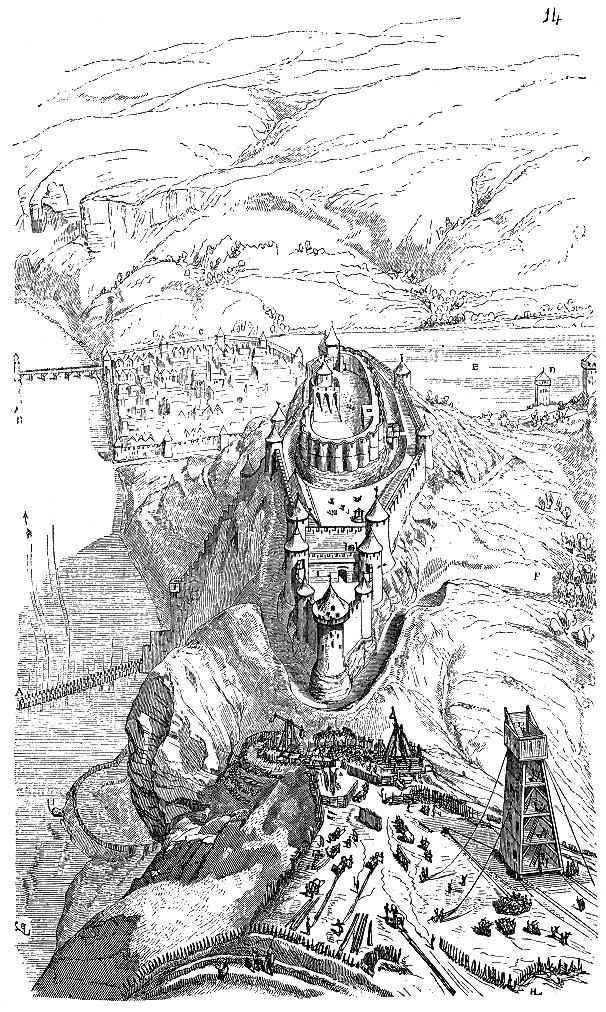
An artists impression of how the siege of Château-Gaillard in 1204 would have looked.

Around the turn of the 13th century, warfare in Normandy was defined by slow but steady advances due to the high density of castles in the region. In September 1203, Philip dismantled the system of Norman castles around Château Gaillard, notably taking Andely after a 5-month long siege and Le Vaudreuil. Once the immediate area around the castle was secured, Philip began the Siege of Château Gaillard. An army led by John of England and William Marshal fell upon the besieging French army in an attempt to relieve the siege. Though the attack was initially successful, the convoluted battle plan led to the English being unable to achieve their objective. The French counterattack routed the English forces, leading John to retreat and invade Brittany instead in order to bait the French into withdrawing from the siege. Philip, understanding the importance of the castle for securing the rest of Normandy, refused to lift the siege. The defending garrison of the castle led by Roger De Lacy continued to stubbornly resist French advances, reportedly going as far as using Greek fire on the enemy, until 6 March 1204 when the attackers finally reached the inner bailey of the castle.

Normandy was now open for the taking. Philip pressed his advantage; Falaise, Caen, Bayeux, and Rouen surrendered 24 June 1204, despairing the aid of John Lackland, who did not come. Arques and Verneuil fell immediately after, completing the success of Philip, who had conquered Normandy in two years of campaign. Philip then turned to the Loire Valley, where he took Poitiers in August 1204, and Loches and Chinon in 1205. The failures of John were not received well by the nobility back in England.

In June 1206, John landed at La Rochelle at the head of an army and with the warm welcome of the local nobility. Having secured Gascony after an earlier invasion in 1205 by Alfonso VIII of Castile, John moved north to probe the defenses of Poitou and Brittany. Philip, being notified of the English army's approach towards Normandy, marched with his own army to Tours where John had now presided. Philip pillaged around the city, offering battle to John, which John refused. John and Philip finally agreed to a 2 year truce in Thouars on 13 October 1206.

=== Consolidation of Capetian conquests ===
For Philip, it was then necessary to stabilise these rapid conquests. Since 1204, Philip published an order imposing the use of Norman, instead of Angevin, currency. Philip Augustus also built the castle of Rouen, an imposing fortress of Philippian style and the locus of Capetian power in Normandy.

Capetian domination was accepted in Champagne, Brittany, and Auvergne, but the counties of Boulogne and Flanders remain reluctant. Renaud de Dammartin, Count of Boulogne, became a primary concern. Despite the favors of Philip Augustus, who married in 1210 his son Philip Hurepel to Matilda, daughter of Renaud, he continued to negotiate with the enemy camp. The suspicions of Philip took shape when the count began to fortify Mortain, in western Normandy. In 1211, Philip went on the offensive, taking Mortain, Aumale and Dammartin. Renaud de Dammartin fled to the county of Bar, and was no longer an immediate threat.

=== Anti-Capetian coalition ===
The incredible success of Philip Augustus soon brought all of his rivals to unite against him. The opposition formed in 1212. John allied with his nephew, Otto IV, Holy Roman Emperor, who was currently facing an internal crisis within the Empire in which the French supported Otto's opposition, Philip of Swabia. Renaud de Dammartin was the real architect of the coalition. He had nothing to lose when he went to Frankfurt to seek the support of Otto and England, where he paid homage to John. Hostilities between Philip and John resumed immediately.

At the same time, the first operations of the Albigensian Crusade, led by French barons, saw the quarrel between Raymond VI, Count of Toulouse and the Crusaders. Philip Augustus refused to intervene and focused on the English danger. He gathered his barons in Soissons on 8 April 1213, ordering his son Louis to lead the expedition against England and won the support of all his vassals, except one, Ferdinand, Count of Flanders, whom he himself had installed two years earlier. Philip then sought further support, particularly with Henry I, Duke of Brabant. After some hesitation, Pope Innocent III on the other hand chose to support John, which provided moral support, but no direct military advantage. The preparations of the conflict persisted: the initial project of Philip, who wanted to invade England, was thwarted when his fleet was attacked by the enemy coalition at the Battle of Damme in May 1213. The following month saw Philip and Louis strive against the counties of Boulogne and Flanders. The northern cities were almost all devastated.

=== 1214 campaign of John Lackland in the west ===
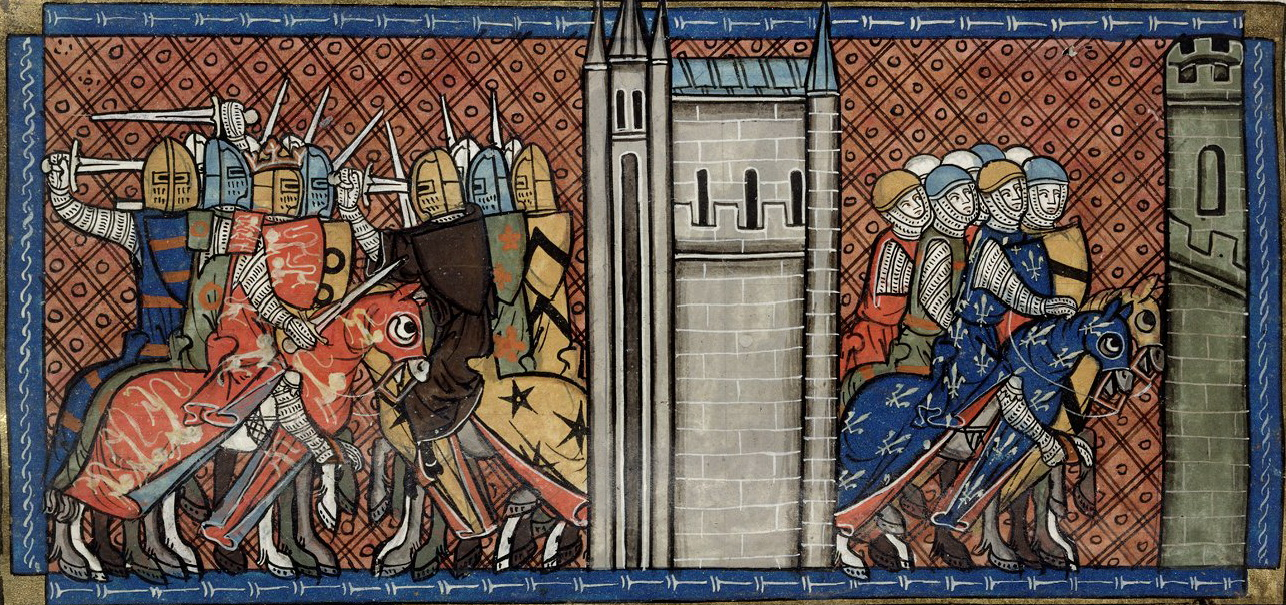
King John of England in battle with the French (left), Prince Louis VIII of France on the march (right). (British Library, Royal 16 G VI f. 385)

John crossed to Aquitaine with his force at a very unusual season. Sailing from Portsmouth, they landed at La Rochelle on 15 February 1214. He called the feudal levies of Guyenne to reinforce him and marched into Poitou, where he was joined by Hugh IX of Lusignan and by Hervé, Count of Nevers. Making a great display of his troops, John overran Poitou in March, then crossed the Loire and invaded Anjou, the ancient patrimony of his house. As he expected, the King of France marched to check the invasion, taking with him his son, Prince Louis, and the pick of the feudal levies of his realm. Moving by Saumur and Chinon, he endeavoured to cut off John's line of retreat towards Aquitaine. However, abandoning Anjou, the English king hastened rapidly southward, and, evading the enemy, reached Limoges on 3 April. By those operations, John had drawn Philip far to the south. Philip, however, refused to pursue John any farther and, after ravaging the revolted districts of Poitou, marched homewards. At Châteauroux, he handed over a few thousand troops to his son and returned with the rest to the north.

John was still determined to tie down as large a force as possible. When he heard Philip had departed, he at once faced about and re-entered Poitou in May. Rapidly passing the Loire, he again invaded Anjou and, after subduing many towns, laid siege to the strong castle of Roche-au-Moines on 19 June. He had lain in front of it for fifteen days when Prince Louis marched to it with his relief army, reinforced by Angevin levies under William des Roches and Amaury I de Craon. However, despite his significantly larger army, the English king was not prepared to fight, as he deemed his Poitevin allies, as well as his hired mercenaries, to be untrustworthy. He recrossed the Loire on 3 July and retreated to La Rochelle, with his rearguard suffering immensely at the hands of the French forces in the process. These actions constituted what is referred to as the Battle of Roche-au-Moines. But the coalition was not yet lost: everything depended on the eastern theatre of the war.

=== Battle of Bouvines ===
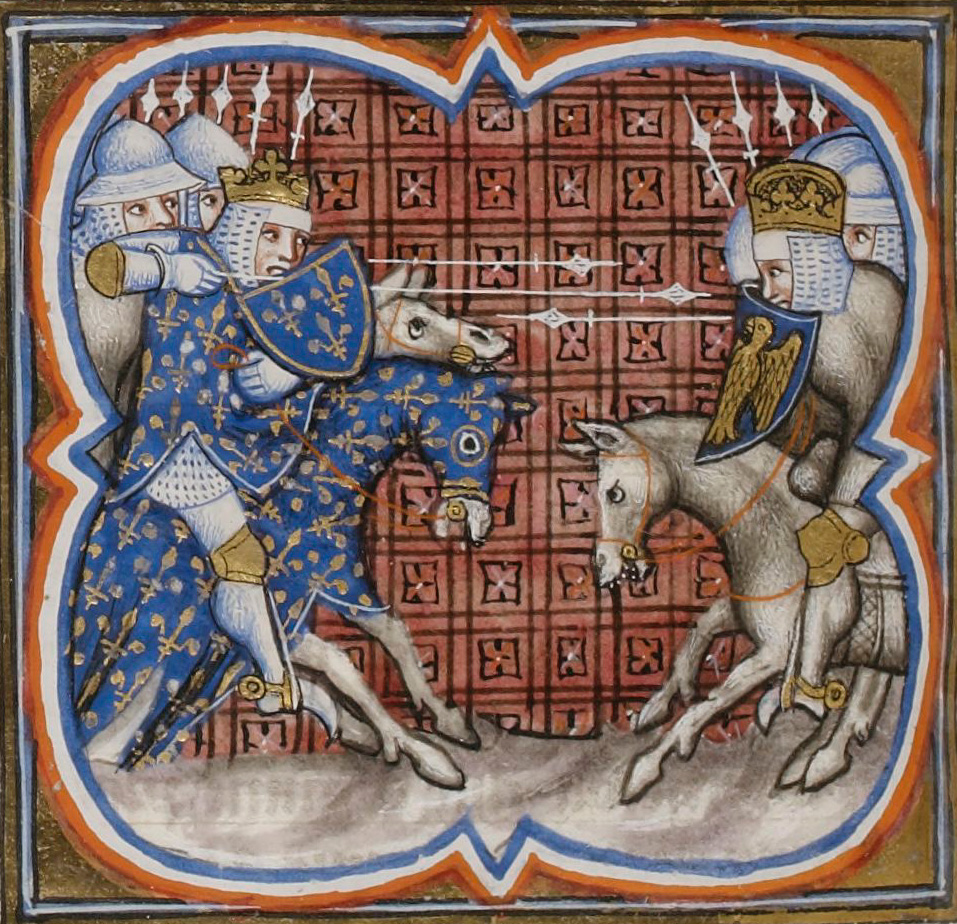
Battle of Bouvines: Philip faces Otto IV (Grandes Chroniques de France, 14th century)

The final confrontation between the armies of Philip and the coalition led by Otto, was now inevitable, after several weeks of approach and avoidance. Otto's army had a sizeable English contingent on the right-wing led by William Longespée, the illegitimate son of Henry II and half brother to John. On Sunday 27 July 1214 the army of Philip, pursued by the coalition, arrived at Bouvines to cross the bridge over the Marque. At that Sunday, the prohibition to fight was absolute for Christians, but Otto decided to go on with the offensive, hoping to surprise the enemy while crossing the bridge.

Philip's army was greatly surprised from the rear, but he quickly reorganised his troops before they could be engaged on the bridge. They quickly turned against the coalition. The French right wing fought against the Flemish knights, led by Ferdinand. At the center where fiercest of the fighting occurred, Philip and Otto fought in person. In the cavalry melee, Philip was unseated, and he fell, but his knights protected him, offered him a fresh horse, and the king resumed the assault until Otto ordered a retreat. Finally, on the left, the supporters of Philip ended the career of Renaud de Dammartin who was leading the knights from Brabant, as well as Longespée, both of whom were captured by the French after a long resistance. Fate had turned in favor of Philip, despite the numerical inferiority of his troops. The victory was decisive: the Emperor fled, Philip's men captured 130 prisoners, including five counts, including the reviled traitor, Renaud of Dammartin, and the Count of Flanders, Ferdinand.

=== Capetian success ===
The coalition was dissolved after its defeat. On 18 September 1214, in Chinon, Philip signed a truce for five years. John returned to England in 1214. By the Treaty of Chinon, John Lackland abandoned all his possessions to the north of the Loire: Berry, Touraine, Maine and Anjou returned to the royal domain, which then covered a third of France, greatly enlarged and free from external threat. John acknowledged Alix as duchess of Brittany and gave up the claim of Eleanor. The Capetian royal domain and the vast area north of the Loire enjoyed repose under the terms of the truce concluded in Chinon in 1215; originally for five years and then extended in 1220 with the guarantee of Louis, an association which marked the beginning of Philip's transition to his son and heir.

== Invasion of England and further conquests in France under Louis the Lion: 1215–1224 ==
=== Intervention in the First Barons' War ===
In 1215, a civil war broke out in England after efforts to reach a settlement between King John and his barons over the limitation of royal authority, embodied in Magna Carta, had failed. The conflict quickly turned into a dynastic war for the throne of England involving the Capetians. The rebellious barons turned to Louis 'the Lion' of France, the son and heir apparent of Philip Augustus and the grandson-in-law of Henry II of England, to lead their cause and take the English crown from John.

Despite discouragement from Philip and the Pope Innocent III, Louis led an expedition to attempt the conquest of England. At the head of numerous troops (1,200 knights, plus many English rebels), Louis landed in Kent in May 1216. John and his loyalist army, having received the news of the invasion, immediately decided to fall back to Winchester. Louis was therefore able to enter London with little resistance where he was subsequently proclaimed (though not crowned) king of England at St Paul's Cathedral. Many nobles gathered to give homage to him, including Alexander II of Scotland, who held fiefs in England. Despite the warm welcome to Louis by a majority of English bishops, the support of the pope to John remained firm, and Louis was excommunicated.

Pursuing John, Louis led his army south from London on 6 June, arriving the following day in Reigate where he found the castle abandoned. He moved onwards to Guildford Castle on 8 June, which surrendered immediately. Farnham Castle initially closed its gates but surrendered as the French started to lay siege. He met resistance only when he reached Winchester Castle on 14 June, but it fell after a ten-day siege. Louis's campaign continued, and by July about a third of England had fallen under his control.

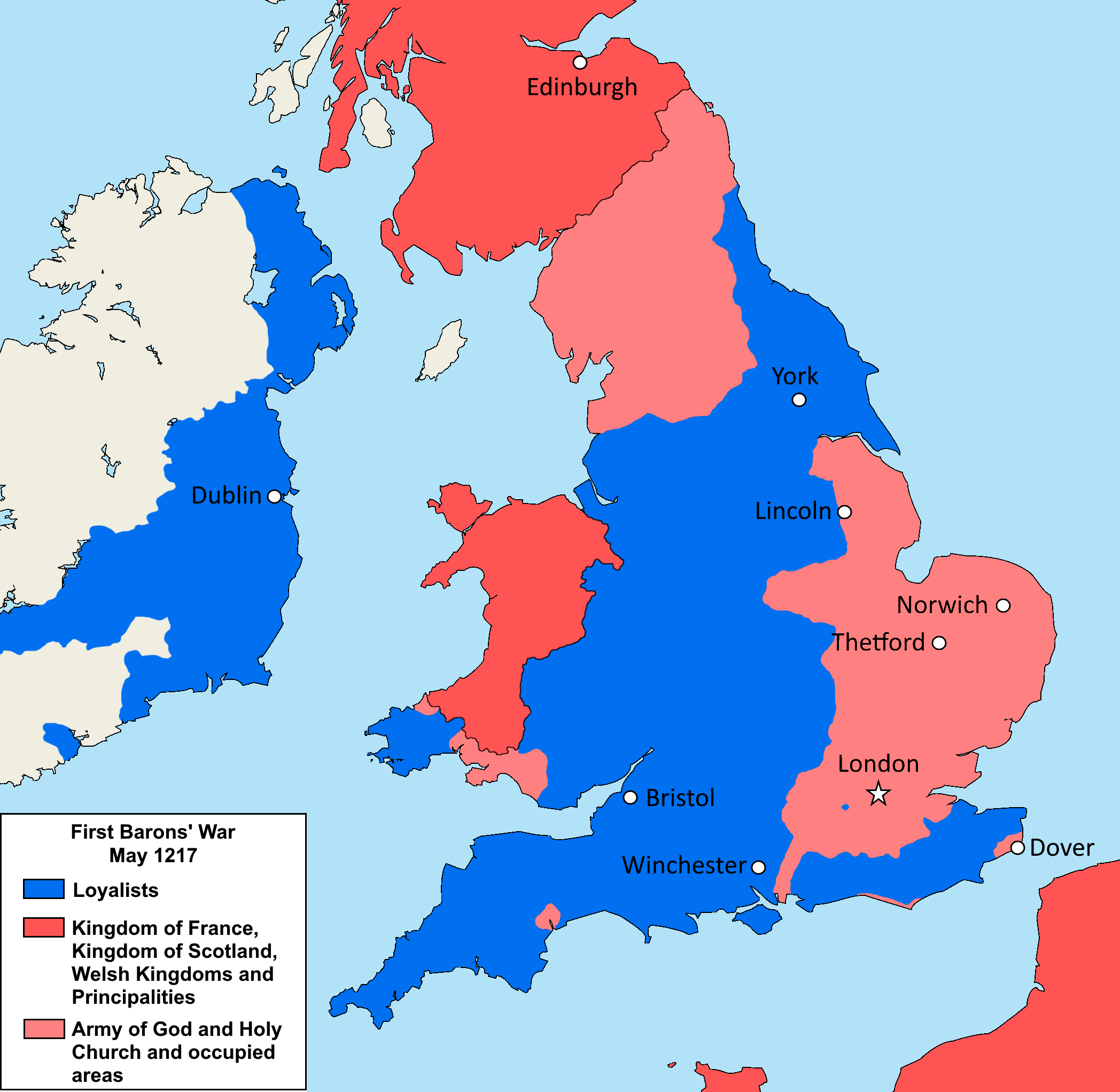
The extent of the French, Scottish, Welsh, and rebel occupation of England in May 1217 during the First Barons' War. Louis the Lion's occupation can be seen in the south-east, overlapping London, in light red.

Despite a hard-fought and bloody victory by John over the rebel barons at the siege of Rochester Castle in November 1215, the fortress, along with Canterbury Castle and the rest of Kent, had fallen to Louis by early 1216. Philip Augustus taunted Louis for trying to conquer England without first seizing its key port at Dover. However, when Louis moved on to Dover Castle on 25 July, it was prepared. Its constable, Hubert de Burgh, had a well-supplied garrison of men. The first siege of Dover began on 19 July, with Louis taking the high ground to the north of the castle. His men successfully undermined the barbican and attempted to topple the castle gate, but de Burgh's men managed to repel the invaders, blocking the breach in the walls with giant timbers.

=== English resurgence ===
Louis's occupation of Kent and the Southeast of England was being undermined by a guerrilla force of Wealden archers raised and led by William of Cassingham, killing many thousands of French invaders according to Roger of Wendover. After three months spent besieging Dover and a large part of his forces being diverted by the siege, Louis called a truce on 14 October and returned to London. Apart from Dover, the only castle to hold out against Louis was Windsor Castle, where at least 60 loyalist knights survived a two-month siege.

Finally, John died suddenly of illness on 19 October 1216. The former allies of John then hastily crowned his son Henry III, aged nine. Pope Innocent III also just died, but his successor Pope Honorius III continued to defend the loyalists. The bishops soon withdrew their support from Louis and the rebels. Her claim to the throne being ignored, Eleanor of Brittany remained under house arrest.

On 6 December 1216 Louis took Hertford Castle but allowed the defending knights to leave with their horses and weapons. He then took Berkhamsted Castle in late December, which again allowed the royal garrison to withdraw honourably with their horses and weapons.

In early 1217, the prince decided to return to France for reinforcements. He had to fight his way to the south coast through William of Cassingham's loyalist resistance in Kent and Sussex, losing part of his force in an ambush at Lewes, with the remainder pursued to Winchelsea and were saved from starvation only by the arrival of a French fleet. Once Louis had departed from England, William and Oliver fitz Regis attacked and burned the remaining French camp at Dover, forcing Louis to establish his logistical base of operations at Sandwich instead.

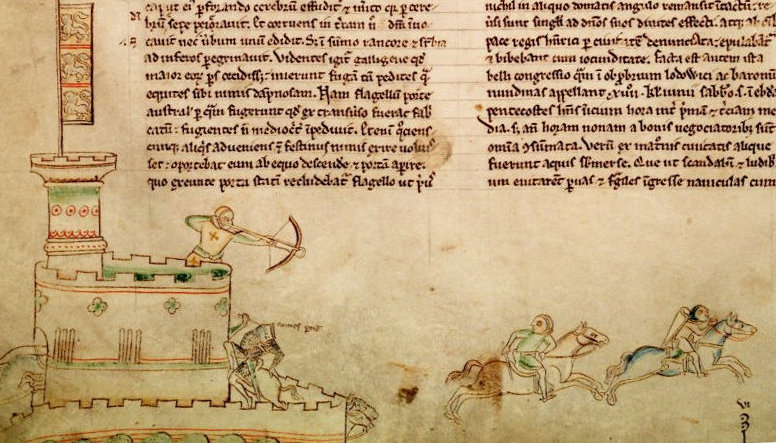
An illustration by Matthew Paris accompanying an account of the Second Battle of Lincoln

Upon his return to England, Louis' forces were decisively routed by William Marshal's troops at the Battle of Lincoln. The French attempted to send more reinforcements and supplies across the English Channel, but were obliterated in another decisive battle in the Battle of Sandwich. Louis agreed to negotiate peace in June and renounced his claims to the throne of England by the Treaty of Lambeth on 11 September 1217, while getting in return a large sum of money and reconciliation with the Church.

=== French supremacy in the later reign of Philip Augustus ===
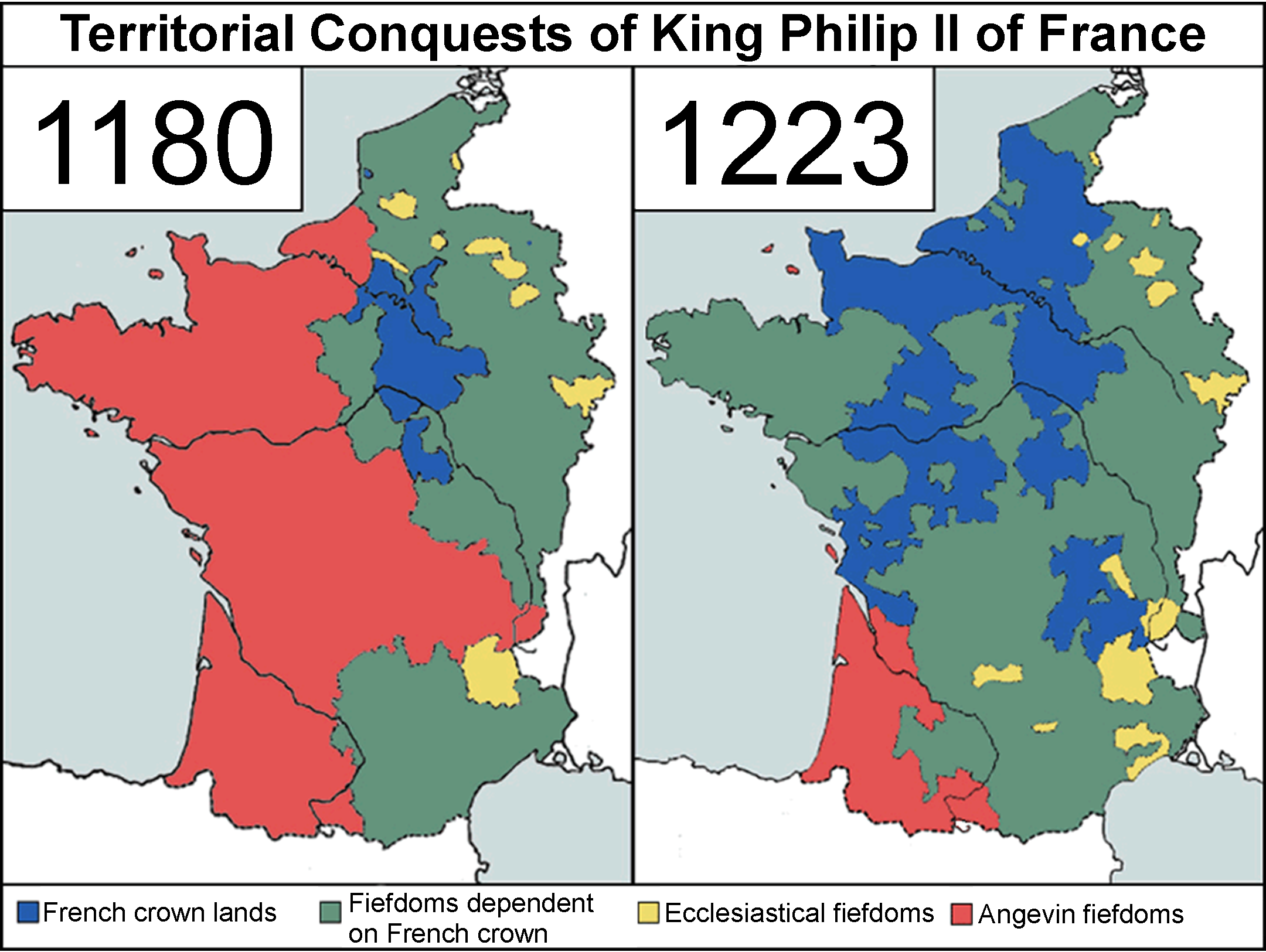
Territorial evolution of France under Philip Augustus

If the conquests by arms ceased, Philip nevertheless extended his influence by taking advantage of problematic cases of inheritance. This was the case in Champagne on the accession of Theobald IV, which allowed him to reestablish his suzerainty. This was the case especially when the king recovered certain lands such as Issoudun, Bully, Alençon, Clermont-en-Beauvaisis and Ponthieu.

The prosperity of the kingdom at the end of the reign of Philip Augustus is an established fact. It is estimated the annual surplus of the treasury was 25,210 livres in November 1221. On that date, the Treasury had in its coffers 157,036 livres, more than 80% of the total ordinary annual income of the monarchy. The testament of Philip Augustus, written in September 1222, confirms these figures, since the sum of its legacy amounted to 790,000 livres of Paris, nearly four years of revenue. This will was written while Philip was in a poor state of health and feared death. It will eventually occur ten months later.

While he was in Pacy, Philip decided to attend an ecclesiastical assembly in Paris to prepare for a new crusade against the advice of his doctors. He did not survive the fatigue of travel and died on 14 July 1223 at Mantes. His body was brought to Paris, and his funeral was quickly organised, in Saint-Denis, in the presence of the great men of the kingdom. For the first time, the body of the King of France dressed in all the regalia is exposed for the veneration of the people before his burial in a solemn rite based on that of the kings of England.

=== Poitou War ===
Now crowned king of France, Louis VIII 'the Lion' claimed that the English court had not fulfilled all the conditions of the treaty of 1217. Taking advantage of the minority of Henry III, he decided to seize the last English possessions in France starting with Poitou. On 24 June 1224, Louis gathered his army at Tours, before moving to Montreuil-Bellay. In response, Geoffrey de Neville was sent from England with a small force, including at least 15 knights of the royal household, and likely many more foot soldiers, as well as 2000 marks as reinforcement to the County of Poitou, reaching Poitou in June.

Henry's army in the region was poorly supplied and lacked support from the Poitevin barons, many of whom felt abandoned during the years of Henry's minority; as a result, much of the province fell fairly quickly. Striking south, Louis secured the smaller Poitevin towns, taking Niort on 5 July after a two-day confrontation with a garrison under the command of Savari de Mauléon who subsequently retreated to the strategic port city of La Rochelle. The city was, as Matthew Paris described, 'the key' to the region, and 'the port ... where kings of England and knights for the defence of these regions were accustomed to disembark.' As such, the defenses of La Rochelle were formidable; even Philip Augustus failed to conquer the city in 1204.

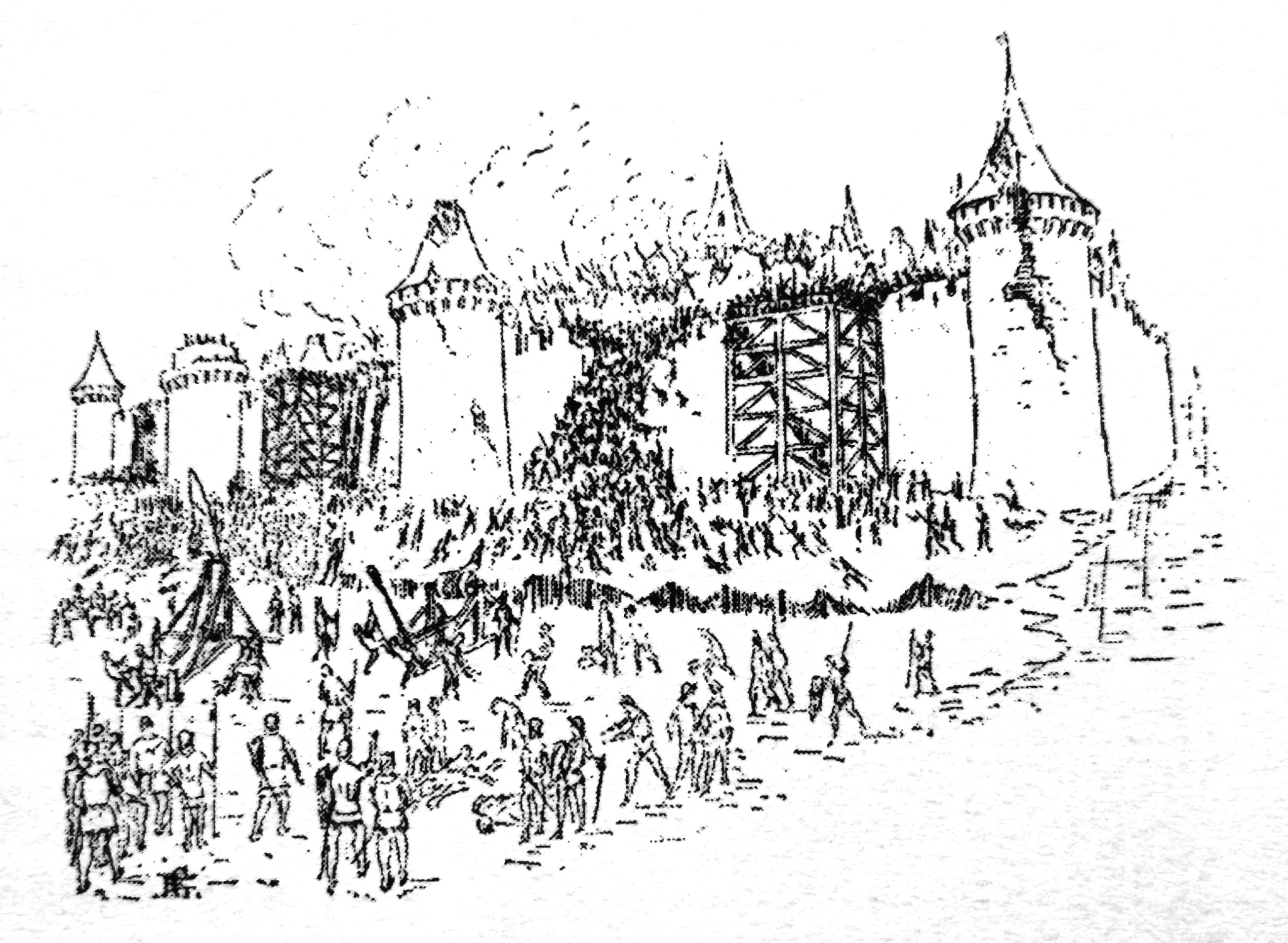
The siege as imagined by Emile Couneau, 1904

To consolidate control over the region, the French laid siege to La Rochelle on 15 July where Savari de Mauléon and Geoffrey de Neville had combined forces to defend the city. Expecting Henry of England to return with a relief force, the city's citizenry hoped to hold out at least until Christmas of that year. The garrison defended the city with vigor. However, it soon became clear that Henry would not come to the city's aid as the king focused his attention and directed the bulk of his finances towards the ongoing siege of Bedford in England instead. This accelerated the citizens submission and surrender to Louis on 3 August, followed by the city's burgesses on August 13, despite the garrison's unwillingness to take part in the surrender. Despite this, Louis allowed the garrison to leave the city in peace with their arms.

Following the Capetian conquest of Poitou, Louis extended his advance into Gascony. English authority in the duchy had collapsed in many areas, particularly along the Garonne and Dordogne valleys, and the strategic fortress of La Réole had become the principal French base in the region. It was in the midst of these victories, in addition to the French king's growing wealth in proportion to that of the king of England's, that Louis ridiculed Henry as a 'boy and a pauper' with easy confidence. Savari now found himself with conflicting obligations, and agreed to enter the service of the king of France by Christmas of that year.

== Efforts to restore the Angevin Empire and final settlement under Henry III: 1225–1259 ==
=== Reclamation of Gascony ===
In the aftermath of the loss of Poitou and La Rochelle to Louis VIII of France in 1224, Gascony was the only substantial continental possession still maintaining any semblance of direct English control. Its loyalty was fragile: a number of towns and castles accepted French overlordship and received Capetian garrisons. The mayor of Bordeaux appealed urgently to Henry III for aid.

In February 1225, a parliament of magnates and prelates granted Henry a tax on movables to finance the defence of Gascony. In return the king re-issued Magna Carta and the Charter of the Forest, establishing a precedent that extraordinary taxation required consent. The expedition was entrusted to Henry’s younger brother, Richard of Cornwall, who was formally appointed seneschal of Gascony. He was accompanied by experienced commanders such as William Longespée and Geoffrey de Neville. However, Geoffrey died soon after arrival in the duchy. Richard was received at Bordeaux, which remained loyal, and over the following months he coerced the allegiance of several Gascon towns, including Bazas, and reinstalled English or locally-loyal garrisons in positions previously held by the French. Richard’s efforts were supported by regional magnates such as Elyas Ridell of Bergerac, whose defection from the Capetian side weakened French influence in the interior.

Louis countered by ordering Hugh de Lusignan to reinforce the French position at La Réole, leading to skirmishes along the Dordogne. Richard and William intercepted and ambushed Hugh’s column and prevented its crossing of the river, containing the Capetian advance. Meanwhile, the English Treasury, having secured taxation through the great council in 1225, began sending substantial sums of money and additional troops to Gascony. With the balance of resources shifting, the French garrison at La Réole negotiated terms and surrendered to Richard on 13 November 1225. The campaign successfully restored English control over Gascony, though no attempt was made to press northward into Poitou, where Capetian authority remained secure.

The effort was helped by the death of Louis VIII in November 1226 and the accession of the minor Louis IX under the regency of Blanche of Castile, which reduced the immediate French threat. Gascony would remain a Plantagenet possession until the end of the Hundred Years’ War in the 15th century.

=== 1230 campaign of Henry III ===
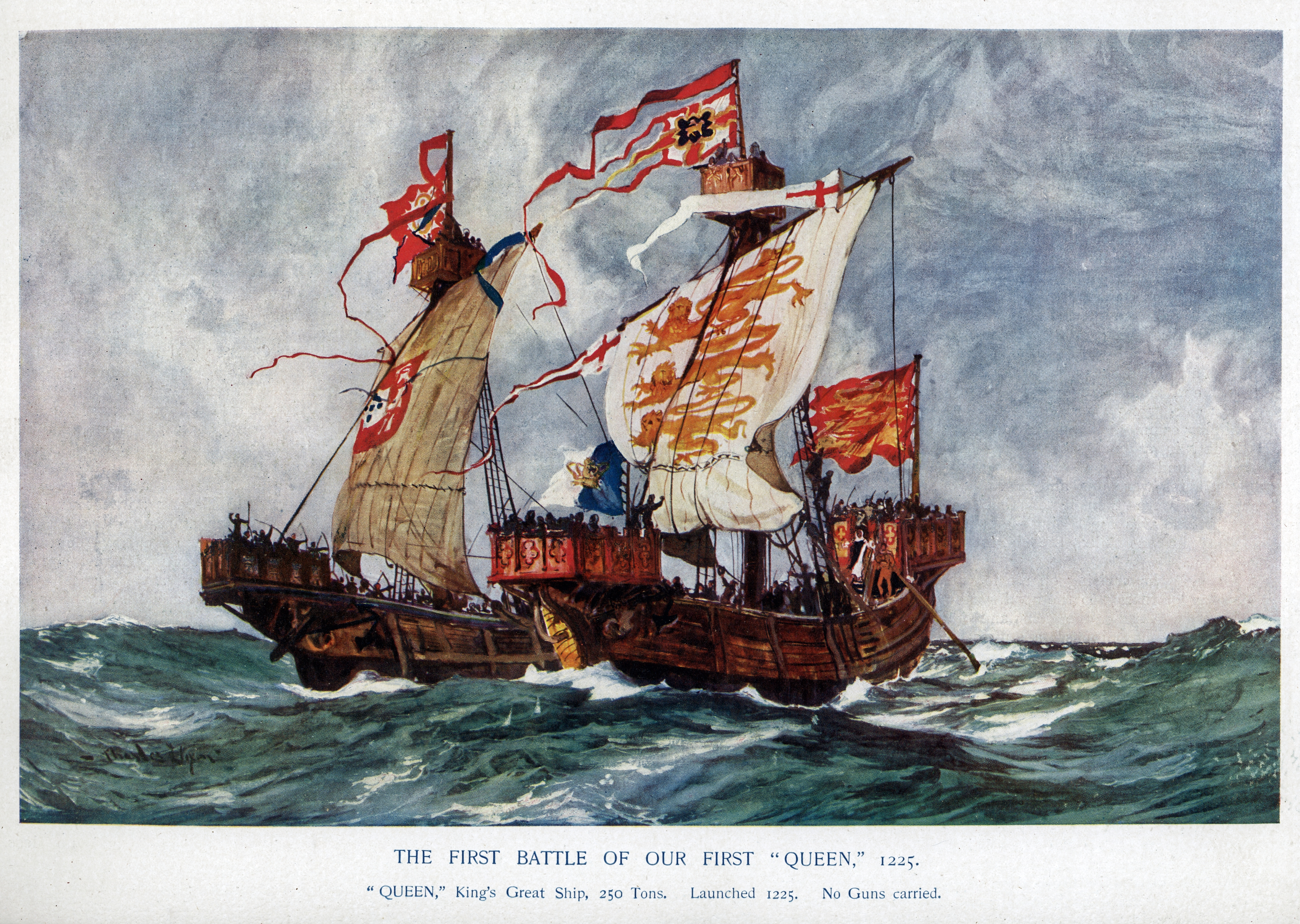
A depiction of Queen, the great ship of Henry III, which was launched in 1225 and used during the 1230 English invasion of France.

By the end of the minority of Henry III in 1226 in addition to the resolution of residual conflict from the First Barons' War, the king would prioritise the reconquest of what he described as his 'inheritance' and 'legal claims' over the former Angevin territories now occupied by the Capetians to the territories in diplomatic correspondence. After the untimely death of Louis VIII of France, much of the French nobility within former Angevin lands who still held strong ties with the Plantagenets rebelled against the new king Louis IX. It is within this context that in 1228, a group of the rebels called upon Henry to reclaim his sought-after territories. Among these rebels was the Duke of Brittany, Peter de Dreux.

By 1230, after a long period of preparation for the invasion, Henry embarked with an army from Portsmouth and eventually landed in Brittany. Upon arrival, Henry secured the homage of Peter of Brittany, de facto placing the Duchy back within the Angevin domain and providing an outpost in Northern France yet again. The French army shadowed much of the English army's movements in an attempt to repel them, however the English were able to campaign as far south as Bordeaux, capturing a few castles, notably taking the castle of Mirebeau, and receiving homage from many lords on the way. However, the campaign was mostly ineffectual and Henry was forced to re-embark for his kingdom by the end of the campaign season, landing at Portsmouth on 27 October 1230, leaving a small force under Peter of Brittany and Ranulf de Blondeville, Earl of Chester, to act against the French in Normandy and Brittany. A 4 year truce was agreed upon.

=== Loss of Brittany ===
In 1232, a civil war broke out in England between Peter des Roches, leading the English government and backed by the Poitevin faction, and the rebels led by Richard Marshal, who argued that Henry III had failed to protect the legal rights of the nobility under des Roches' administration. Henry struggled to gain a clear military advantage and became concerned that Louis of France might seize the opportunity to invade Brittany—as their truce was set to expire in 1234—while Henry was preoccupied with the conflict at home. By the time the truce with France ended, Henry agreed to make peace in the civil war. Despite this, Duke Peter of Brittany soon faced French military pressure. Henry could only send a small force to assist his vassal, and Brittany fell to the French in November. With this defeat, the Plantagenets lost their remaining control over northern France. After the dismissal of des Roches, Henry personally ruled the kingdom for the next 24 years, rather than relying on senior ministers.

=== Saintonge War ===
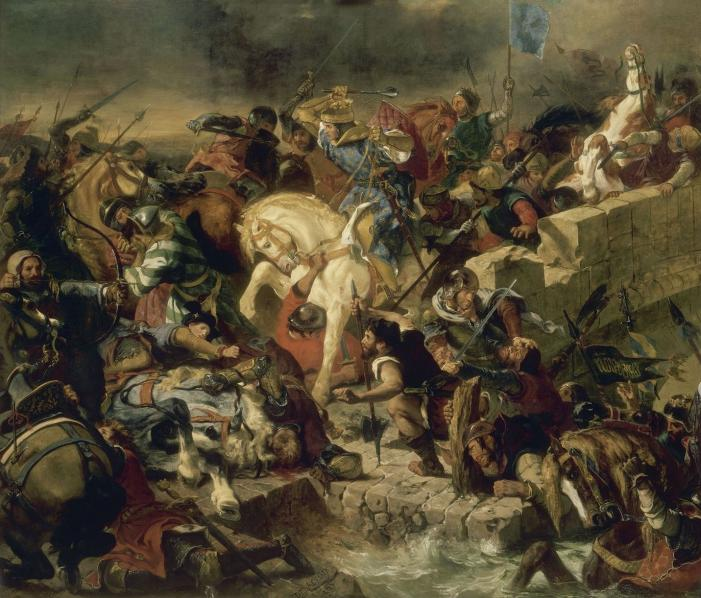
King Louis IX the Saint (depicted on a white horse) in the first phase of the Battle of Taillebourg on 21 July 1242. (Eugène Delacroix, 1837)

In 1241, another dispute arose out of France as a result of the appointment of king Louis' cousin, Alphonse, as the Count of Poitiers, a title still nominally held in contention by Richard of Cornwall. Hugh X Lusignan 'le Brun', Seigneur de Luisignan and Count of La Marche, fearing further encroachment of the Capetians within the heart of France formed a coalition of nobles to resist the appointment of the king's cousin. By the early months of 1242, Capetian forces had seized many castles held by the rebellious coalition. Henry III took advantage of the situation and set out from England with his brother Richard to intervene in the conflict and support Hugh who, at this time, was his step-father by virtue of his marriage to Henry's mother Isabella of Angoulême.

Henry, having then conquered much of southern Poitou, then moved south to meet up with Hugh's forces and do battle with the French army stationed in the region headed by Louis of France. The two forces set up camp on opposing sides of the Charente river near Taillebourg. On 21 July a wing of the English army advanced over the bridge leading to the Battle of Taillebourg. In response, the French successfully countered the maneuver with a charge of knights, thus exposing the flank of the rest of the English army. The English fought a successful rearguard action led by Simon De Montfort allowing the army to withdraw south to the nearby city of Saintes, where on 22 July the more decisive Battle of Saintes was fought. Louis pressed his advantage and laid siege to Saintes. Though it is unclear that any armed conflict happened in the siege, eventual Capetian occupation of the city brought an end to the English intervention in the Saintonge war. After the English defeat, the war continued into 1243 between Louis and count Raymond VII of Toulouse who sided with the rebel coalition. Richard conceded Poitou around December 1243.

=== Residual Conflict and European Strategy ===
By this point, France's economic and military superiority was clear. Henry was increasingly limited in his ability to reassert his claims in France. As a result, Henry adopted what historian Michael Clanchy has described as a “European strategy,” by which he sought to counter France’s superiority through elaborate continental schemes, including alliances with Capetian rivals and attempts to secure thrones abroad for members of the Plantagenet house. Henry wrote frequently to Frederick II of the Holy Roman Empire plotting to attain an alliance with him and potentially renew a joint expedition into France. After Frederick's death in 1250, Henry influenced the election for the appointment of a new King of the Romans by bribing German electors. In 1256, Henry successfully managed to get his brother Richard the title, though in reality, the title was still mostly nominal. Henry also became increasingly involved in a joint scheme with Pope Innocent IV to secure the Sicilian throne for his son Edmund. The historian Björn Weiler argues that the so-called Sicilian Business was partially '... driven by competition with, and fear of, the Capetians.' Situating another Plantagenet on a foreign throne would have brought great prestige to the royal house of England.

Modern historians characterise this period in Gascony by sieges of castles, frontier raids, and the wavering allegiances of Gascon barons divided between the Plantagenet and Capetian kings. The English seneschals focused on fortifying Bordeaux, Bayonne, and the Gironde castles, while Capetian baillis extended their influence in the Agenais and Quercy. This produced intermittent chevauchées and skirmishes across the borderlands, particularly when the Gascon nobility appealed alternately to Henry as duke of Aquitaine or to the French crown as overlord to settle their disputes.

When Louis IX departed on crusade in 1248, Henry probed for advantage. His officials launched raids into Saintonge, and local feuds in the Agenais escalated into sieges of small castles around 1249–1250. These disturbances led to petitions reaching Louis IX while he was still abroad. Tensions peaked again in the early 1250s when Simon de Montfort’s harsh governance as seneschal provoked Gascon towns and nobles into revolt. Several leading magnates, such as Gaston de Béarn and the count of Foix, openly courted French support.

To restore order, Henry personally led an expedition to Gascony in 1253 and 1254, accompanied by Queen Eleanor and Prince Edward. Chroniclers present the king’s presence as both military and ceremonial: garrisons were reinforced, rebels coerced, and political oaths renewed. Henry left Edward invested as duke of Aquitaine and arranged his marriage to Eleanor of Castile, securing a Castilian alliance. The later 1250s still saw minor sieges and disputes in Blaye, Bourg, and Bazas, as English and French officials supported rival claimants in the Agenais and Quercy.

=== Treaty of Paris ===
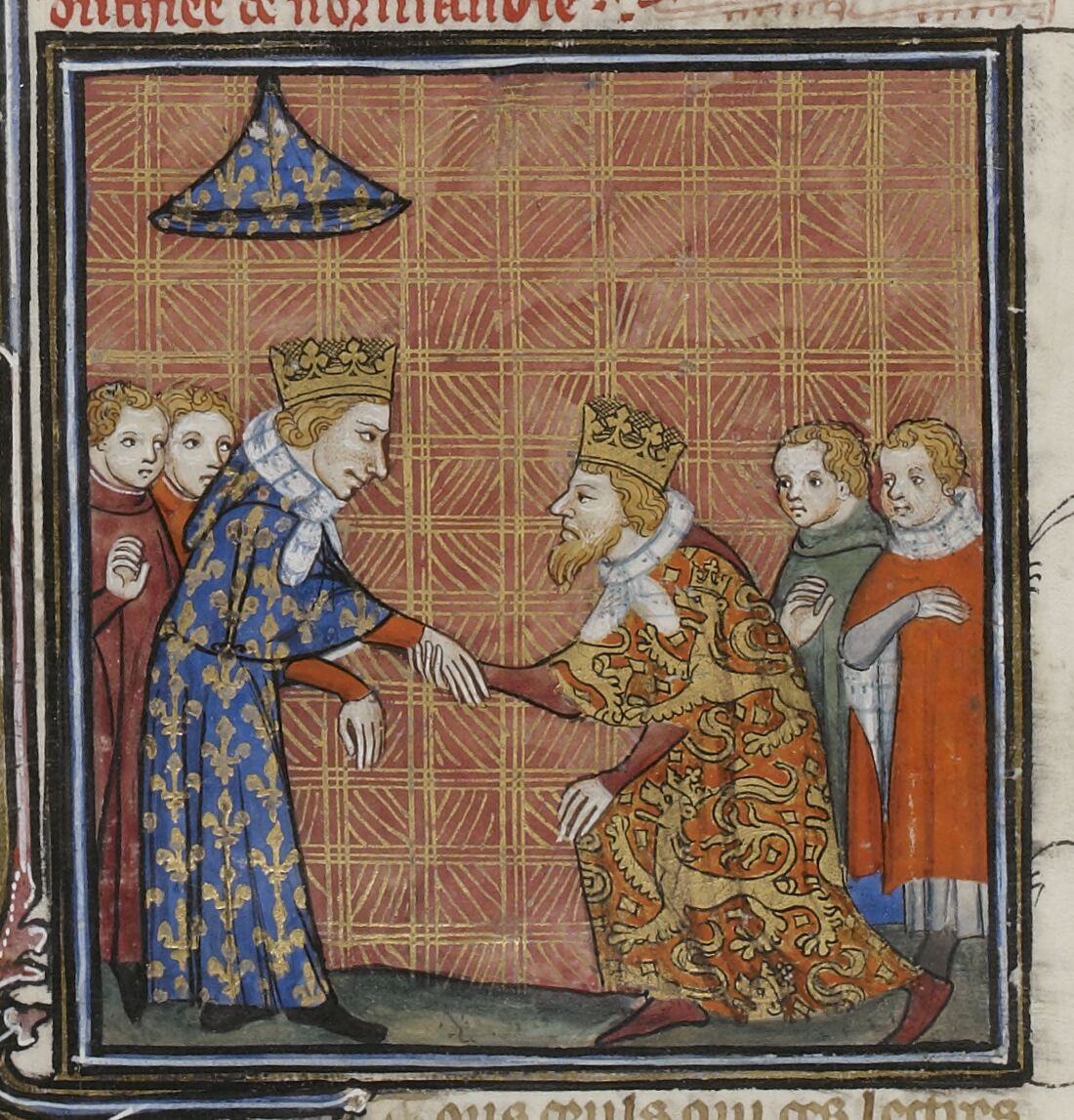
Henry III paying homage to Louis IX of France.

The stage was set for another two-pronged invasion of France as of Henry's German allies were in favor of a war; however, the Pope, intending to focus Henry's attention on Sicily, pressured him to make a permanent peace with France instead. Tensions were also escalating within the English realm as Henry's endeavors in Sicily were evidently becoming a costly fiasco. The prospect of a Second Barons' War loomed as the English barons sought to reassert the authority of Magna Carta, which the king had been overstepping for decades. By 1257–1258, negotiations between the courts of Paris and Westminster produced the framework for a lasting settlement. Seeking to restore his position in a seemingly desperate situation, Henry concluded the Treaty of Paris in 1259, by which he renounced claims to Normandy, Anjou, Maine, Touraine, and Poitou in return for recognition of his lordship in Gascony and its associated territories, for which he was now bound to perform homage to the French crown. The treaty effectively purchased Louis’s goodwill, which in turn translated into his support for Henry during the revolt of his barons.

The Treaty of Paris put an end to Henry's and any future king of England's ambitions to reestablish the former Angevin Empire which defined the previous hundred years of conflict and rivalry. For the remainder of Henry's reign, the two kingdoms enjoyed a period of peace and stable relations. Initially for Henry, this was out of necessity in order to gain support against his rebellious barons. However, after meeting in person for the first time in 1254, the two kings became close friends, finding that they shared similar views on religion. Despite this friendship, Henry still frequently reminded Louis of his territorial claims until the treaty was finalised. The kings were on such amicable terms towards the end of the conflict that Louis gifted Henry an elephant from the Seventh Crusade.

== Further disputes: 1293–1325 ==
=== Gascon War ===
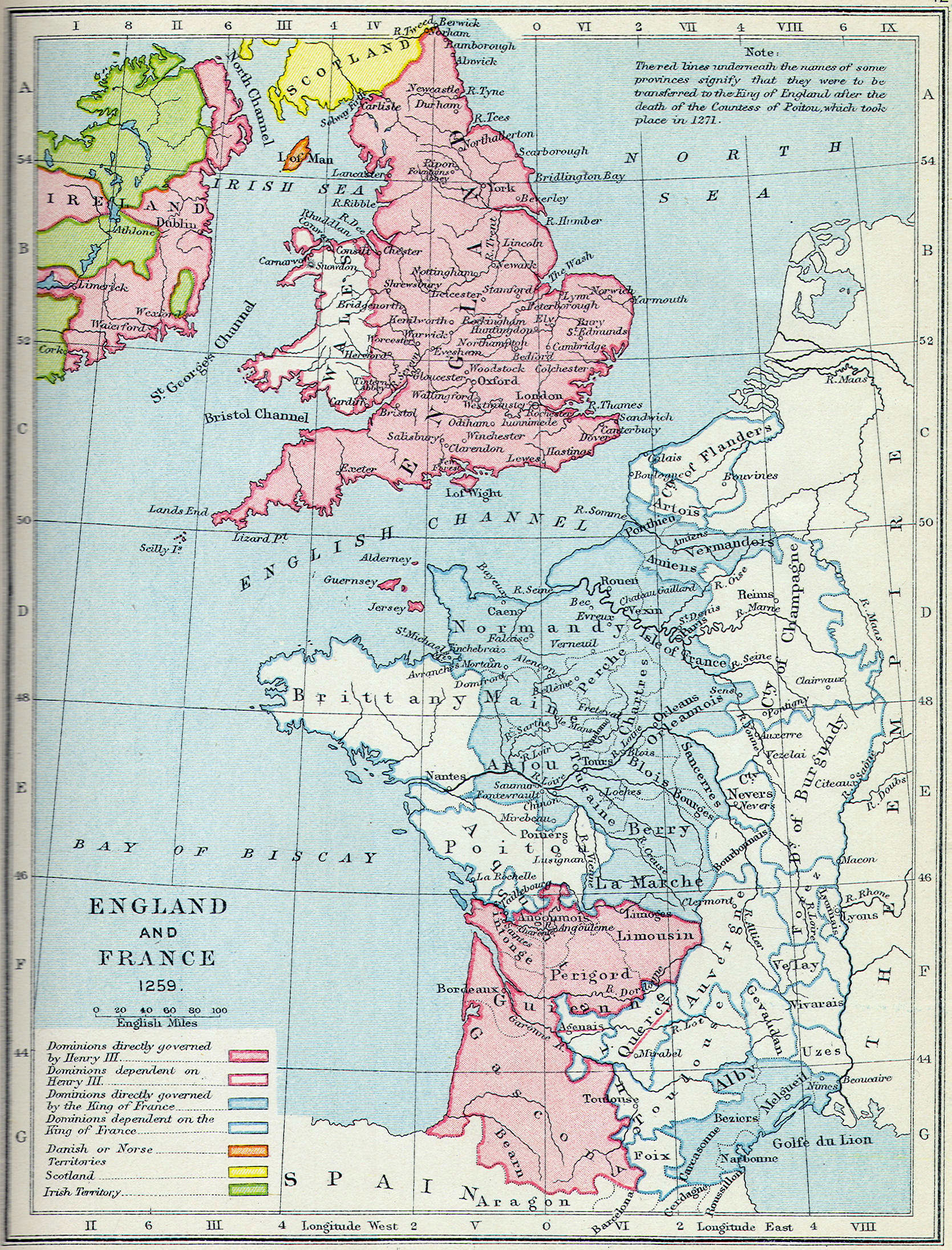
The English Angevin Empire and France after the 1259 Treaty of Paris and the 1271 deaths of the Count and Countess of Poitou.

In 1272, Henry was succeeded by his son, Edward, who continued to keep peaceable relations with the kings of France during the beginning of his reign. In 1286, Edward visited France to pay homage to the new king Philip IV 'the Fair' of France. However, by 1293, an informal war had broken out between English, Gascon, Norman, and French sailors which resulted in the sacking of La Rochelle which was a part of the Capetian royal demesne. Despite Edmund Crouchback's best efforts to keep the peace and, on behalf of his brother Edward, show no intention of war by giving up Gascony's chief fortress, the French Parlement declared Gascony forfeit when Edward refused to appear before him in Paris. In response, Edward renounced his vassalage to the French king and prepared for war. The main English army, under Henry de Lacy, was ambushed and defeated at the Battle of Bonnegarde in 2 February 1297 by Robert II d'Artois. Little could now be done about the French occupation of Gascony, however, Edward allied himself with Guy, Count of Flanders; Henry III, Count of Bar; John I, count of Holland; and Adolf, king of the Germans, and landed an army in northern France in late August 1297 to support his Flemish allies. However, the French had already beaten back the Flemish at the Battle of Furnes, forcing Edward to move south and support Henry's raids into France instead. In 1299, the Treaties of Montreuil and Chartres, along with Edward's marriage to Philip's half-sister, Margaret, produced a prolonged armistice. Eventually in 1303, a peace treaty was signed that handed Gascony back to Edward and renewed the feudal contract.

=== War of Saint-Sardos ===
In 1307, Edward was succeeded by his son Edward II. On 25 January 1308, he married Isabella, daughter of Philip of France, to further resolve the tension between the two crowns. It is, however, during Edward's reign that the territorial extent of the Duchy of Aquitaine slowly dwindled due to a series of legal proceedings in an effort by the French crown and Parlement to take the last remaining Plantagenet foothold in the kingdom without any bloodshed. It is due to one of these legal proceedings that the town of Saint-Sardos switched hands in 15 October 1323. The following day, a local lord named Raymond-Bernard of Montpezat was upset by the decision and raided Saint-Sardos, razing it to the ground. The French government then accused Ralph Basset, the Seneschal of Gascony, of perpetrating the crime by association. Despite Edward's best efforts to diplomatically resolve the crisis caused by his vassal over the course of almost a year, a French army led by Charles of Valois invaded Gascony with very little resistance in August 1324. This humiliation was partially what led to Edward's downfall back in England. On 31 March 1325, Gascony was handed back to the Plantagenets after a truce.

Ironically, Edward III, the son of Isabella and Edward II, would later use his position as grandson of Philip the Fair to claim the Kingdom of France. Therefore, the marriage settlements that sealed the end of the First Hundred Years' War would lead to the casus belli that was employed to declare the 'second' Hundred Years' War.

== See also ==
- Angevin Empire
- Hundred Years' War
