= Battle of Soindres =

1188 battle between the Kingdoms of France and England near Soindres

- Part of First Hundred Years' War
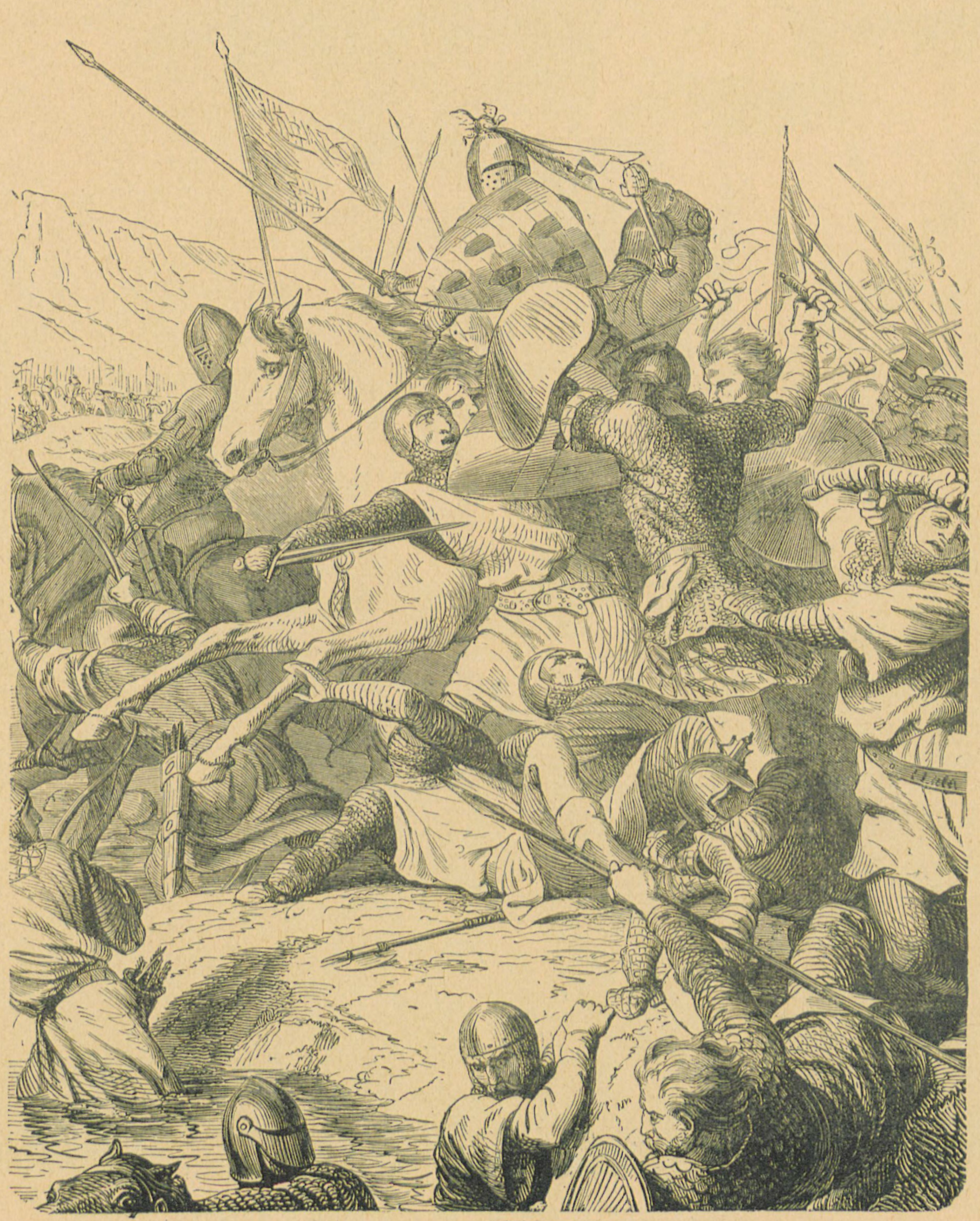
- Guillaume II des Barres in the battle of Mantes (c. 1860s French engraving)
Date	17 August 1188
Location	fields between Soindres village and Mantes-la-Jolie, north-western France
Result	French victory

Belligerents
Kingdom of France	Kingdom of England

Commanders and leaders
Philip II of France; Thierry, Count of Flanders	Henry II of England

Strength
c. 5,000 men	Unknown

Casualties and losses
Unknown	Unknown

The Battle of Soindres or the Battle of Mantes was a military engagement between Kingdom of France and Kingdom of England that took place on August 17, 1188 near the village of Soindres, north-western France, as part of the First Hundred Years' War. French forces of king Philip II of France and communal militias of the city of Mantes were able to defeat the troops led by king Henry II of England, who were ravaging the Mantois Region with intention to siege the fortified city and castle of Mantes.

== Background ==
Capetian-Plantagenet rivalry transformed to an open military conflict in 1159. Since then, French Capetians and Plantagenets ruling England and parts of France clashed with their armies on the French soil disputing each other about their legitimacy of ruling.

In 1180, Louis VII was succeeded by his son, Philip II Augustus on the throne of France. In 1186, Philip demanded that he be given the Duchy of Brittany and insisted that Henry order his son Richard the Lionheart to withdraw from Toulouse, where he had been sent with an army to apply new pressure on Count Raymond, Philip's uncle. Philip Augustus threatened to invade Normandy if this did not happen and reopened the question of the Vexin. In 1187, Richard's renewed campaign into Toulouse undermined the truce between Henry and Philip. Both kings mobilized large forces in anticipation of war. Hostility of both monarchs was also reflected in the Cutting of the elm diplomatic incident, when Philip ordered to cut down the elm tree near Gisors in Normandy, covering the traditional place of French-English diplomatic meetings.

== Battle ==
In summer 1188 Henry II started a military campaign against Philip and invaded the area around Mantes, French fortress city about 50 kilometers north-west from Paris. English forces looted the villages of Chaufour, Boissy, Breval, Neauphlette, Mondreville, Jouy, Favrieux, Menerville, Le Mesnil, La Folie, Anet, Landelle Blaru, Lommoye or Fontenay with the plan of besieging Mantes as the strongpoint of the Phillip's power in the region.

News about the attack reached king Phillip at Chaumont-en-Vexin. The king, who was not able to assemble his loyal forces quickly enough, decided to face the enemy in the open field, near the Mantes city walls. French forces composed of some from the king's army, then Mantes city militia and knights of local nobility in a total strength of about five thousand men were outnumbered by the English and reach their enemy in the fields between Mantes and Soindres. On the French side nobles Dreux de Mellot, Girard de Fournival, Hugue de Alaincourt and maybe also Guillaume II des Barres were present. Nevertheless, French troops were able to gain the advantage by capturing a strategic point of the hill of Pongebœuf and forced Henry's armies to retreat.

== Aftermath ==
After this success Philip II almost immediately started actions to seize the independent Norman Vexin. Mantes then served as his headquarters for the future military operations, like the siege of Gaillard Castle in 1203 and 1204 or the actions of Radepont.

The event is commemorated by naming one of the streets in Mantes-la-Jolie Rue de Belles Lances.

== See also ==
- First Hundred Years' War
- Cutting of the elm
- Philip II of France
- Henry II of England

== Bibliography ==
- Roger of Hoveden (1868–1871). Stubbs, William (ed.). Chronica Magistri Rogeri de Houedene (in Latin). London.
