= Battle of Fréteval =

1194 Anglo-Norman victory over France

The Battle of Fréteval, which took place on 3 July 1194, was a medieval battle, part of the ongoing fighting between Richard the Lionheart and Philip II of France that lasted from 1193 to Richard's death in April 1199. During the battle, the Anglo-Norman and Angevin forces ambushed the French army, which was defeated. Philip managed to flee but lost his archives which were captured by Richard. After the battle, Philip decided to keep them in Paris, which led to the creation of the French national library, the Archives Nationales.

== Background ==
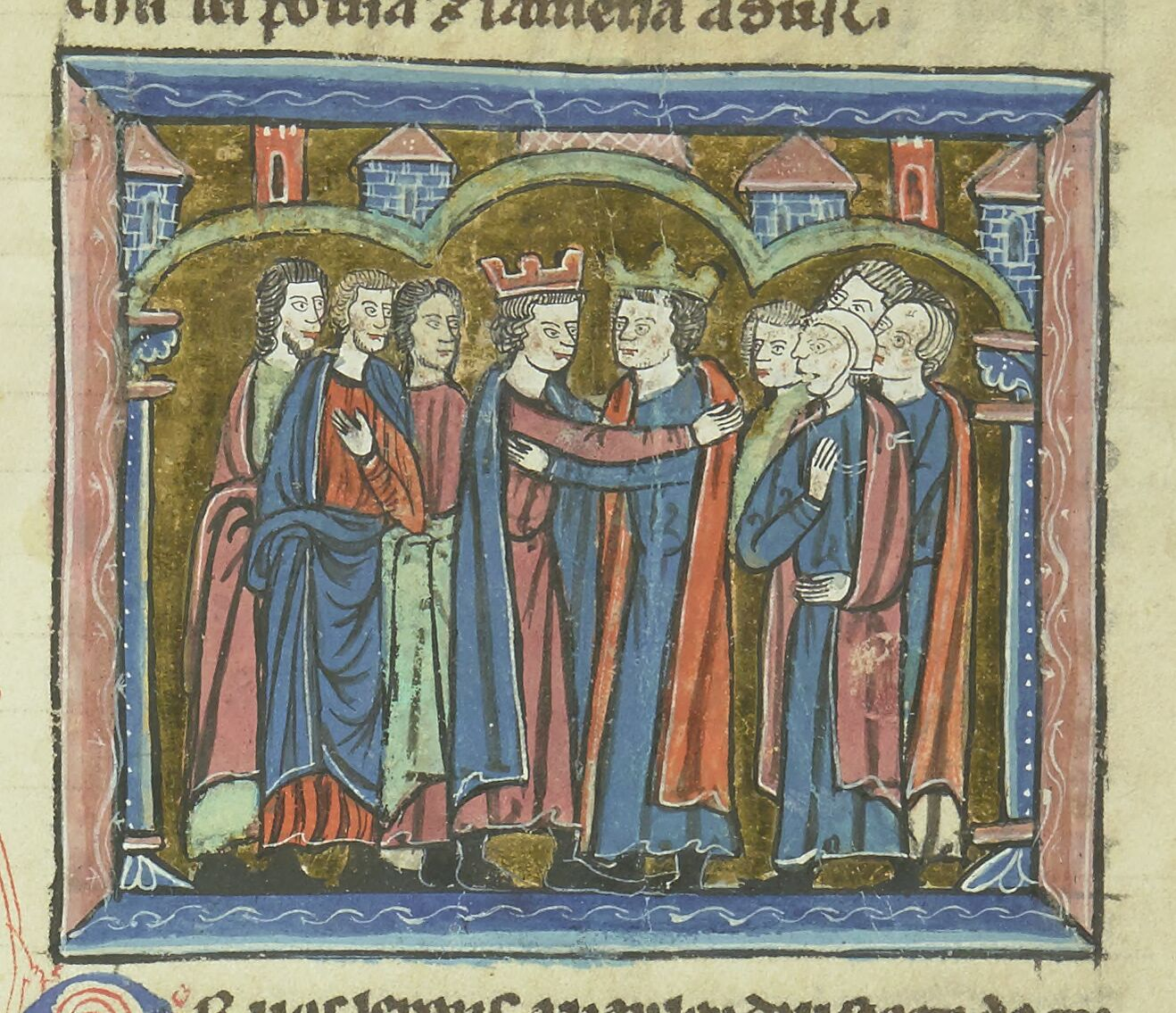
Richard Lionheart and Philip Augustus

=== Richard I ===
King Richard I of England had been captured and imprisoned by Leopold of Austria on the King's return from crusade in December 1192. For over a year, the terms of his release were negotiated, until he was released on payment of a massive ransom in January 1194. Whilst he was imprisoned, Richard's brother, John, had allied against Richard with the French King, Philip II, who had also wanted to capture the English king. John had granted Philip much land from Richard's estates in Aquitaine. As well as various castles, this included the whole of the duchy lands east of the River Seine.

=== Phillip II ===
During Richard's imprisonment, Philip had made attempts at physically occupying these estates, with some success, particularly around the important Channel ports of Dieppe (shortest distance between Paris and the English channel) and Le Tréport. However, as soon as Richard returned to Normandy, John made his peace with him, abandoning Philip; Richard proceeded to unravel much of Philip's recent gains in the region, beginning with the raising of Philip's siege of Verneuil on 29 May 1194. There, Philip was forced into a hasty retreat, and, foreshadowing his losses at Fréteval, abandoned his siege engines and other valuable matériel.

== Encounter at Fréteval Wood ==
King Philip probably shadowed Richard's army, as the latter moved through the Loire Valley, in an attempt at constraining the English army's ability to manoeuvre. However near Fréteval—a small village located on the right bank of the River Loir—Richard doubled-back on the French, in which pursuit the English king's horse was killed. It remains uncertain whether, despite the fact that contemporaries described the encounter as a battle, the two forces ever made contact. It is possible that the rear portion of the French force engaged with that of the English. However, as part of a war in which skirmishing was the usual form of encounter, Fréteval was no different, and, it has been said, it "does not deserve the label of a battle". In what was most likely an ambush by the English, Philip appears to have abandoned his baggage train in a wood as Richard approached, and escaped to a Saint-Hilaire chapel on Whitsun Eve. Philip's 'sudden departure', wrote historian John Gillingham, was "the last straw for his troops, already demoralized by the threat to their supplies". Richard proceeded to harry the retreating French soldiers, before entering Verneuil in triumph. The engagement at Fréteval has been described as "a minor disaster" for the Philip, although probably more in political terms than military.

=== Phillip's escape ===
One of the reasons kings of the period were so often averse to pitched battles was that they travelled as an itinerant government and nomadic treasury, which were too valuable to lose on the battlefield. And since kings of this period often travelled as peripatetic courts, Philip's baggage train contained not just personal effects, such as household furniture but the necessary paraphernalia for government and tax collecting. Among the French king's luggage, captured by the English, were his personal seal, and important archival documents such as financial records, domanial charters, payment inventories, and rent and toll receipts. Also captured was a great quantity of treasure, "whose value was immense", said one French chronicler. Philip beat a hasty retreat across the River Epte, and in doing so, the bridge collapsed under the weight of the retreating army. This apparently resulted in the French king getting soaked through, which one writer has described as 'a condition which delighted Richard. The English King may have come "within minutes" of capturing Philip, but, being overly-enthusiastic in his attempt to capture Philip, rode a great distance past the chapel where Philip was actually hiding, allowing him to escape.

== Aftermath ==
=== Founding of the Archives Nationale ===
The archives, it has been claimed, gave Richard the names and details of all of Philip's spies and agents in the duchy of Aquitane, as well as Angevin deserters to the French. And at least one contemporary chronicler, it has been said, "dwelt lovingly" on the French king's humiliation, whilst, possibly in retaliation, Philip sacked the town of Évreux, which was a possession of Philip's erstwhile ally, John, as well as local churches. French chroniclers however, and perhaps less surprisingly, tended to gloss over Philip's rout at Fréteval; one covered it in a single sentence. This was not unusual; small skirmishes like Fréteval were often recorded by chroniclers whose side won and ignored by those who lost.

Richard, although he was never to return to England, dispatched the captured French archives to London, where they were deposited in the Tower. As a result of this battle, Philip became the first French king not to take his archives on campaign with him, as had been customary, but to create the Trésor des Chartes in Paris for permanent deposit in a newly created new Chancery. This has been described as "a first step in maintaining the documentary record of monarchial government".

=== Later events ===
At the Battle of Gisors (sometimes called Courcelles) in 1198, Richard took Dieu et mon Droit—"God and my Right"—as his motto (still used by the British monarchy today), echoing his earlier boast to Emperor Henry that his rank acknowledged no superior but God. In January 1199, Philip and Richard agreed on a five-year truce that held. Two months later Richard was in Limousin suppressing a revolt, during which he besieged Châlus Castle. On 26 March he was hit in the shoulder by a crossbow bolt, and the wound turned gangrenous; he died on 6 April 1199. In May 1200, Philip signed the Treaty of Le Goulet with Richard's successor, his brother John. This peace did not last, as dissatisfaction with John as a liege lord led to a new revolt in Aquitaine which Philip supported.
