= Anglo-French Wars =

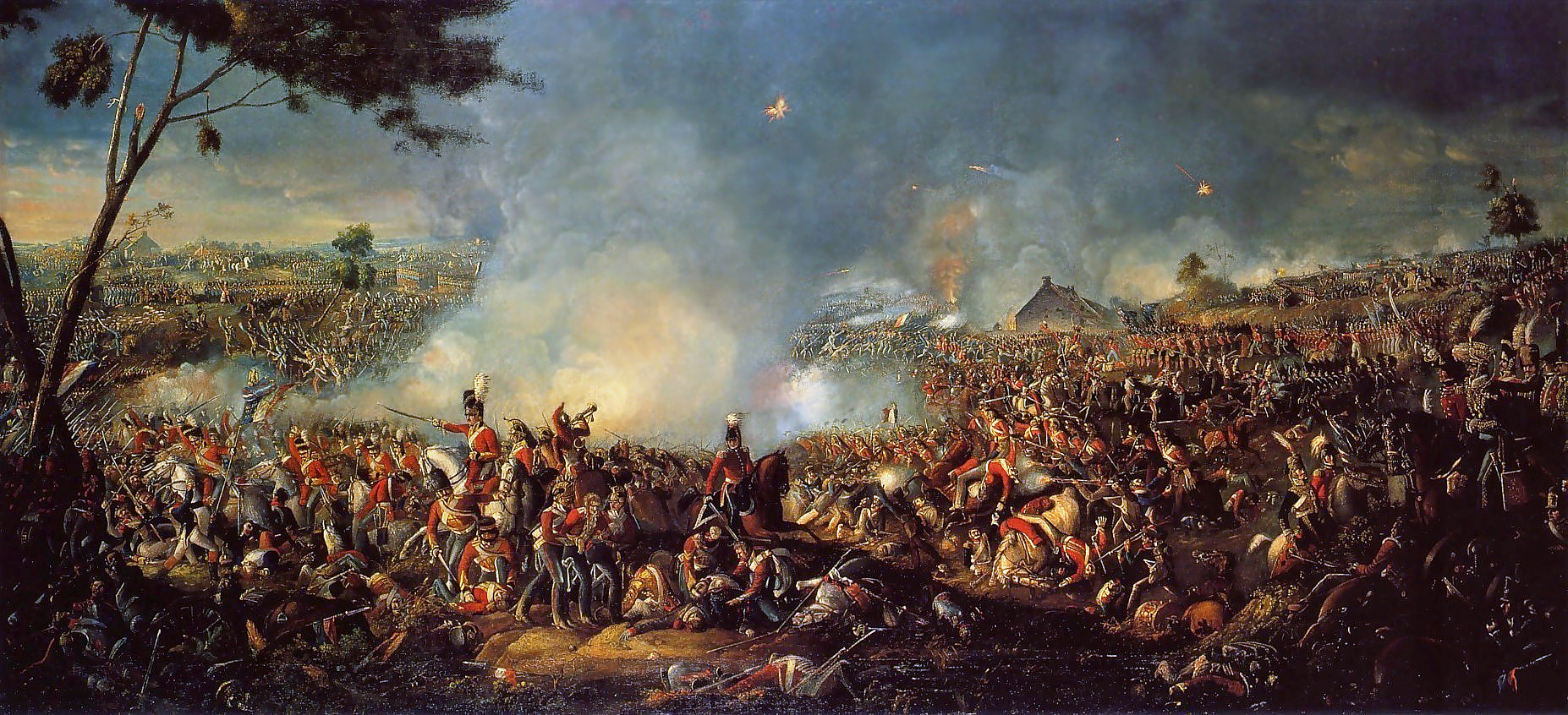
Battle of Waterloo, 1815

There have been many Anglo-French wars in history.

== Middle Ages ==
=== High Middle Ages ===
- Norman Conquest (1066) – invasion of the Anglo-Saxon Kingdom of England by the French vassal state of Normandy
- Anglo-French War (1109–1113) – first conflict between the Capetian dynasty and the House of Normandy post-Norman conquest
- Anglo-French War (1116–1119) – conflict over English possession of Normandy
- Anglo-French War (1123–1135) – conflict that amalgamated into The Anarchy
- First Hundred Years' War (1159–1259)
  - Anglo-French War (1158–1189) – first conflict between the Capetian dynasty and the House of Plantagenet
  - Anglo-French War (1193–1199) – conflict between King Richard the Lionheart and King Philip Augustus
  - Invasion of Normandy by Philip II of France (1202–1204) – French invasion of Normandy
  - Anglo-French War (1213–1214) – conflict between King Philip Augustus and King John of England
  - Anglo-French War (1215–1217) – the French intervention in the First Barons War
  - Siege of La Rochelle (1224) – known as the Poitou War
  - English reclamation of Gascony (1225–1226)
  - English invasion of France (1230) – a military campaign undertaken by Henry III of England
  - English loss of Brittany (1234)
  - Saintonge War (1242–1243)

=== Late Middle Ages ===
- Gascon War (1294–1303) – known as Guyenne War in French
- War of Saint-Sardos (1324)
- the Hundred Years' War (1337–1453) – and its peripheral conflicts, often broken up into:
  - Edwardian War (1337–1360)
  - War of the Breton Succession (1341–1365)
  - Caroline War (1369–1389)
  - Lancastrian War (1415–1453)
- Anglo-French War (1351–1367) – English and French support for the opposing parties in the Castilian Civil War of 1351–1369
- Anglo French War (1383–1385) – English and French support for the opposing parties in the 1383–1385 Portuguese interregnum
- Anglo-French War (1404–1408) – French support for the Glyndŵr rebellion
- Anglo-French War (1487–1491) – part of the French-Breton War
- Anglo-French War (1496–1498) – part of the Italian War of 1494–1498

== Modern period ==
=== Early modern period ===
- Anglo-French War (1512–1514) – part of the War of the League of Cambrai
- Anglo-French War (1522–1526) – part of the Italian War of 1521–1526
- Anglo-French War (1542–1546) – part of the Italian War of 1542–1546
- Anglo-French War (1547–1551) – part of the Rough Wooing
- Anglo-French War (1557–1559) – part of the Italian War of 1551–1559
- English expedition to France (1562–1563) – English intervention in the first of the French Wars of Religion
- Anglo-French War (1613) – English raiding campaign against Acadia
- Anglo-French War (1627–1629) – the English intervention during the Huguenot rebellions
- English invasion of Acadia – an English incursion into the French colony of Acadia spurred on in part from an aborted attempt to invade New Netherland as a consequence of the First Anglo-Dutch War.
- Anglo-French War (1666–1667) – minor corollary of the Second Anglo-Dutch War
- Anglo-French War (1678) – part of the Franco-Dutch War and its peripheral conflicts

=== Second Hundred Years' War ===
- Anglo-French War (1689–1697) – part of the Nine Years' War and its peripheral conflicts
- Anglo-French War (1702–1713) – part of the War of the Spanish Succession and its peripheral conflicts
- Anglo-French War (1721–1763) – part of the Chickasaw Wars
- Anglo-French War (1744–1748) – part of the War of the Austrian Succession and its peripheral conflicts
- Anglo-French War (1746–1763) – part of the Carnatic Wars
- Father Le Loutre's War (1749–1755)
- Anglo-French War (1756–1763) – part of the Seven Years' War and its peripheral conflicts
- Anglo-French War (1778–1783) – part of the American Revolutionary War and its peripheral conflicts
- Anglo-French war (1790–1792) – part of the Third Anglo-Mysore War
- Anglo-French War (1793–1802) – part of the French Revolutionary Wars and their peripheral conflicts
- Anglo-French War (1803–1815) – part of the Napoleonic Wars

=== Late modern period ===
- World War II (1940–44); Britain fought alongside Free France against Vichy France, without a declaration of war
  - Battle of Dakar (1940)
  - Syria–Lebanon campaign (1941)
  - Battle of Madagascar (1942)
  - Operation Torch (1942)
  - Liberation of France (1944)

== Bibliography and external links ==
- Kohn, George C (2006). Dictionary of Wars. Infobase Publishing. ISBN 9781438129167.
- Lee, Roger. "Anglo-French Wars". The History Guy.
