= Battle of Gisors =

Battle in 1198 in France

Coordinates: 49°15′42″N 1°44′37″E

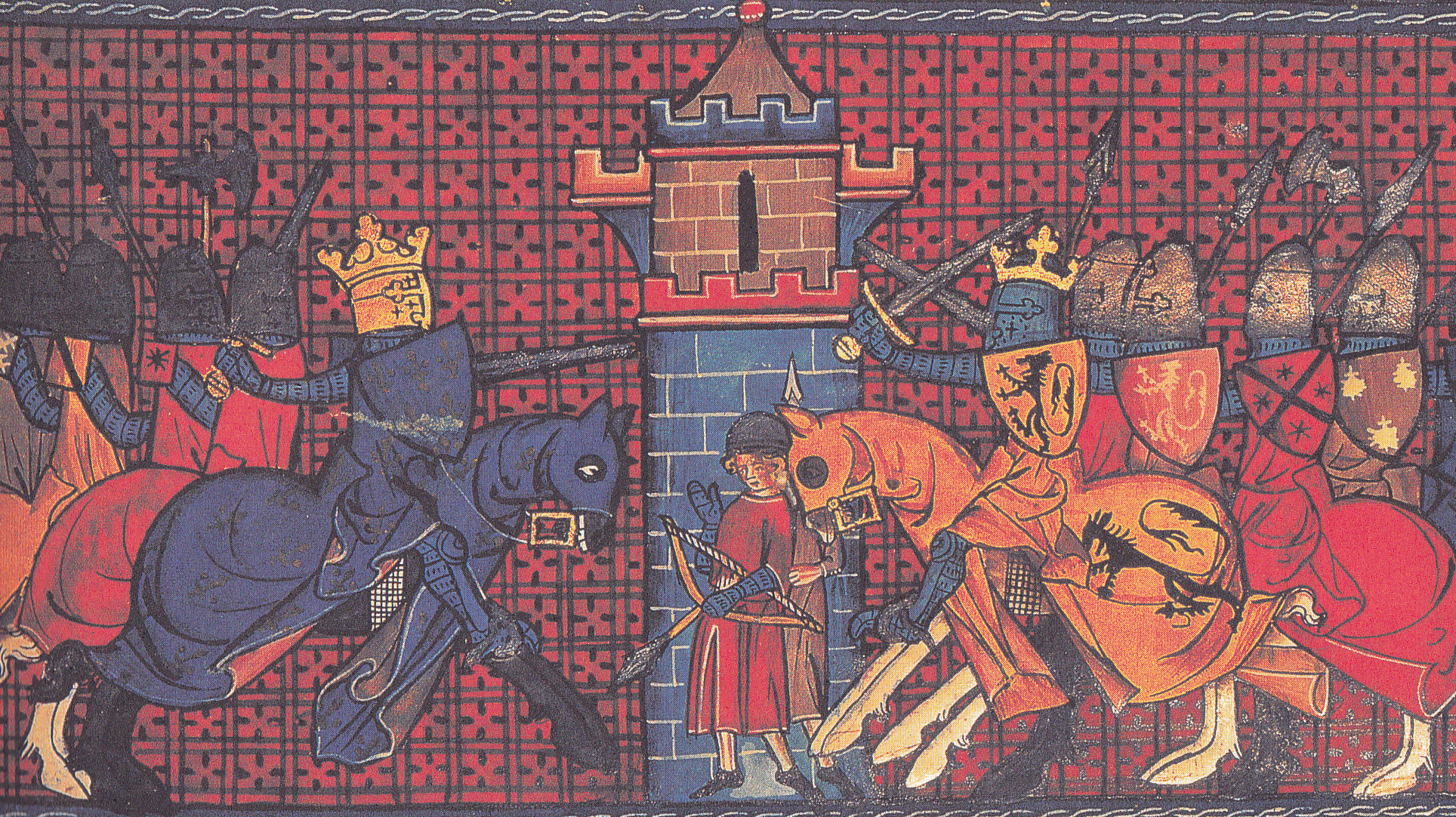
Date	27 September 1198
Location	Courcelles-lès-Gisors, Oise, Picardy, France
Result	English victory

Belligerents
Kingdom of England; Duchy of Normandy	Kingdom of France

Commanders and leaders
Richard the Lionheart	Philip Augustus

Strength
200 and/or more knights; unknown amount of infantry-presumably more than knights	300 and/or more knights; unknown amount of infantry-presumably more than knights

Casualties and losses
Unknown number of casualties	At least 100 knights captured

The Battle of Gisors (27 September 1198) was a skirmish fought in Courcelles-lès-Gisors, Oise, Picardy, part of the ongoing fighting between Richard I of England and Philip Augustus of France that lasted from 1194 to Richard's death in April 1199. The earlier conflict restarted after the truce between the two kings expired (just long enough to see the harvest in, according to the chronicler Roger of Hoveden). Both kings invaded and pillaged the other's territory, causing great suffering to the local population by having their captives' eyes put out.

Richard advanced through French territory by capturing several castles, most notably, the castle of Courcelles (of which the imposing unique oval donjon remains) and the stronghold at Burris. The French king tried to recapture Courcelles as he marched from Mante with 300 knights and a gathering of footsoldiers and citizens. The two forces met, after the Frankish army — which was superior in numbers — changed directions and advanced towards Gisors. The Anglo-Normans defeated the French and captured many prominent knights, as well as riderless horses. The French fled the field by crossing the bridge at the town of Gisors, which broke down under their weight, "and the king of France, as we have heard say, had to drink of the river" Richard reported to the Bishop of Durham; with the French king struggling for his life, his troops managed to pull him out of the water. The impregnable fortress of Gisors remained in French hands, nevertheless.

The battle was followed by another temporary truce, made at Vernon.

Allegedly, before Gisors, Richard coined as countersign the parole of the day to tell friend from foe, "Dieu et mon droit", a denial of his fealty to the King of France. By this motto, Richard attested that he owed his kingdom—and Normandy, Aquitaine, and Anjou—to God and his right alone.
