= Treaty of Le Goulet =

1200 treaty between England and France

Coordinates: 49.093391°N 1.487363°E

The Treaty of Le Goulet was a treaty signed by Kings John of England and Philip II of France in May 1200. It ended the first succession war following Richard I's death, temporarily settling territorial disputes over Normandy and recognizing John as the rightful heir and King of England. The peace held until Philip's invasion of Normandy in 1202, which led to continental Normandy's formal annexation to the crown lands of France.

The treaty was signed at Le Goulet, an island in the middle of the Seine river near Vernon in Normandy. It clarified the feudal hierarchy between the two monarchs, with John acknowledging Philip as his overlord for his French lands. In return, Philip dropped his support for Arthur of Brittany (son of John's late brother Geoffrey) and accepted John's claim to the English throne.

As part of the deal, John paid Philip 20,000 marks as relief in exchange for formal recognition of his rule over Brittany. John also accepted that the counts of Boulogne and Flanders were vassals of the French king, not the English, and promised not to support any rebellion against them. He recognized Philip’s supremacy over the French territories that had once belonged to the Angevin Empire.

John made several territorial concessions. He gave up the Vexin (except for Les Andelys, where the important fortress of Château Gaillard stood), along with Évreux, Issoudun, Graçay, and other lands in Berry. These areas passed from English to French control. One side effect of these changes was the separation of the Channel Islands from mainland Normandy.

The Duchy of Aquitaine remained under John’s control, as it still legally belonged to his mother, Eleanor of Aquitaine. To seal the treaty, a marriage was arranged between the Angevin and Capetian dynasties: John’s niece, Blanche of Castile, and Philip’s son, the future Louis VIII. This alliance was meant to strengthen ties between the two dynasties, but it offered only a brief pause in hostilities. In 1202, Philip declared John had forfeited his French lands for failing to appear in court, and war broke out again. Philip’s forces quickly seized Normandy, strengthening the French crown and ending Plantagenet rule in the region.

== Sources ==
- Labarge, Margaret Wade. Gascony, England's First Colony 1204–1453. London: Hamish Hamilton, 1980.
