= Soindres =

- Commune
- Location of Soindres
- Location within France Location within Île-de-France (region)
- Coordinates: 48°57′28″N 1°40′34″E
- Country: France
- Region: Île-de-France
- Department: Yvelines
- Arrondissement: Mantes-la-Jolie
- Canton: Bonnières-sur-Seine
- Intercommunality: CU Grand Paris Seine et Oise

Government
  - Mayor (2020–2026): Jacky Lavigogne
- Area^{1}: 5.19 km^{2} (2.00 sq mi)
- Elevation: 115 m (377 ft)
- Highest elevation: 141 m (463 ft)
- Lowest elevation: 85 m (279 ft)
- Population (2023): 757
  - Density: 146/km^{2} (378/sq mi)
- Time zone: UTC+01:00 (CET)
  - Summer (DST): UTC+02:00 (CEST)
- INSEE/Postal code: 78597 /78200
- ^{1} French Land Register data, which excludes lakes, ponds, glaciers > 1 km^{2} (0.386 sq mi or 247 acres) and river estuaries.

Soindres (French pronunciation: [swɛ̃dʁ]) is a commune in the Yvelines department in the Île-de-France region in north-central France.

== See also ==
- Communes of the Yvelines department
