= Courcelles-lès-Gisors =

- Commune
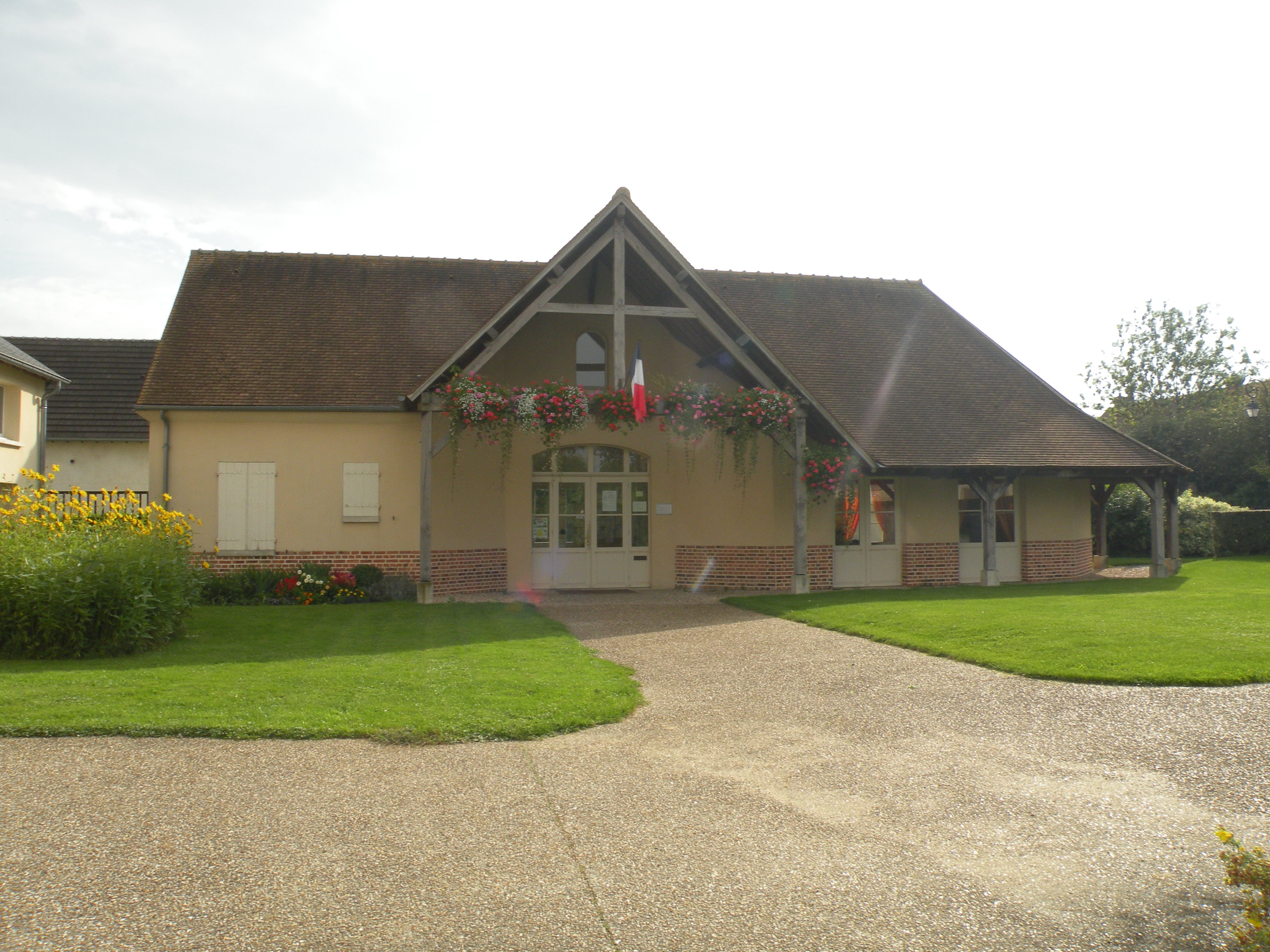
- The town hall in Courcelles-lès-Gisors

- Coat of arms
- Location of Courcelles-lès-Gisors
- Location within France Location within Hauts-de-France
- Coordinates: 49°15′42″N 1°44′37″E
- Country: France
- Region: Hauts-de-France
- Department: Oise
- Arrondissement: Beauvais
- Canton: Chaumont-en-Vexin
- Intercommunality: Vexin Thelle

Government
  - Mayor (2020–2026): Alain Frigiotti
- Area^{1}: 6.92 km^{2} (2.67 sq mi)
- Elevation: 142 m (466 ft)
- Highest elevation: 141 m (463 ft)
- Lowest elevation: 41 m (135 ft)
- Population (2023): 809
  - Density: 117/km^{2} (303/sq mi)
- Time zone: UTC+01:00 (CET)
  - Summer (DST): UTC+02:00 (CEST)
- INSEE/Postal code: 60169 /60240
- ^{1} French Land Register data, which excludes lakes, ponds, glaciers > 1 km^{2} (0.386 sq mi or 247 acres) and river estuaries.

Courcelles-lès-Gisors (French pronunciation: [kuʁsɛl lɛ ʒizɔʁ], literally Courcelles near Gisors) is a commune in the Oise department in northern France.

== See also ==
- Communes of the Oise department
