= Cutting of the elm =

1188 Anglo-French diplomatic incident

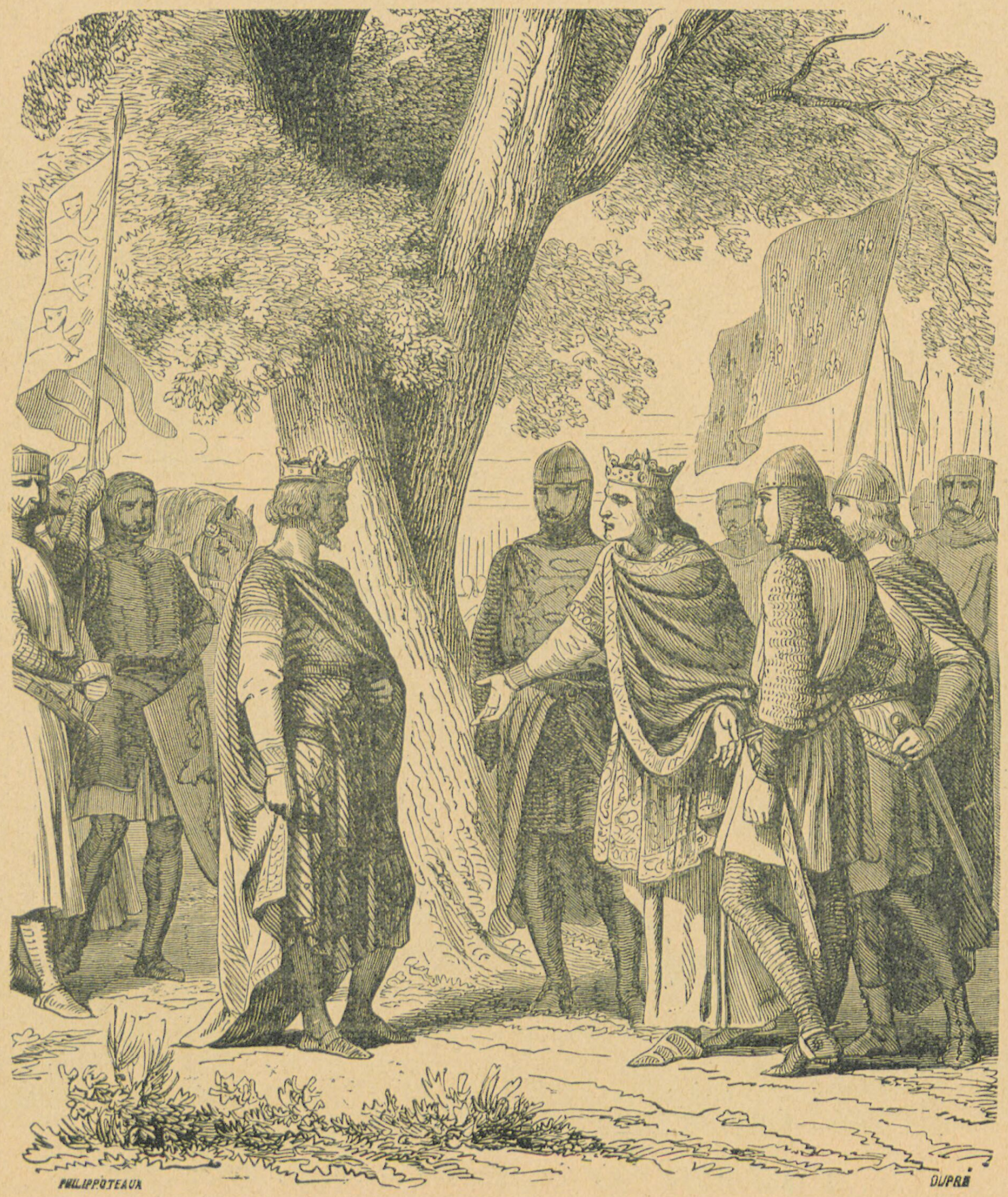
Illustration of the kings meeting by French artist H. F. E. Philippoteaux (c. 1860)

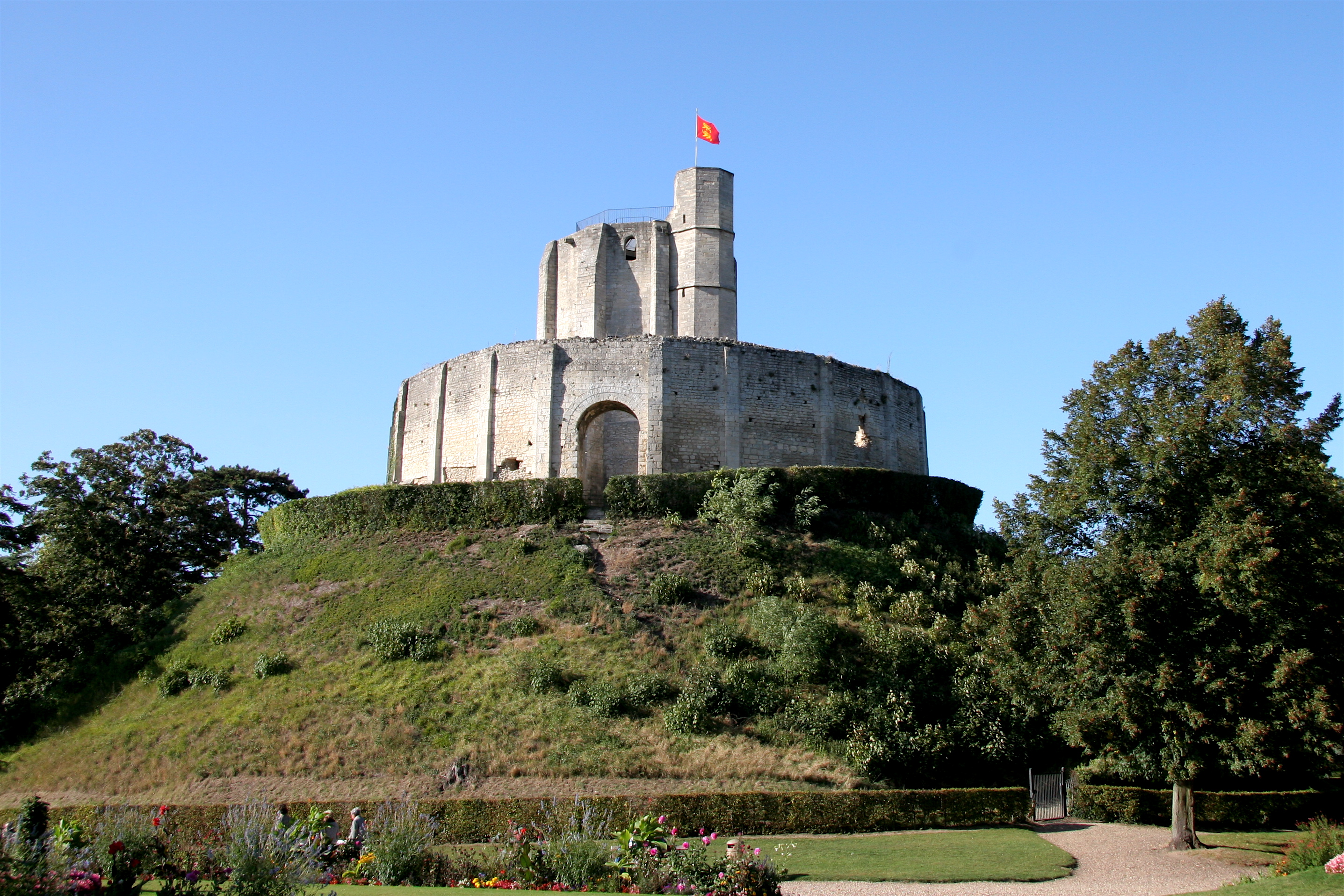
Castle at Gisors

The cutting of the elm was a diplomatic altercation between the kings of France and England in 1188, during which an elm tree near Gisors in Normandy was felled.

== Diplomatic significance ==
France in 1180. The King of England held all the red territories. Gisors lay in the Vexin, between Anglo-Norman land and the royal domain.

In the 12th century, the tree marked the traditional place of Franco-Norman negotiations, as the field was located on the border between Normandy, ruled by the English king, and the royal domains of the French king.

== Accounts ==
One account narrates the meeting between King Henry II of England and King Philip II of France in 1188, following the fall of Jerusalem:

At Gisors, Henry II and his advisers stood under an Elm tree while Philip and his entourage suffered in the full heat of the sun. After the meeting, Philip ordered the tree cut down and hacked to pieces, sending the message that he would offer no quarter to the English.

A quite different account is given by the Minstrel of Rheims (c. 1260) in a thirteenth-century historical fiction:

King Richard sent a message to the counts of Sancerre and of Barre, telling them that they took the king's bread and gave him nothing in return but if they were brave enough to come to the elm tree at Gisors, he would consider them truly courageous. The French nobles sent the message back that they would come the next day, at the third hour, to cut the tree down, in spite of him. When the English king heard that they were coming to cut down the tree, he had the trunk reinforced with bands of iron, that were wrapped five times around it. The next morning the French nobles armed themselves, and assembled five squadrons of their men, one of which was led by the count of Sancerre, another by the count of Chartres, the third by the count of Vendôme, the fourth by the count of Nevers, and the fifth by Sir William of Barre and Sir Alain of Roucy. They rode up to the elm tree at Gisors, with the crossbowmen and carpenters out front, and they had in their hands sharp axes and good pointed hammers, with which to cut the bands that were fastened around the tree. They stopped at the elm tree, tore off the bands, and cut it down, in spite of all resistance.

== Popular culture ==
The event has been used in the history proposed by Pierre Plantard and other pseudo-historical theories. In this context, the Cutting of the elm was portrayed as marking the split between the Knights Templar and the Priory of Sion.

== See also ==
- List of individual trees
