= Anita Lihme =

American golfer and businesswoman (1903–1976)

- Princess Edouard Josef de Lobkowicz
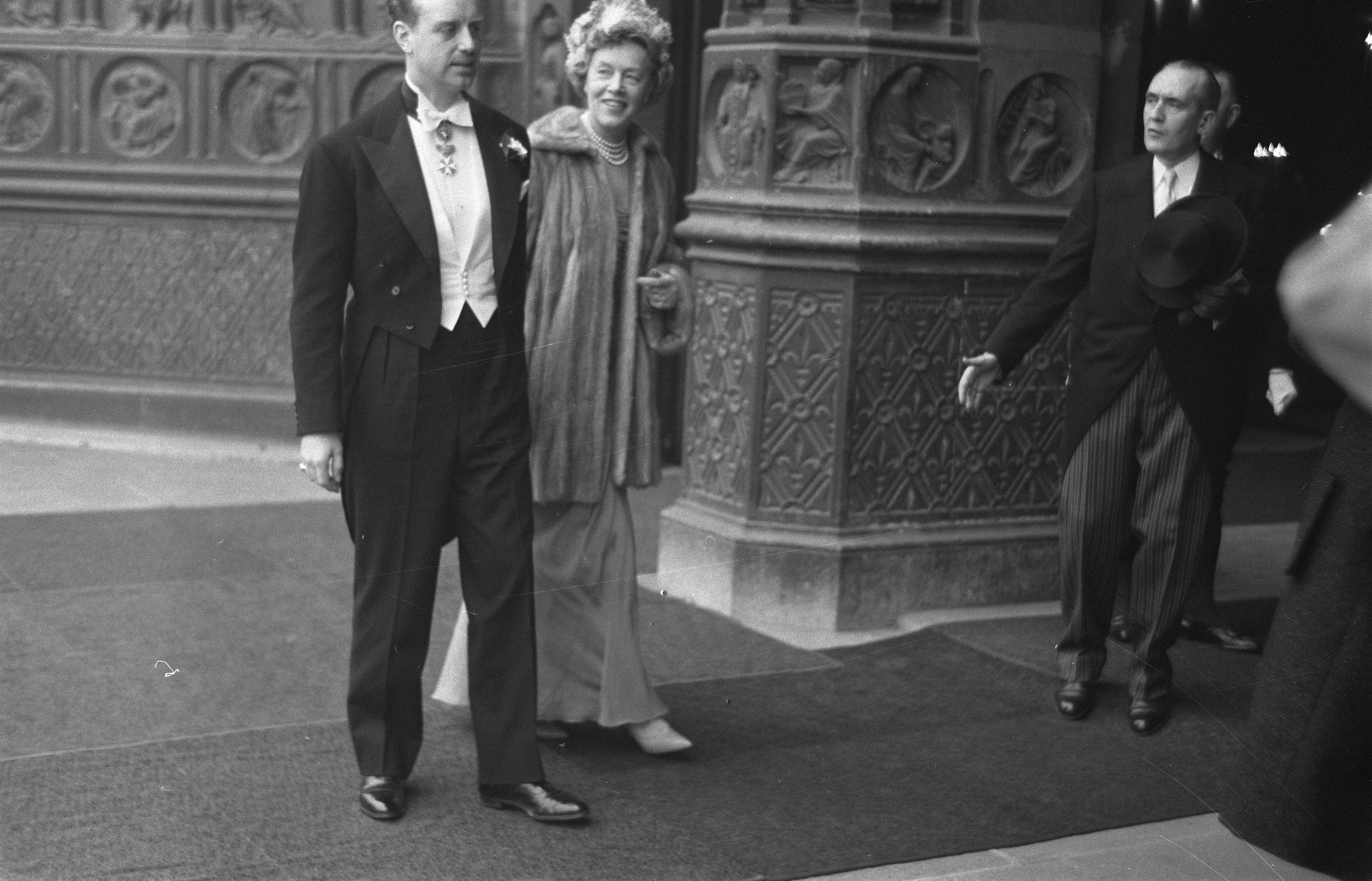
- Lihme with her eldest son, Prince Edouard, at his wedding in 1960
- Born: Anita Hegeler Lihme; November 4, 1903; Chicago, Illinois, U.S.
- Died: May 14, 1976 (aged 72)
- Spouse: Prince Edouard Josef de Lobkowicz (m. 1925; died 1959) Erwin Hoy Watts (m. 1960; died 1964) John Carroll Griswold (m. 1972)
- Issue: Prince Edouard de Lobkowicz; Prince George de Lobkowicz; Princess Anita, Countess de Cosse-Brissac
- House: Lobkowicz (by marriage)
- Father: C. Bai Lihme
- Mother: Olga Hegeler
- Occupation: Golfer, businesswoman, real estate broker

Anita Hegeler Griswold (née Lihme), formerly Princess Edouard Josef de Lobkowicz (4 November 1903 – 14 May 1976) was an American golfer, businesswoman, and real estate broker. She served as vice president of Douglas Gibbons-Hollyday & Ives. Through her first marriage, she was a princess of the House of Lobkowicz, a Bohemian noble family.

== Early life ==
Lihme was born on November 4, 1903, in Chicago to Olga (née Hegeler) Lihme and C. Bai Lihme. Among her siblings were brothers Harold Hegeler Lihme and Edward Hegeler Lihme, and sister Olga Lihme, who married Clement A. Griscom, a grandson of Clement Griscom.

Her mother was a founder of the Watch Hill Yacht Club, was the daughter of German-born American zinc manufacturer Edward C. Hegeler. Her father, who was born in Denmark and came to America in 1899, was a chemist, industrialist, and art collector.

== Education and career ==
Lihme was educated at Miss Porter's School in Farmington, Connecticut, and attended Vassar College.

She had a successful career as an amateur golfer, and before her first marriage, was "woman champion of the Misquamicut Golf Club at Watch Hill." In 1922, she made her first appearance at the Berthellyn Cup at the Huntingdon Valley Country Club, just north of Philadelphia, where she reached the semifinals of this prestigious golf event. She would compete again at the event, which was held annually until 1941, in 1923. Lihme, who was known professionally as Mrs. Lobkowicz, began working as a real estate broker in 1951 and served as the vice president of Douglas Gibbons-Hollyday & Ives, until her retirement in 1972.

== Personal life ==
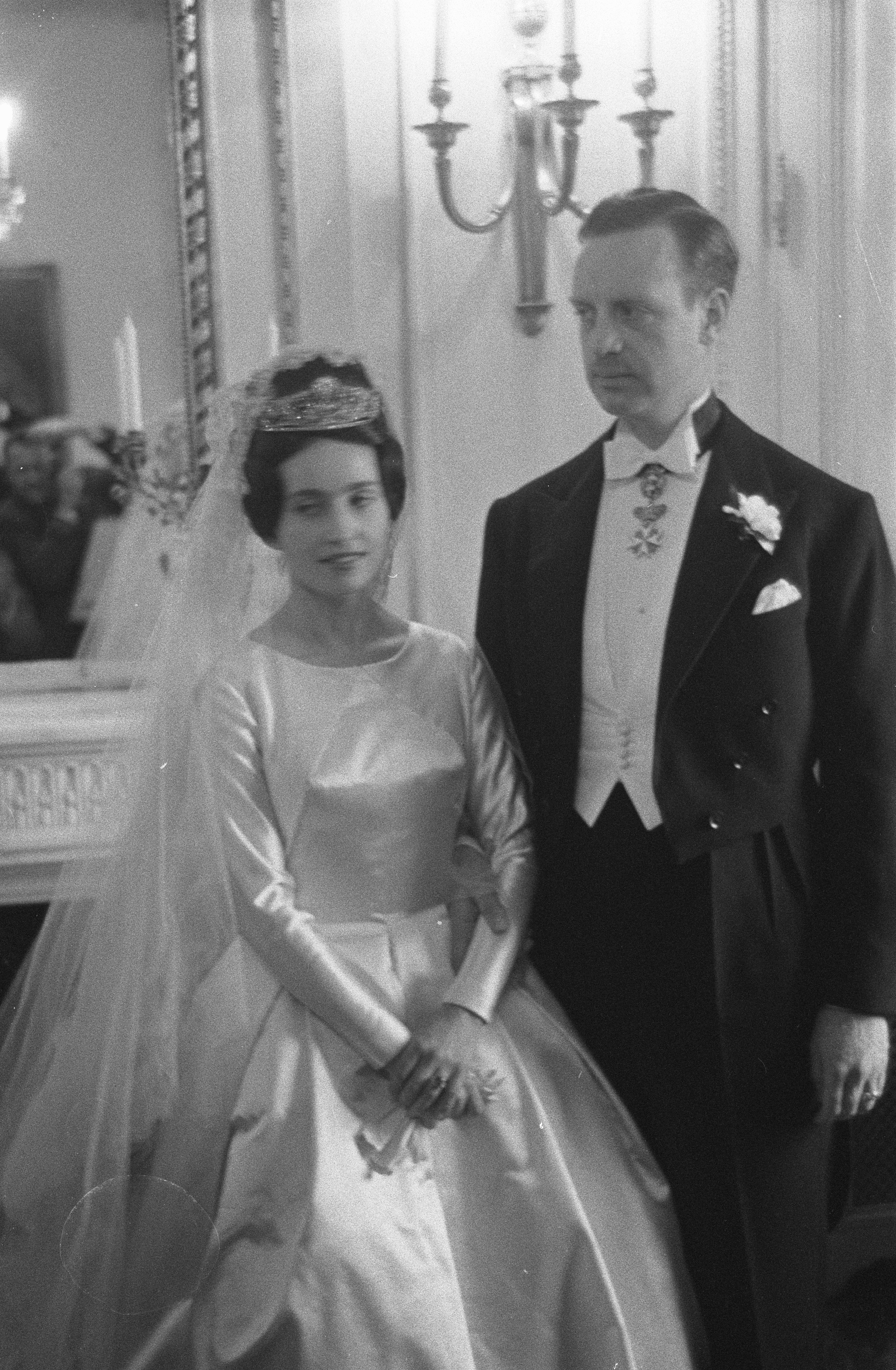
Anita's son on the day of his wedding to Princess Marie-Françoise of Bourbon-Parma in 1960.

On 29 August 1925, Lihme married Prince Edouard Josef de Lobkowicz (1899–1959) in a Catholic ceremony at Watch Hill Union Chapel in Watch Hill, Rhode Island. A reception was held at her family's summer home, Norman Hall. He was a son of the former Countess Irma Pálffy von Erdöd, Baroness von Újezd, of Bohemia and Prince August von Lobkowicz, Privy Counselor and Lord Chamberlain to the Emperor Franz Josef. After their marriage they lived at 280 Park Avenue, and later, 164 East 72nd Street, in New York City. Before Prince Edward's death in Freiburg, Germany, in January 1959, they were the parents of three children, two boys and a girl:

- Prince Edouard de Lobkowicz (1926–2010), who married Princess Marie-Françoise of Bourbon-Parma, the eldest daughter of Prince Xavier of Bourbon-Parma and of his wife, Madeleine de Bourbon-Busset. Their first son, Prince Edouard-Xavier de Lobkowicz, was found dead in Paris in 1984.
- Prince George Christian de Lobkowicz (1928–1950), who died unmarried at age twenty-one.
- Princess Anita Olga de Lobkowicz (b. 1937), who married Count Charles-Louis de Cossé-Brissac, a son of the Marquis de Cossé, in the fall of 1958.

After the death of her first husband, Anita married Erwin Hoy Watts, at St. Vincent Ferrer's Church in Manhattan in May 1960. Watts, a son of Ridley Watts and descendant of Henry Grinnell who had served with the Office of Strategic Services during World War II, won the Croix de Guerre for heroism as a volunteer ambulance driver with the American Field Service in France. After the war he joined the United Nations Relief and Rehabilitation Administration that aided displaced persons in Greece. Watts, who had previously been married to Alice Wheelock and Elizabeth S. Peet, died in 1964.

On 15 January 1972, Lihme married a third time to American business executive John Carroll Griswold in an ecumenical ceremony at Brick Presbyterian Church in Manhattan. The ceremony, a joint Catholic and Presbyterian wedding, was performed by Monsignor James G. Wilders of St. Thomas More Catholic Church and the Rev. Dr. Victor L. Baer of Brick Presbyterian. Griswold, a son of Harry Ross Griswold, was the founder and president of Griswold & Co., an insurance brokerage company that was acquired by Marsh & McLennan. At the time of their wedding, he was a senior vice president and director of Eastman Dillon, Union Securities & Co., Inc. investment bankers and brokers. From his first marriage to Marguerite Bessire, he was the father of a son, David Ross Griswold and a daughter, Mrs. John Vincent Earl.

She died on May 14, 1976, at her home, 50 East 77th Street in New York City. After a funeral at St. Thomas More's Roman Catholic Church, she was buried in Fairlawn Cemetery in Macon County, Illinois.
