= Prince Edouard-Xavier de Lobkowicz =

French aristocrat and murder victim (1960–1984)

Prince Edouard-Xavier
- Born: 18 October 1960; Paris, France
- Died: 27 April 1984 (aged 23); Ivry-sur-Seine, Val-de-Marne, France
Names
- Marie Edouard-Xavier Ferdinand Auguste Gaspard de Lobkowicz
- House: Lobkowicz
- Father: Prince Edouard de Lobkowicz
- Mother: Princess Marie-Françoise of Bourbon-Parma
- Occupation: military officer

Prince Marie Edouard-Xavier Ferdinand Auguste Gaspard de Lobkowicz (18 October 1960 – 27 April 1984) was a French aristocrat, military officer, and murder victim. The eldest son of Prince Edouard de Lobkowicz and Princess Marie Françoise of Bourbon-Parma, he was a member of the Lobkowicz family and a descendant of the House of Bourbon-Parma and the House of Bourbon-Busset. Prince Edouard-Xavier was a trained paratrooper who served as a lieutenant in the Reserve of the French Army and was a member of the Sovereign Military Order of Malta.

On 2 April 1984, Prince Edouard-Xavier went missing. A few weeks later, on 27 April 1984, his body was discovered in the Seine. An autopsy revealed that he had been murdered, with a gunshot wound in the throat and left shoulder blade.

== Early life and family ==
Prince Edouard-Xavier was born at the American Hospital of Paris on 18 October 1960 to Prince Edouard de Lobkowicz and Princess Marie Françoise of Bourbon-Parma. He was a member of the House of Lobkowicz, a Czech princely house. His paternal grandparents were Prince Edouard Josef von Lobkowicz and the American golfer and businesswoman Anita Lihme. His maternal grandparents were Prince Xavier of Bourbon-Parma, Duke of Parma and Piacenza, Carlist pretender to the Spanish throne and head of the House of Bourbon-Parma, and Madeleine de Bourbon-Busset, daughter of Georges de Bourbon-Busset, Count de Lignières and a member of the non-dynastic Bourbon-Busset line of the House of Bourbon. He was a great-grandson of the Danish-American industrialist C. Bai Lihme and a great-great-grandson of the American manufacturer Edward C. Hegeler.

Prince Edouard-Xavier was the nephew of Carlos Hugo, Duke of Parma, Princess María Teresa of Bourbon-Parma, Princess Cécile, Countess of Poblet, and Prince Sixtus Henry, Duke of Aranjuez. He was the older brother of Princess Marie-Gabrielle, Prince Robert, and Prince Charles-Henri.

After graduating from secondary school in France, he attended the University of San Francisco, graduating with a bachelor's degree in 1983. He had plans of working in finance.

Prince Edouard-Xavier was a lieutenant in the Reserve of the French Army and had done active service as a paratrooper. A devout Catholic, he was a Knight of Honor and Devotion of the Sovereign Military Order of Malta.

== Disappearance and murder ==
On 2 April 1984, Prince Edouard-Xavier left his parents' Paris residence for an appointment after receiving a telephone call. Two days later, his parents reported his disappearance to the French authorities. A few weeks later, his car was discovered in the parking lot of the Gare de Lyon. His body, partly decomposed, was discovered on 27 April 1984 in the waters of the Seine, southeast (upstream) of Paris in Ivry-sur-Seine. An autopsy revealed that he was shot in the throat and left shoulder blade, and that his body had been in the water "for some time". His remains remained unidentified for over a week after the discovery, and his family was not notified until 4 May 1984. He was shot with a hunting rifle and his body was tossed into the Seine River, weighed down by a large iron bar tied around his waist.

An investigation was opened after his death, but no reason was found as to why he had been murdered. The French newspaper France-Soir ran a story suggesting that he had been abducted and murdered due to his mother's connections with charitable organizations for Lebanese Christians and because of his father's association with the arms industry.
