= C. Bai Lihme =

Danish-American chemist, industrialist and art collector (1866–1946)

- Born: Christian Bai Lihme; May 24, 1866; Aalborg, Denmark
- Died: October 15, 1946 (aged 80); New York City, New York, U.S.
- Education: University of Copenhagen; University of Heidelberg
- Spouse: Olga Hegeler (m. 1901)
- Children: 4, including Anita Lihme
- Parent(s): Herman Rehling Lihme; Hermantine Moser Lihme
- Relatives: Prince Edouard de Lobkowicz (grandson)

Christian Bai Lihme (May 24, 1866 – October 15, 1946) was a Danish-born naturalized American chemist, industrialist, and art collector.

== Early life ==
Lihme was born in Aalborg, Denmark on May 24, 1866. He was the son of Herman Rehling Lihme (1819–1890) and, his second wife, Hermantine Adolphine (née Moser) Lihme (b. 1836).

After attending the Aalborg Latin School, he went to the University of Copenhagen, where he specialized in chemistry and graduated in 1888, followed by studies at the School of Mines at Freiberg, Saxony.

== Career ==
After graduating from University in 1888, Lihme came to the United States and became the chief chemist of the Pennsylvania Lead Company of Pittsburgh, a position he held until 1893. He moved to Germany where he studied at the University of Heidelberg, returning to the U.S. in 1895 to become superintendent of the Illinois Zinc Company in Peru, Illinois and founded the Lihme Zinc Company. In 1910, Lihme succeeded his father-in-law, Edward C. Hegeler, as president of the Matthissen & Hegeler Zinc Company of LaSalle, Illinois, founded by Hegeler and Frederick William Matthiessen in 1858. Lihme, who had been secretary and vice-president before becoming president, retired in 1921.

He also served as a director of several banks and mining corporations including the Hill State Bank of Chicago, the Equitable Trust Company of Chicago, Whiting & Co. of Chicago, the Quapaw Mining Corporation of Delaware, and the Mamarack Mining Company of Montana.

== Personal life ==
In 1901, Lihme married the Olga Hegeler (1878–1956), the youngest daughter of Edward C. Hegeler, a pioneer zinc smelter who had been born in Germany. Together, the couple were the parents of four children, two sons and two daughters:

- Olga Lihme (1902–1955), who married Clement Acton Griscom III (1899–1983), a grandson of Clement Griscom.
- Anita Lihme (1903–1976), who married Prince Edward Joseph Lobkowicz (1899-1959), son of Prince August Lobkowicz (1862-1921), Privy Counselor and Lord Chamberlain to Emperor Franz Josef, and Countess Mária 'Irma' Pálffy de Erdőd (1866-1950), of Bohemia, was a lady-in-waiting to the Austrian Court.
- Harold Hegeler Lihme (1907–1964), who married Barbara Wall. They divorced and he remarried to the former Princess Jane Wheeler (née Irby) Obolensky (1914–1981), the former wife of Prince Alexis Obolensky, in 1953. His second marriage also ended in divorce.
- Edward Hegeler Lihme (1910–1999)

He was a member of the Metropolitan Club, the River Club and The Union League Clubs of New York.

After a long illness, Lihme died at his home at 950 Fifth Avenue on October 15, 1946. He was buried at River Bend Cemetery in Westerly, Rhode Island. His widow died from a heart attack at their home in Palm Beach, Florida on November 9, 1956.

=== Art collection ===
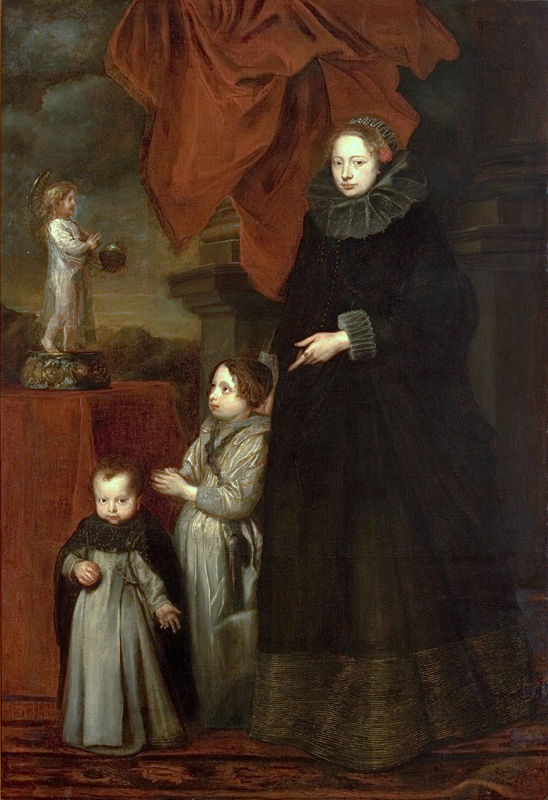
"Portrait of the Marchesa Lomellini" by Anthony van Dyck, c. 1623.

Following his 1921 retirement, Lihme began acquiring Flemish tapestries, porcelain and glassware, and notable artworks, including a number of paintings by internationally known artists as Peter Paul Rubens ("The Portrait of an Old Man"), Jean-Baptiste-Camille Corot, Van Ceulen, Rembrandt and others. In 1925, Lihme purchased "Portrait of the Marchesa Lomellini" for a reported sum of $200,000. The painting was one of seven famous works by Antony van Dyck that had hung for centuries in the Cattaneo Palace in Genoa. In 1927, an elevator operator at his New York residence "wrecked the interior of his apartment, including many of its art objects, because he thought he was entitled to a bonus."

=== Residences ===
The Lihmes lived in Chicago before moving to New York City where they first lived at 280 Park Avenue, at the corner of 48th Street. Around 1927, the family moved uptown to a triplex apartment at 950 Fifth Avenue, on the northeast corner of 76th Street. 950 Fifth Avenue, which overlooked Central Park, was a fourteen-story building designed by James Edwin Ruthven Carpenter Jr., and completed in January 1927 in the Italian-Renaissance palazzo-style.

In 1916, Lihme acquired "Norman Hall", the former "cottage" of William W. Lawrence (a vice president of the National Lead Company) located at Watch Hill near Newport, Rhode Island. The 10,000-square-foot stone house, later known as Lihme Castle, was completed in 1916, a month before Lawrence's death, and designed by New York architect Mott B. Schmidt and modeled after a French chateau. In the 1950s and 1960s, the Lihme's rented Norman Hall to Charles W. Engelhard Jr., chairman of Engelhard Minerals and Chemicals Inc. In 1965, the Lihmes sold the cottage for $110,000 to the Sisters of St. Joseph of Chambéry as a retreat house.

The Lihme family also owned a large oceanfront winter home in Palm Beach, Florida, located at South Ocean Boulevard and County Road and designed by society architect Addison Mizner.

=== Descendants ===
Through his daughter, Princess Edward Joseph de Lobkowicz, he was the grandfather of three: Prince Edouard de Lobkowicz (1926–2010), who married Princess Marie-Françoise of Bourbon-Parma, the eldest daughter of Prince Xavier of Bourbon-Parma and of his wife, Madeleine de Bourbon-Busset; Prince George Christian de Lobkowicz (1928–1950), who died unmarried at age twenty-one; and Princess Anita Olga de Lobkowicz (b. 1937), who married Count Charles-Louis de Cossé-Brissac, a son of the Marquis de Cossé, in the fall of 1958.
