= Charles-Henri de Lobkowicz =

Austrian prince (born 1964)

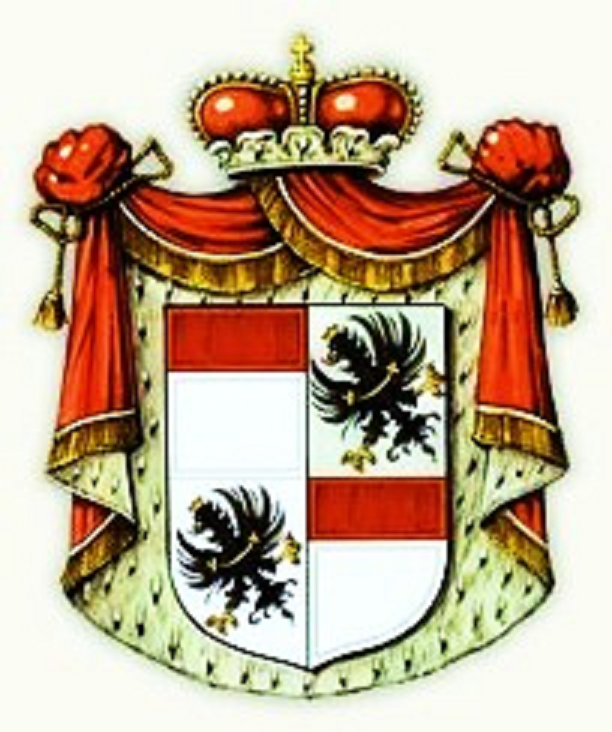
- Coat of arms of HSH Prince Charles-Henri de Lobkowicz
- Born: 17 May 1964 (age 62); Paris, France
Names
- Marie Charles-Henri Hugues Xavier Benoît Michel Edouard Joseph Balthazar de Lobkowicz
- House: Lobkowicz
- Father: Prince Edouard de Lobkowicz
- Mother: Princess Marie-Françoise of Bourbon-Parma

Prince Marie Charles-Henri Hugues Xavier Benoît Michel Edouard Joseph Balthazar de Lobkowicz (born 17 May 1964) is a French nobleman and member of the House of Lobkowicz.

== Early life ==
Prince Charles-Henri is the third child of four siblings, only surviving son of Prince Edouard de Lobkowicz and Princess Marie-Françoise of Bourbon-Parma, proprietor of the château de Boszt in Besson, and heir to the manoir d'Ujezd in Goderville and the château de Lignières (Cher). His elder brother, Prince Edouard-Xavier de Lobkowicz, was murdered in Paris in 1984. He is an elder brother of the Catholic nun Princess Marie Gabrielle de Lobkowicz.

The family lived part of their youth on Avenue Marceau, in the 8th arrondissement of Paris.

He followed his boarding school education in Germany, England, Switzerland, and France while making frequent visits to Lebanon where his parents spent part of the year. He graduated from Duke University in Durham, North Carolina with degrees in art history and political science.

== Career ==
Prince Charles-Henri owns four French châteaus located in the Bourbonnais, which he is trying to restore with local help: the Château de Fourchaud, Château du Vieux-Bost, Château du Nouveau-Bostz, and Château de Rochefort. Malcoiffée archaeologists, Sébastien Talour, and Elisabeth Chalmin-Sirop have worked to restore the historic buildings to their former glory for the sake of expanding French historical patrimony.

In addition, Prince Charles-Henri is a cultural ambassador for Chopard and has been linked to numerous celebrities including Katie Holmes and Kate Moss. He also appeared on The Oprah Winfrey Show discussing the duties of being a royal. Prince Charles-Henri also worked in the New York Stock Exchange as a money manager. A white wine has also been named after him.

Prince Charles-Henri was an executive producer of the 2018 film The Aspern Papers.

Prince Charles-Henri wrote a blurb for the book The Royal House of Savoy: Unifiers of Italy by Gino Lupini.

A Knights of Honour and Devotion of the Sovereign Military Order of Malta, Prince Charles-Henri was a Patron of the White Cross Ball of NYC.
