= Prince Edouard de Lobkowicz =

Austrian prince

Prince Edouard
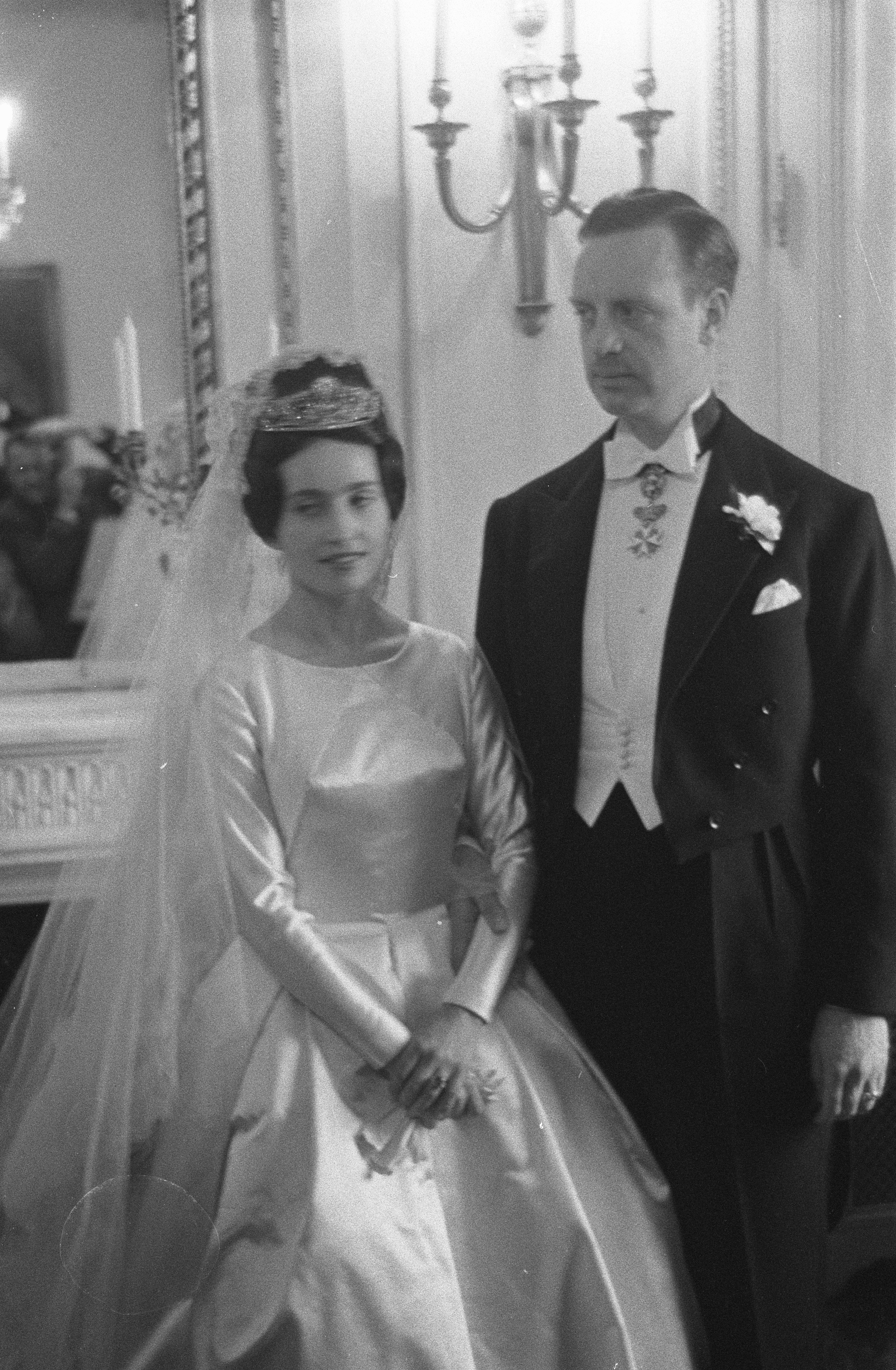
- Marie-Françoise and Edouard on their wedding day in 1960.
- Born: 12 June 1926; New York City, U.S.
- Died: 2 April 2010 (aged 83); Paris, France
- Spouse: Princess Marie-Françoise of Bourbon-Parma (m. 1959)
- Issue: Prince Edouard-Xavier; Prince Robert Emanuel; Prince Charles-Henri; Princess Marie Gabrielle
Names
- Maria Eduard August Joseph Wilhelm Ignatius Patricius Hubertus Kaspar
- House: Lobkowicz
- Father: Prince Eduard Josef von Lobkowicz
- Mother: Anita Lihme
- Occupation: Investment banker, dignitary

Prince Edouard de Lobkowicz (12 June 1926 – 2 April 2010) was an Austrian-American diplomat and investment banker. A member of the House of Lobkowicz, he served as the ambassador of the Sovereign Military Order of Malta to Lebanon.

== Early life ==
Lobkowicz was the elder son of Prince Edouard Josef von Lobkowicz (1899–1959) and his American wife, Anita Lihme (1903–1976). Since he was born in the United States, he held American citizenship. He was baptised with the names Maria Eduard August Joseph Wilhelm Ignatius Patricius Hubertus Kaspar.

Lobkowicz was educated at the Lycée Saint-Louis-de-Gonzague in Paris. From 1944 to 1947, he served in the United States Army. He then completed his tertiary education at the University of Paris and at Harvard University.

== Banking career ==
From 1951 to 1958, Lobkowicz worked at Chase Manhattan Bank in New York. In 1960, he became assistant to the director of the investment firm A. L. Stamm, and in 1963, delegate for Europe and the Middle East of the same firm. In 1969, he transferred to Coleman and Co. From 1972 to 1989, he worked for Stralem and Co.

== Marriage and family ==
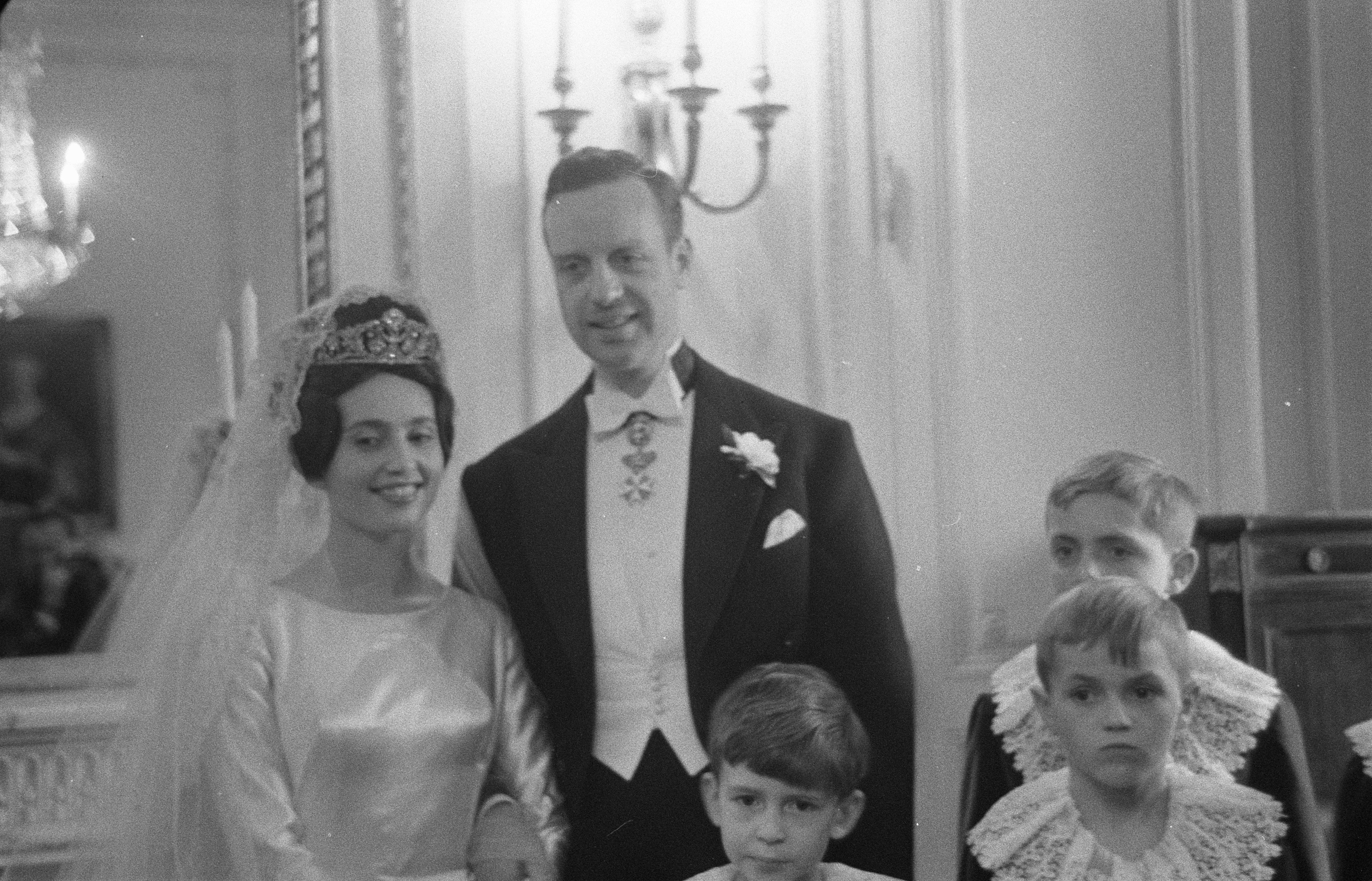
The couple on their wedding day

On 11 December 1959, at Besson, Allier, France, Lobkowicz was married civilly to Princess Marie-Françoise of Bourbon-Parma, eldest daughter of Prince Xavier of Bourbon-Parma and his wife, Madeleine de Bourbon-Busset. A religious wedding followed on 7 January 1960, in Notre-Dame de Paris; this was the first marriage of a member of the House of Bourbon at Notre Dame since the 1816 wedding of Charles Ferdinand, Duke of Berry, to Princess Caroline of Naples and Sicily.

Lobkowicz and his wife had four children:

- Prince Marie Edouard-Xavier Ferdinand Auguste Gaspard (18 October 1960, Paris – 27 April 1984, Ivry-sur-Seine); murdered.
- Prince Marie Robert Emanuel Joseph Michel Benoît Melchior (31 December 1961, Paris – 29 October 1988, Bhannes, Lebanon); died of a brain tumor.
- Prince Marie Charles-Henri Hugues Xavier Benoît Michel Edouard Joseph Balthazar (born 17 May 1964, Paris).
- Princess Marie Gabrielle Anita Olga Thérèse Lisieux Gaspara (born 11 June 1967, Paris); a member of the Little Sisters of the Poor.

== Sovereign Military Order of Malta ==
Lobkowicz was an active member of the Sovereign Military Order of Malta. He entered the order as a Knight of Honour and Devotion, but later became a Knight in Obedience. Eventually, he advanced to the degree of a knight grand cross.

In 1980, Lobkowicz was appointed the Order's ambassador to Lebanon, a position he held until 1990. In 1981, he set up the Order's Lebanese Association. In 1987, Lobkowicz and his wife founded the Association Malte Liban. Under Lobkowicz’s leadership, the Order’s medical centres increased from one to thirteen.

Lobkowicz died on Friday, 2 April 2010, in Paris. His Requiem Mass was celebrated in the Église Saint-Thomas-d'Aquin.

== Honours ==
- France: Commander of the Legion of Honour (from 14 July 2005)
- Holy See: Commander of the Order of the Holy Sepulchre
- Holy See: Commander of the Order of St. Gregory the Great
- Ivory Coast: Grand Officer of the National Order of the Ivory Coast
- Italy: Grand Officer of the Order of Merit of the Italian Republic
- Lebanon: Grand Cordon of the National Order of the Cedar
- Sovereign Military Order of Malta: Grand Cross with Swords of the Order pro merito Melitensi
