= Princess Marie Françoise of Bourbon-Parma =

French humanitarian

Marie Françoise of Bourbon-Parma
- Princess Edouard de Lobkowicz
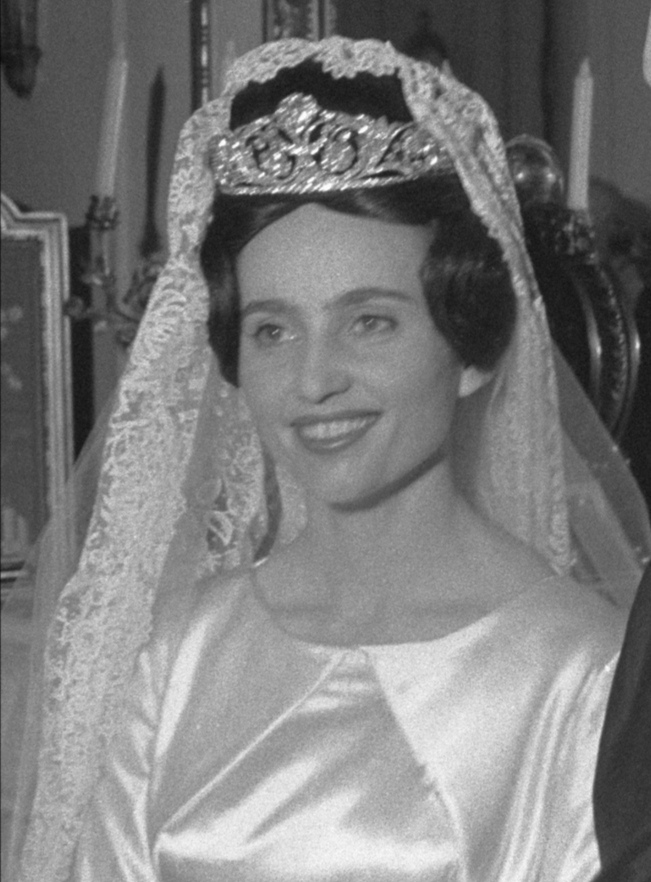
- Marie-Françoise on her wedding day in 1960
- Born: 19 August 1928 (age 98); Paris, French Third Republic
- Spouse: Prince Edouard de Lobkowicz (m. 1959; died 2010)
- Issue: Prince Edouard-Xavier; Prince Robert Emanuel; Prince Charles-Henri; Princess Marie Gabrielle
Names
- Marie-Françoise Antoinette Jeanne Madeleine de Bourbon-Parme
- House: Bourbon-Parma
- Father: Prince Xavier, Duke of Parma and Piacenza
- Mother: Madeleine de Bourbon-Busset
- Occupation: Humanitarian, philanthropist

Princess Marie-Françoise of Bourbon-Parma (Marie-Françoise Antoinette Jeanne Madeleine; born 19 August 1928), known upon her marriage as Princess Edouard de Lobkowicz, is a French humanitarian and philanthropist. A member of the House of Bourbon-Parma by birth and of the House of Lobkowicz by marriage, her religious wedding in 1960 was the first Bourbon wedding to take place at Notre-Dame de Paris since the wedding of Charles Ferdinand, Duke of Berry to Princess Caroline of Naples and Sicily in 1816 during the Bourbon Restoration.

After escaping the Hungarian Revolution of 1956 with the assistance of Catholic Relief Services, Marie-Françoise helped settle refugees in West Berlin who fled the Soviet Union. In the 1980s, while her husband, Prince Edouard de Lobkowicz, was serving as the Sovereign Military Order of Malta's ambassador to Lebanon, she was involved in the construction and development of twelve medical and social centers owned by the Order. Princess Marie-Françoise founded the Malte Liban Association, a Catholic organization that raises money for medical clinics serving the poor in Lebanon, in 1987. She served as a delegate to the United Nations from 1990 to 1995.

== Early life and family ==
Marie-Françoise was born on 19 August 1928 in Paris as the first child of Prince Xavier of Bourbon-Parma, Duke of Parma and Piacenza, and Madeleine de Bourbon-Busset. Her father was the titular Duke of Parma, the Carlist Pretender to the Spanish throne, and the Head of the House of Bourbon-Parma. Her mother, as the daughter of Georges de Bourbon-Busset, Count de Lignières, was a member of the non-dynastic Bourbon-Busset line of the House of Bourbon. She is a direct descendant of Louis XV of France and Philip V of Spain. She is the elder sister of Prince Carlos Hugo, Duke of Parma, Princess Marie-Thérèse, Princess Cécile Marie, Princess Marie des Neiges, and Prince Sixtus Henry, Duke of Aranjuez.

During the German occupation of France, her father was arrested by the Nazis and later deported to the Dachau concentration camp. After his detainment, she fled to Austria with assistance from Catholic Relief Services during the exodus of Hungarians during the Hungarian Revolution of 1956. She then settled in West Berlin.

== Humanitarian work ==
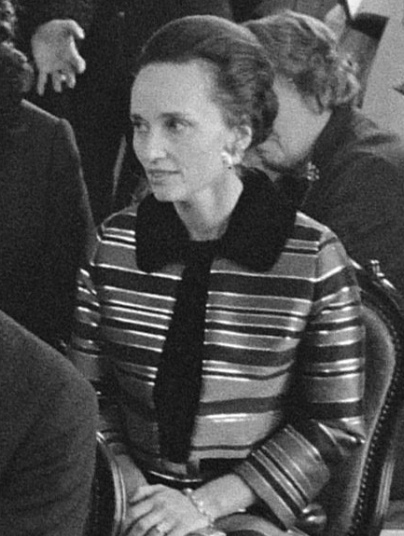
Marie-Françoise in 1970

While living in West Berlin, after escaping the Hungarian Revolution, Marie-Françoise volunteered with Catholic Relief Services to hold Russian refugees who escaped the Soviet Union.

In 1980, she and her family moved to Lebanon, where her husband was appointed ambassador for the Sovereign Military Order of Malta. In Lebanon she became involved in the construction and development of twelve medical-social centers owned by the Order. In 1987 she founded the Malte Liban Association, a Catholic organization which raises money for the medical clinics serving the poor.

Marie-Françoise was a member of the Saint-Siège delegation of the United Nations from 1990 to 1995.

== Personal life ==
On 11 December 1959 Marie-Françoise married Prince Edouard de Lobkowicz in a civil ceremony in Besson, Allier. A religious ceremony was held on 7 January 1960 at Notre-Dame de Paris. Their wedding was the first Bourbon wedding to take place at the cathedral since the wedding of Charles Ferdinand, Duke of Berry, to Princess Caroline of Naples and Sicily in 1816. They had four children:

- Prince Marie Edouard-Xavier Ferdinand Auguste Gaspard (18 October 1960, Paris – 27 April 1984, Ivry-sur-Seine)
- Prince Marie Robert Emanuel Joseph Michel Benoît Melchior (31 December 1961, Paris – 29 October 1988, Bhannes, Lebanon)
- Prince Marie Charles-Henri Hugues Xavier Benoît Michel Edouard Joseph Balthazar (born 17 May 1964, Paris)
- Princess Marie Gabrielle Anita Olga Thérèse Lisieux Gaspara (born 11 June 1967, Paris)

Marie-Françoise's oldest son, Edouard-Xavier, was murdered in Paris in 1984. Her second son, Robert Emanuel, died in 1988 from a brain tumor. Her husband died in 2010.

Marie-Françoise lives alternating between Paris and Lebanon.

== Later life ==
Princess Marie-Françoise participated in events held by the House of Bourbon-Parma in France, including visiting the Château de Nérac in August 2014. In September 2015, she attended a garden party in Souvigny for a family reunion of the various branches of the House of Bourbon. Her son Charles-Henri, Prince Louis, Duke of Anjou and Princess Marie-Marguerite, Duchess of Anjou were also attended. On 17 September 2018, Princess Marie-Françoise visited the Imam Sadr Foundation in Lebanon. Princess Marie-Françoise also spoke to various personalities working at the facility and toured the foundation complex. Marie-Françoise also attended the wedding of Jean-Christophe, Prince Napoléon and Countess Olympia von und zu Arco-Zinneberg on 19 October 2019 in Paris. On 28 September 2022, the Princess attended a religious service for the 35th anniversary of the founding of her association Malte Liban, at the Saint Elizabeth of Hungary Church, Paris. The Princess received congratulations from those present who attended the service. From 5 to 9 May 2023, Princess Marie-Françoise attended the Order of Malta's pilgrimage to Lourdes, participating in prayers and masses and meeting many people.

Marie-Françoise's relations with her brother Prince Carlos Hugo and with her sisters Princess Marie Thérèse, Princess Cécile Marie and Princess Marie des Neiges were strained due to their opposing views on Carlism. Their relationship had deteriorated to the point that Marie-Françoise did not attend Carlos Hugo's funeral in 2010. However in 2018, Marie-Françoise reconciled with her three younger sisters. She attended the funerals of her sisters Marie Thérèse in April 2020 and Cécile Marie in September 2021. She arrived at the funeral of the latter with her sister Marie des Neiges.

== Honours ==
- Sovereign Military Order of Malta:
  - Dame Grand Cross of Honour and Devotion of the Sovereign Military Order of Malta
- France:
  - Officer of the Order of the Legion of Honour
- Holy See:
  - Dame of Commandery of the Order of the Holy Sepulchre
