= Prince Xavier of Bourbon-Parma =

Duke of Parma (1889–1977)

Xavier
- Duke of Parma
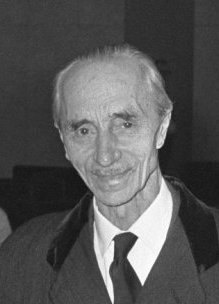
- Xavier in 1970

Head of the House of Bourbon-Parma
- Tenure: 15 November 1974 – 7 May 1977
- Predecessor: Duke Robert Hugo
- Successor: Duke Carlos Hugo

Carlist pretender to the Spanish throne
- Tenure: 20 May 1952 – 20 April 1975
- Predecessor: Alfonso Carlos (1936)
- Successor: Carlos Hugo
- Born: 25 May 1889; Villa Pianore, Lucca, Kingdom of Italy
- Died: 7 May 1977 (aged 87); Zizers, Switzerland
- Burial: Solesmes Abbey
- Spouse: Madeleine de Bourbon-Busset (m. 1927)
- Issue: Marie Françoise, Princess Edouard de Lobkowicz; Prince Carlos Hugo, Duke of Parma; Princess Marie Thérèse; Princess Cécile Marie, Countess of Poblet; Princess Marie des Neiges, Countess of Castillo de la Mota; Prince Sixtus Henry
Names
- Francis Xavier Charles Maria
- House: Bourbon-Parma
- Father: Robert I, Duke of Parma
- Mother: Infanta Maria Antónia of Portugal
- Religion: Roman Catholicism

Xavier, Duke of Parma and Piacenza, known in France before 1974 as Prince Xavier de Bourbon-Parme, known in Spain as Francisco Javier de Borbón-Parma y de Braganza or simply as Don Javier (25 May 1889 – 7 May 1977), was head of the ducal House of Bourbon-Parma. He is best known as dynastic leader of Carlism and the Carlist pretender to the throne of Spain, since 1936 as a regent-claimant and since 1952 as a claimant, appearing under the name Javier I. Since 1974, he was pretender to the defunct throne of Parma. He is also recognized as involved in the so-called Sixtus Affair of 1916–1917 and in the so-called Halifax-Chevalier talks of 1940.

== Road to Spain ==
=== Family ===
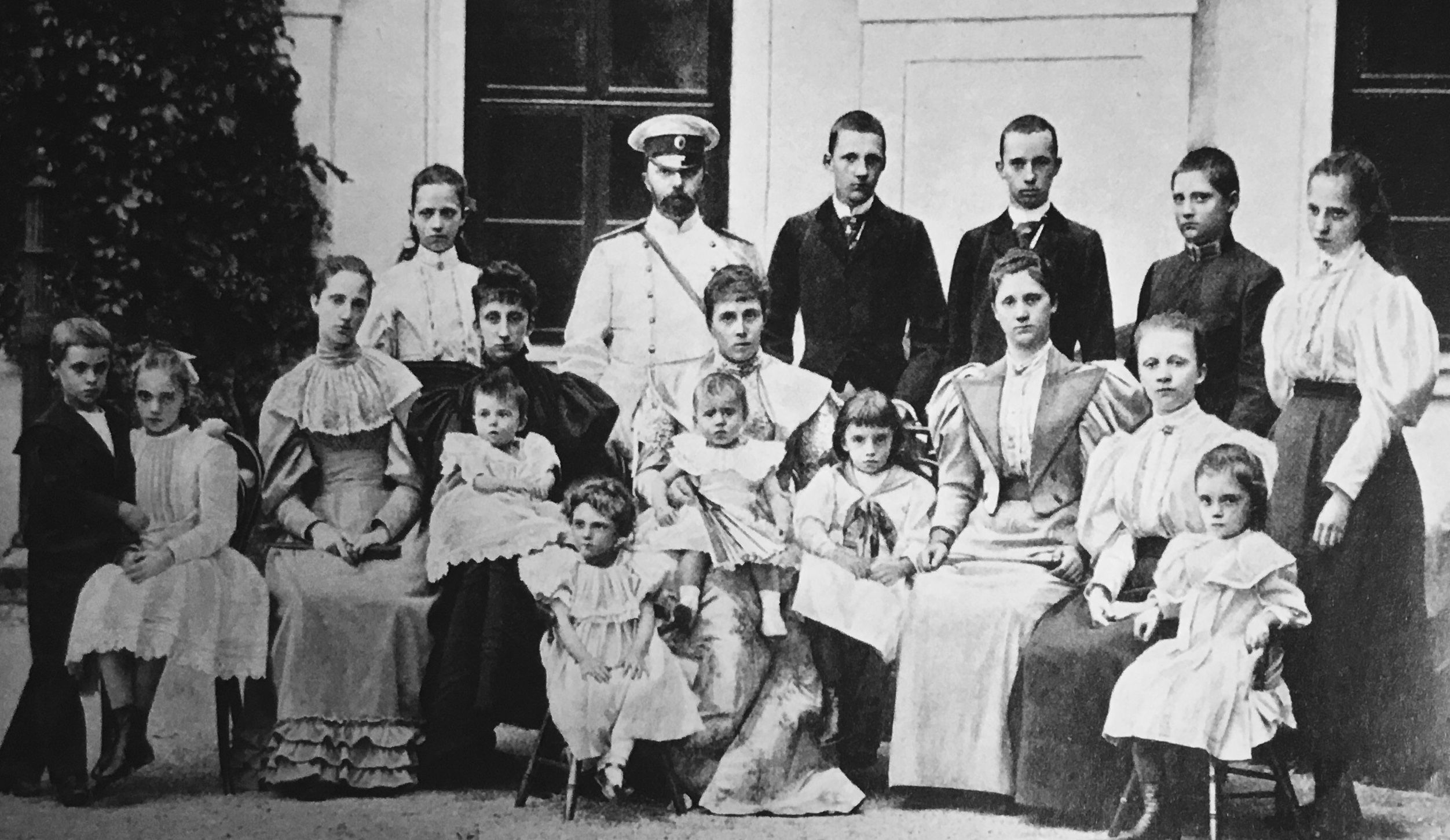
Duke Robert I of Parma and his family. Prince Xavier is the young boy next to his mother in the center of the picture.

Xavier was born into the House of Bourbon-Parma, an Italian cadet branch of the Spanish Bourbons, the royal family of Spain, who in turn had diverged from the French House of Bourbon in the 18th century. Xavier was a patrilineal descendant of Louis XIV and to the king of Spain Felipe V. Among his great-great-grandparents, Ludovico I was the king of Etruria, Vittorio Emanuele I was the king of Sardinia and the duke of Savoy, Charles X was the king of France, Francesco I was the king of Two Sicilies, Pedro III was the king of Portugal, Maria I was the queen of Portugal and Brazil, and Carlos IV was the king of Spain; among his great-grandparents, Carlo II was the duke of Parma and João VI was the king of Portugal; among his grandparents, Carlo III was the duke of Parma and Miguel I was the king of Portugal. Xavier's father, Robert I (1848–1907) was the last ruling duke of Parma, and Xavier's mother, Infanta Maria Antónia of Portugal (1862–1959), was exile-born daughter of the 1834-deposed king of Portugal.

Many of Xavier's uncles and aunts came from European royal or ducal families, though the only one actually ruling was his mother's sister, Infanta Maria Ana of Portugal, Grand Duchess of Luxembourg. The other three were claiming the throne: his mother's brother, the Portuguese Miguelist pretender Dom Miguel, Duke of Braganza, his father's sister, the Carlist queen of Spain Margarita de Borbón-Parma and another sister of his mother, also the Carlist queen of Spain, Infanta Maria das Neves of Portugal. One uncle, archduke Karl Ludwig, was official heir to the throne of Austro-Hungary. Of Xavier's cousins the only two who actually ruled were Elisabeth, the queen consort of Belgium and Charlotte, the Grand Duchess of Luxembourg. Xavier's step-cousin, archduke Franz Ferdinand, was official heir to the Austro-Hungarian throne. Two cousins were legitimist pretenders; along the paternal line Don Jaime, the Carlist claimant to the Spanish throne, and along the maternal line Dom Duarte Nuño, the Miguelist claimant to the Portuguese throne.

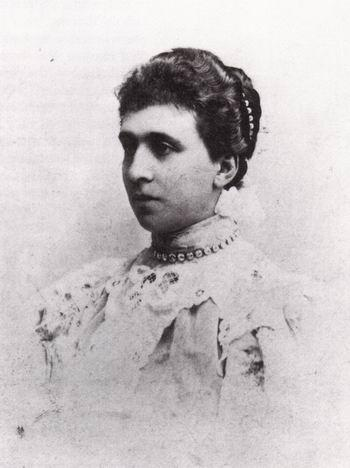
Xavier's mother

Some of Xavier's siblings have married into the ruling European houses and few have actually ruled: these were the cases of his younger sister Zita, who in 1911 married into the imperial Habsburg family to become the empress of Austria and the queen of Hungary in 1916–1918, and this of his younger brother Felix, who in 1919 married into the ducal Nassau family and was the duke-consort of Luxembourg in 1919–1970. Some of Xavier's siblings were closely related to actual rulers: these were the cases of his younger brother René, who in 1921 married into the royal Danish family, this of his younger brother Louis, who in 1939 married into the royal Italian family, and this of his older half-sister Maria Luisa, who in 1893 married into the royal Bulgarian family. Some of Xavier's siblings married into ducal or otherwise distinguished highly aristocratic houses. Six mentally handicapped older half-siblings have never married and three of Xavier's sisters became Benedictine nuns.

=== Infancy, childhood and youth (before 1914) ===
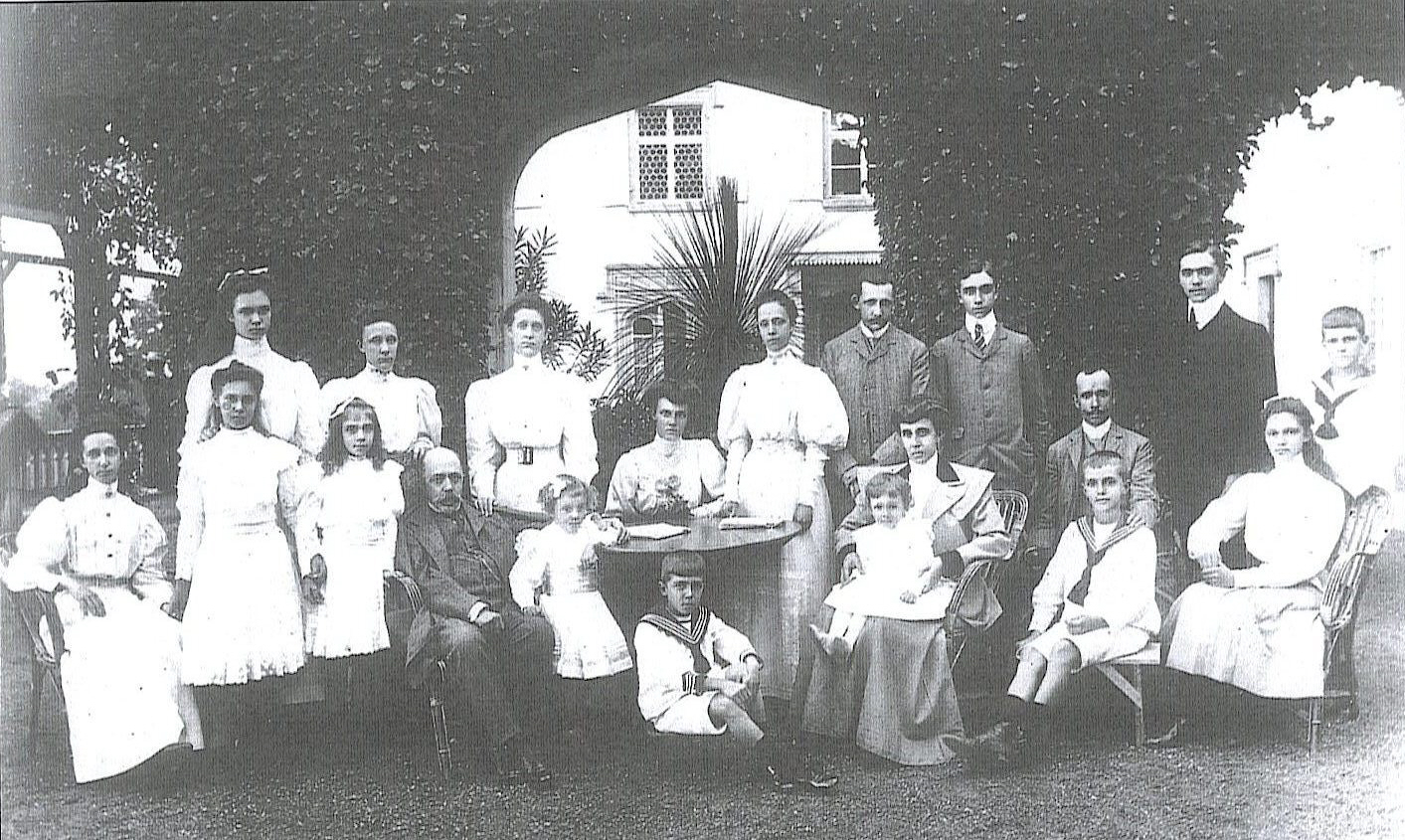
Xavier with his parents and siblings, 1906

Though deposed as Duke of Parma in 1859, Xavier's father kept claiming the title. He retained massive wealth, comprising estates in Italy and Austria; moreover, in the late 19th century the Bourbon-Parma inherited the magnificent Chambord castle. The family, consisting of Robert, his second wife and some 20 children from both marriages lived in two homes, in Pianore and in Schwarzau. They used to spend half a year in each location, shuttling in a special train and taking even children's horses with them. Xavier's childhood was full of serenity, luxury and cheerfulness, though relations with half-siblings from the first marriage were not equally cordial. The Bourbon-Parma were deeply Roman Catholic and essentially French in culture and understanding; another language spoken was German. In his childhood Xavier picked up also Italian – spoken with the Pianore locals, English – spoken with various visitors, Portuguese and Spanish – used in certain relations, and Latin – used in church. The family were frequently visited by guests from the world of aristocracy, books and universities.

In 1899 Xavier followed in the footsteps of his older brother Sixte and entered Stella Matutina, a prestigious Jesuit establishment in the Austrian Feldkirch. Though catering to Catholic aristocracy from all over Europe, the school offered Spartan conditions; when later enquired how he survived the Nazi concentration camp, prince Xavier joked: "I attended the Stella. It's not easy to kill us". The school ensured a model of humble religiosity, the staff ensured high teaching standards, and the mix of boys from different countries ensured a spirit of international comradeship. Xavier graduated in the mid-1900s; in 1906 moved to Paris, still trailing his older brother and commencing university studies. Unlike Sixte, who studied law, he pursued two different paths: political-economic sciences and agronomy. He completed both, graduating as engineer in agronomy and doctor in politics/economy. The year or years of him completing the curriculum are not clear; one source points to 1914. He has never commenced a professional career.

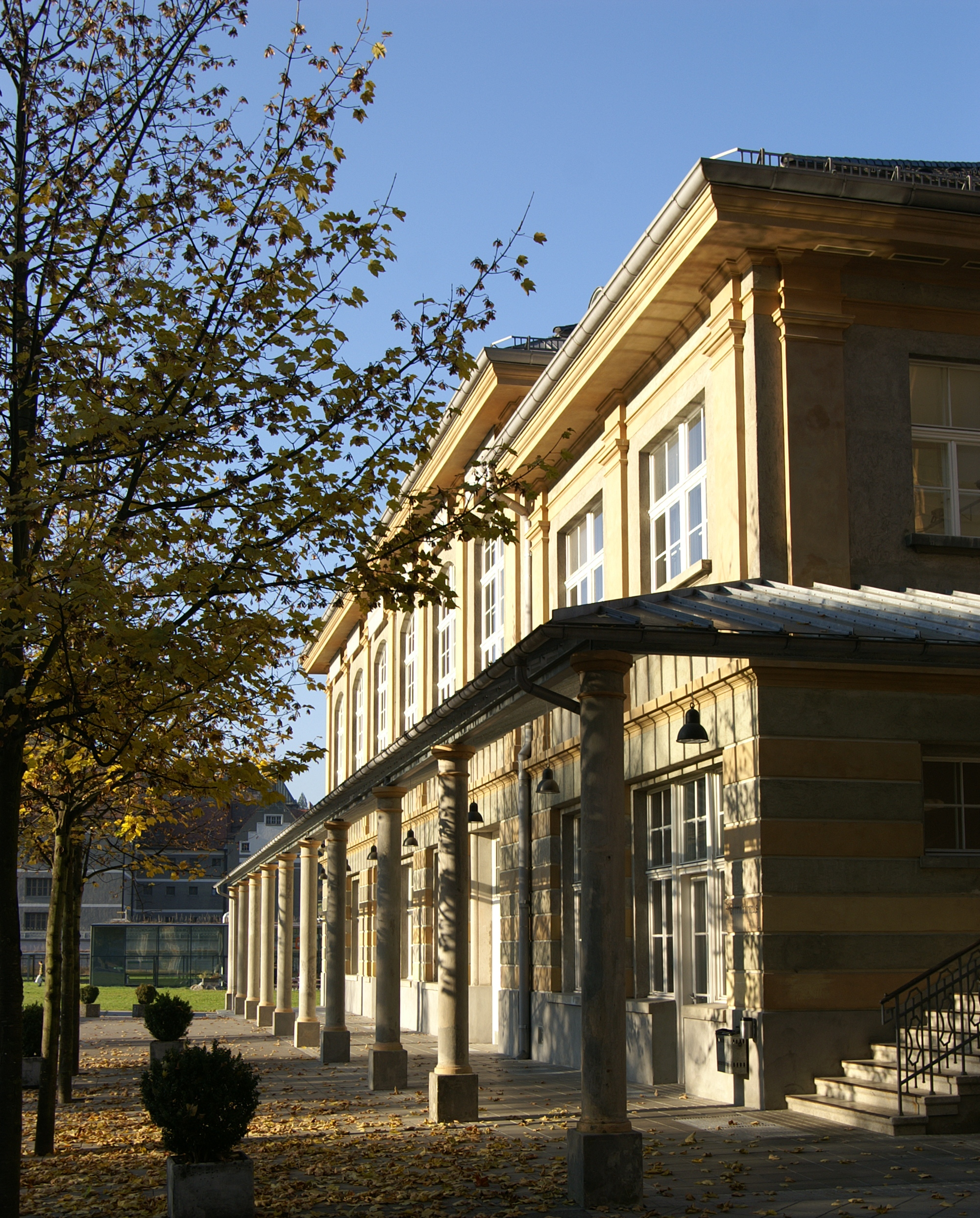
Stella Matutina building

In 1910 the wealth of the late Robert Bourbon-Parma was divided among the family. Children from the first marriage, and especially Élie, custodian of his handicapped siblings, were allocated most of the real estate; Robert's second wife and children from the second marriage were earmarked hefty financial compensation, usufruct rights and minor properties. Already on his own, Xavier was based in Paris but cruised across Europe. One reason was family business, often with political background; e.g. in 1911 Xavier travelled to Austria to attend the wedding of his sister with archduke Karl Habsburg, heir to the Austro-Hungarian throne; in 1912 he travelled via Spain to Portugal, accompanying his aunt during a Portuguese legitimist plot. Another reason was following his personal interest. Xavier seemed heavily influenced by Sixte, who developed a knack for geographical exploration. In 1909 both brothers travelled to the Balkans; in 1912 they roamed across Egypt, Palestine and the Near East. In 1914 they intended to travel to Persia, India and possibly the Himalayas.

=== Soldier and diplomat (1914–1918) ===
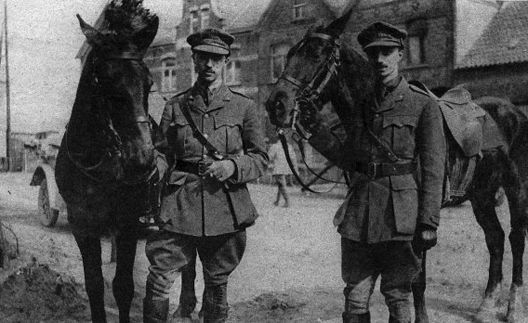
Prince Sixte (left) and Prince Xavier in Belgian military service during the Great War

News of the Sarajevo assassination reached Xavier and Sixte in Austria, en route to Asia. Enraged by murder of their step-cousin, both brothers intended to enlist in the Austrian army to pursue revenge. Things changed when France declared war on Vienna. Though some of the Bourbon-Parma siblings – Zita, René, Felix and Élie – sided with Austria-Hungary, with males joining the imperial troops, Xavier and Sixte felt themselves thorough Frenchmen. They openly made plans to enlist in the French army, which might have evoked their detention. It took personal appeals from Zita before the Emperor took steps which prevented their incarceration, and allowed them to leave Austria for a neutral country. When back in France Xavier and Sixte indeed volunteered, only to find that French law banned members of foreign dynasties from serving. Determined to fight, they contacted their cousin, Queen Elisabeth of Belgium, who saw to it that both were allowed to serve in the Belgian military. Due to a car accident involving Sixte, however, the brothers joined the ranks of the Belgian army no sooner than late November 1914. Xavier was initially accepted as a private in medical services and was seconded to the 7th artillery regiment. Exact details of his service are not clear; what was left of the pre-war Belgian army served on a relatively calm sector of the frontline in Flanders and France, next to the English Channel. At an unspecified time Xavier was released from the line and assigned to an officer training course, organized by the Belgian general staff, which he completed. By mid-1916 he was sub-lieutenant, later promoted to captain.

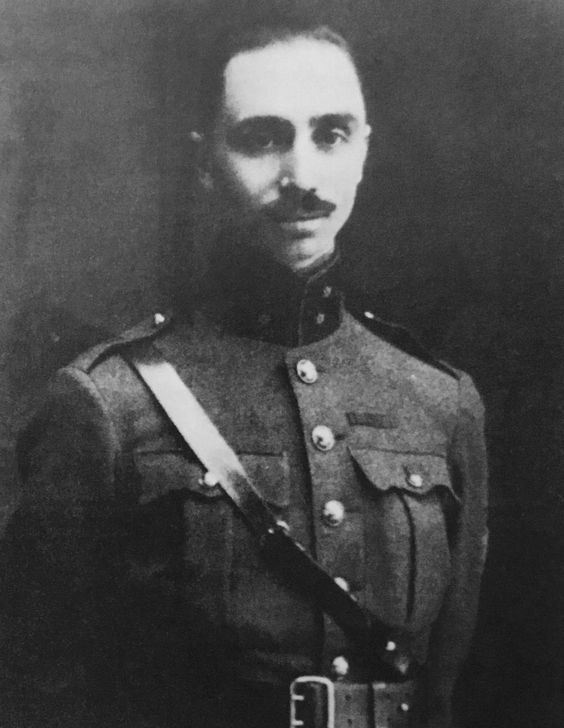
Prince Xavier, ca 1915

In late 1916 Xavier became involved in the Sixtus Affair, a secret Austrian attempt to conclude a separatist peace. The new emperor, Karl I, decided to exploit his family ties and friendship with the Bourbon-Parma brothers, trusting especially in the skills and intelligence of Sixte. As French citizens, both agreed to undertake the mission only upon obtaining the consent of the French government. The role of Xavier is generally considered secondary to that of Sixte, though he was present during some crucial meetings, whether with the French authorities in Paris or with the Austro-Hungarian envoys in Switzerland, and in Vienna; and some scholars do refer to "mediation des princes Sixte et Xavier". Negotiations broke down in early 1917 and the matter seemed closed; leaked by Clemenceau in May 1918, it turned into a political crisis and a scandal, which damaged the prestige of the young emperor. Xavier and Sixte, at that time in Vienna, were considered endangered, menaced either by the Austrian foreign minister Czernin's willingness to eliminate witnesses, or as victims of popular wrath. The incident is considered "perhaps the ultimate example of amateurish aristocratic diplomacy gone awry during the First World War", although none of the sources consulted tends to blame Xavier for the final failure. It is not clear whether he returned to military service afterwards. At the moment of the armistice he was a major in the Belgian army, awarded the French Croix de Guerre, the Belgian Croix de Guerre, and the Belgian Ordré de Léopold.

=== Plaintiff and husband (1920s) ===
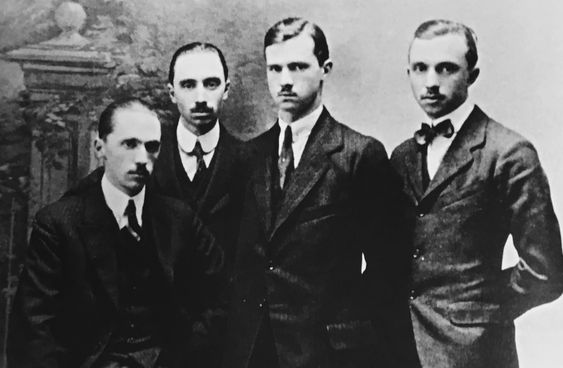
Xavier (2fL) among his brothers

Immediately after the war Xavier was engaged in assisting Zita and Karl following their deposition. In 1919 together with Sixte he travelled to England and contacted king George V; the British support materialized as a liaison officer, dispatched to the republican Austria to assist the unhappy couple on their route to exile. However, it soon turned out that it was his own business which attracted most of Xavier’s attention. Following wartime financial turmoil and expropriations of some family estates, economic prospects of both brothers seemed rather bleak. As a counter-measure, they decided to challenge the French state, which in 1915 seized Chambord as property of Élie, the Austrian officer; the Versailles Treaty stipulations allowed to conclude the seizure legally if combined with paying compensation fee. Sixte and Xavier sued; they claimed that the family-agreed 1910 partition, based on the Austrian concept of an indivisible majorate, was not applicable in the French law, and that the Chambord property should be divided; they claimed also that as volunteers to the French and Belgian armies, they should be exempted from expropriation procedure. Centred on fortune-worth Chambord property, in fact the lawsuit was directed against Élie. In 1925 the court accepted brothers’ point of view, the decision immediately appealed by their half-brother. In 1928 the case was overturned in favor of Élie, the decision appealed by both brothers. In 1932 the Court of Cassation upheld the 1928 decision, which eventually left Xavier and Sixte frustrated in their bid.

Resident in Paris and living off the family wealth remaining, Xavier reached his mid-30s when he was attracted to Madeleine de Bourbon-Busset, 9 years his junior, daughter to Count de Lignières and descendant to a cadet branch of the French Bourbons. The Bourbon-Bussets have been related to a centuries-old aristocratic controversy; historically regarded non-dynastic as set up in the 15th century by an illegitimate relationship, by enemies the branch was lambasted as bastards. Would-be marriage of prince Xavier and Madeleine might have resulted in stripping their children off Bourbon-Parma ducal heritage rights, depending upon decision of head of the branch. Since the death of Robert, it was Élie who headed the family; he declared the would-be marriage non-dynastic and morganatic. Despite this stand, Xavier wed Madeleine in 1927 and some newspapers titled her "princesse".

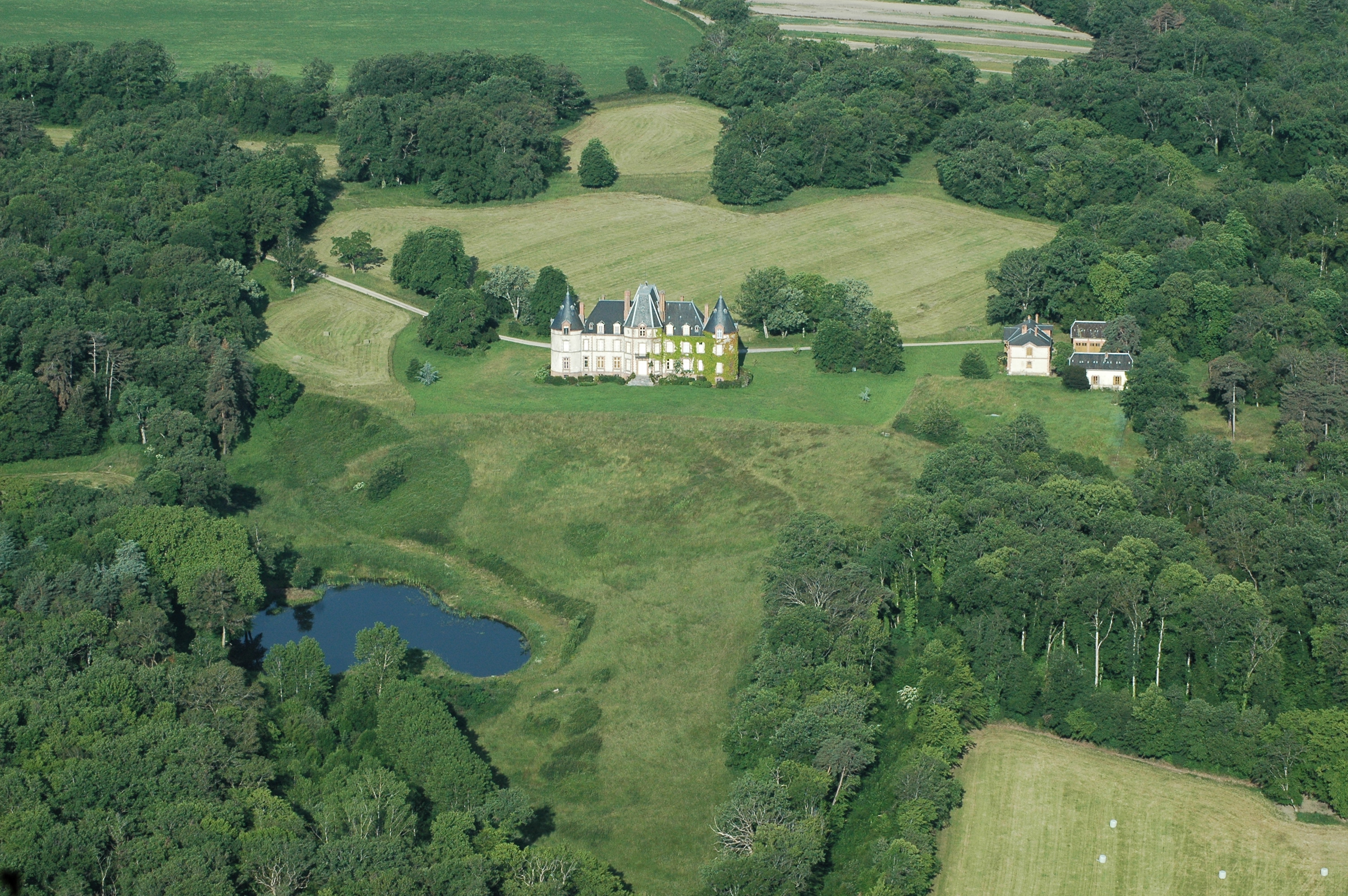
Bostz

As the Bourbon-Bussets enjoyed significant wealth the marriage changed financial status of Xavier, especially that Madeleine had no living older brothers. The couple settled in Bostz castle, where Xavier managed the rural economy of his in-laws; their first child was born in 1928, to be followed by the other 5 throughout the 1930s. Following the 1932 death of his father-in-law, Xavier became head of the family business, crowned with the Lignières castle. Little is known of his public activity at that time, except that he was engaged in various non-political though conservatism-flavored Catholic initiatives. Perhaps the most happy period of his life was punctured by the premature 1934 death of Sixte, for decades Xavier’s best friend and sort of a mentor.

=== From prince Xavier to Don Javier (1930s) ===
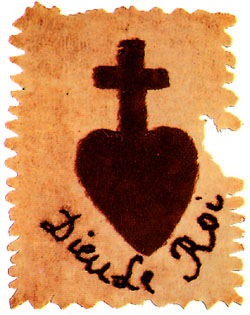
patch of Vendean royalists

Exact political views of Xavier are not clear; until the mid-1930s he did not engage in openly political activity, though he figured prominently in some French royalist initiatives. Himself son of a deposed ruler and his own sister deposed as empress, he had some relatives – associated with France, Spain and Portugal – engaged in legitimist politics, though others – associated with Luxembourg, Belgium, Denmark and Italy – fit rather in a general liberal-democratic monarchist framework. None of the sources consulted provides information on his views on ongoing French politics. Few note that his brother Sixte was a legitimist, who in scientific dissertation advanced rights of the Spanish Bourbons to the crown of France; on the other hand, his half-brother Élie openly abandoned the legitimist outlook. Some scholars claim that prince Xavier remained within "más pura doctrina tradicionalista"; others suggest that he nurtured democratic ideas.

Though his paternal uncle was until 1909 the legitimist claimant to the throne of Spain, succeeded by prince Xavier’s own cousin, prince Xavier – a Frenchman at heart – himself did not reveal any particular interest in Spanish issues, even though he maintained close links with his cousin, in the 1920s resident in Paris. This changed when Jaime III died unexpectedly in 1931 and was succeeded in his Carlist claim by Alfonso Carlos I. Resident in Vienna, octogenarian and childless, Alfonso Carlos was doubly related to the Bourbon-Parmas; the two families remained on close terms. His ascendance to the Carlist claim was from the onset plagued by the succession problem, as it was already evident that the Carlist dynasty would extinguish. As measure to address the issue, in the early 1930s Alfonso Carlos pondered upon reconciliation with the Alfonsine branch. It is not clear whether he commenced talks with other members of the family about a strictly Carlist succession in parallel, as option B, or whether he embarked on this course having abandoned the plans of dynastic agreement in 1934-1935.

Carlist standard

Following the death of Sixte in 1934 Xavier became the most senior Bourbon-Parma partner of Alfonso Carlos. The two must have discussed the question of Carlist succession extensively, yet there is no information on details. In particular, it is not clear whether Alfonso Carlos suggested that Xavier succeeds him as a king – proposal possibly rejected by the Bourbon-Parma, or whether regency was the option preferred from the onset. Scholars speculate that it was prince Xavier’s legitimism, Christian spirit, modesty, impartiality and lack of political ambitions which prompted Alfonso Carlos to appoint him as a future regent. What prompted Xavier to accept the proposal remains unclear. Some suspect that he gave in to the pressure of his uncle, and considered accepting the regency as his family, legitimist and Christian duty. In any case, Xavier probably viewed his future regency, announced in the Carlist press in April 1936 and to commence after death of Alfonso Carlos, in terms of months rather than years. It was supposed to provide royal continuity before a general Carlist assembly appoints a new king.

== Regent ==
=== Wartime leader (1936–1939) ===
Prince Xavier (right) with Alfonso Carlos

Contrary to expectations, the Spanish February 1936 elections produced victory of the Popular Front and the country embarked on a proto-revolutionary course. The Carlists first commenced preparations to their own rising, and then entered into negotiations with the conspiring military. For prince Xavier events took an unexpected turn. Instead of calmly familiarizing himself with the Spanish Carlists to organize smooth election of a new king following anticipated death of Alfonso Carlos, the latter asked him to supervise the conspiracy. Prince Xavier, in Spain known as Don Javier, set his headquarters in Sant-Jean-de-Luz and from June to July kept receiving Carlist politicians. In terms of negotiations with the generals, he adopted an orthodox Carlist, rigorous and intransigent stand. Though some Carlists pressed almost unconditional adherence to military conspiracy, Don Javier demanded that a partnership political deal is concluded first. He was eventually outmaneuvered and the Carlists joined the coup on vague terms; their key asset was the pre-agreed Jefe Supremo del Movimiento, General Sanjurjo, who in earlier Lisbon talks with Don Javier pledged to represent the Carlist interests.

The death of Sanjurjo was a devastating blow to Carlist plans; political power among the rebels slipped to a group of generals, indifferent if not skeptical about the Carlist cause. Don Javier, in the late summer watching the events unfold from Sant-Jean-de-Luz, was supervising increasing Carlist military effort, yet was unable to engage in discussion with the generals. Following the death of Alfonso Carlos on 1 October Don Javier was declared the regent. He found himself heading the movement during overwhelming turmoil. Denied entry to Spain, he limited himself to written protests over the marginalisation of Carlism within the Nationalist faction. Faced with growing pressure to integrate the Carlist organization within a new state party in early 1937, he advocated intransigence, but was again outmaneuvered into a silent wait-and-see stance. Following the Unification Decree he entered Spain in May; sporting a requeté general's uniform, and in apparent challenge to Franco he toured the front lines, lifting Carlist spirits. A week later he was expelled from Spain.

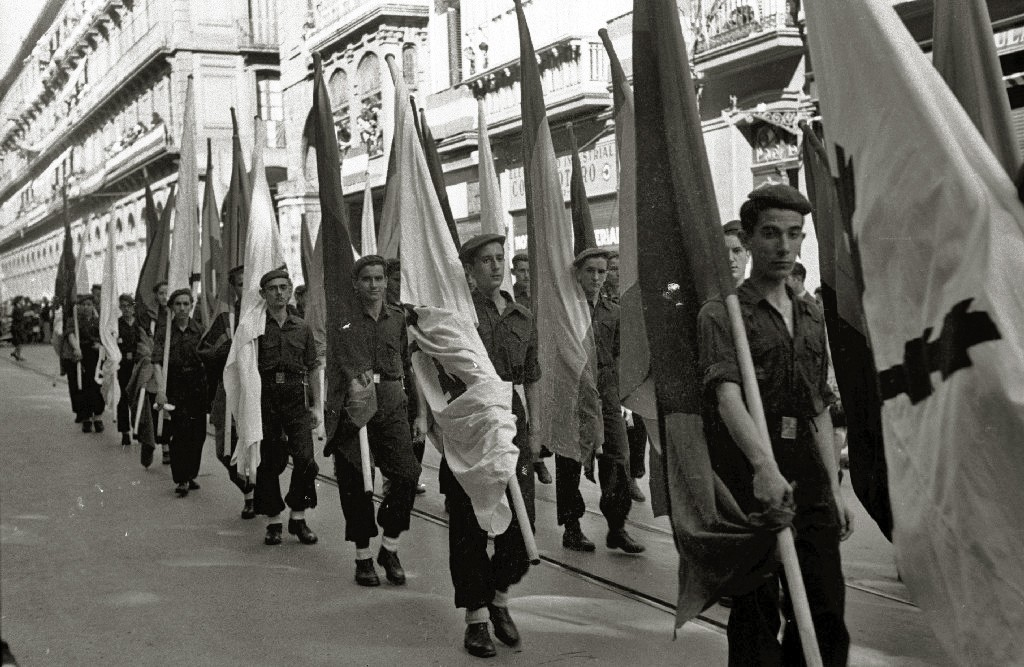
Requeté on parade, 1937

Following another brief visit and another expulsion in late 1937, Don Javier aimed at safeguarding Carlist political identity against the unification attempts, though he refrained also from burning all bridges with the emerging Francoist regime. He permitted few trusted Carlists to sit in the Falange Española Tradicionalista y de las Juntas de Ofensiva Nacional Sindicalista (FET y de las JONS) executive, but expelled from the Comunión Tradicionalista those who had taken seats without his consent. In full accord with the Carlist leader in Spain, Manuel Fal Conde, in 1938–1939 Don Javier managed to prevent incorporation into the state party, thus the intended unification turned into absorption of offshoot Carlists. On the other hand, Don Javier failed to prevent the marginalisation of Carlism, the suppression of its circulars, periodicals and organizations, and failed to avert growing bewilderment among rank and file Carlists. In 1939 he repeated his offer to Franco in Manifestación de ideales, a document was put forth recommending immediate restoration of Traditionalist monarchy with a transitory collective regency, possibly encompassing Don Javier and Franco. In historiography there are conflicting accounts of this episode, yet there was no follow-up on part of Franco.

=== Soldier, incommunicado, prisoner (1939–1945) ===
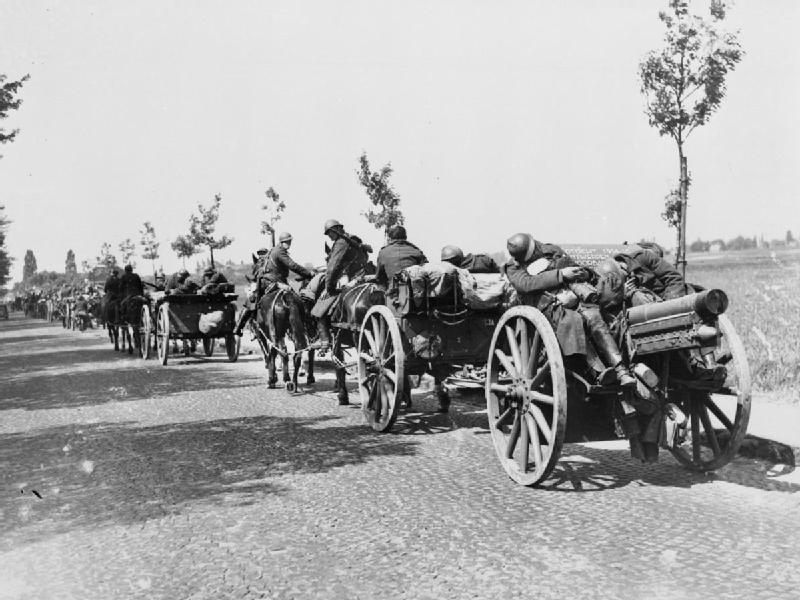
Belgian artillery, 1940.

Upon the outbreak of World War II Prince Xavier resumed his duties in the Belgian Army, serving as major in his old artillery unit. As the Germans advanced swiftly, the Belgians were pushed back to Flanders, towards the English Channel. Incorporated into the French troops, the regiment was withdrawn into Dunkerque. In the mayhem that followed, the Belgians did not make it to the British evacuation ships and Don Javier became a German POW. Released promptly, he returned to the family castles of Lignières in Berry and of Bostz, in Besson dans l’Allier. The properties were divided by the demarcation line, Lignières in the occupied zone and Bostz in the Vichy zone.

In late 1940 and early 1941, Prince Xavier assisted in opening the so-called "Halifax-Chevalier negotiations", a confidential correspondence exchange between the British Foreign Secretary and the Petain-government's education minister, centred mostly on working out a modus vivendi between the British and French colonies. The exact role of Prince Xavier is unclear. Some scholars claim he served as an intermediary, trusted by the British royal family, including King George VI, and by Pétain; as he did not leave France, it seems that he wrote letters which provided credibility for the envoys sent. Though the episode is subject to controversy, by some viewed as a proof of Pétain's double game and by some largely as a hagiographic mystification, the debate hardly relates to the role of Xavier.

In the early 1940s, Prince Xavier was increasingly isolated from Spanish affairs; neither he nor the Spanish Carlists were permitted to cross the frontier, while correspondence remained under wartime censorship. Documents he passed, the most notable of which was the Manifiesto de Santiago (1941), urged that intransigence, though not openly rebellious anti-Francoist actions, be maintained. With the regent, and periodically detained Fal, largely incommunicados, Carlism decayed into bewilderment and disorientation.

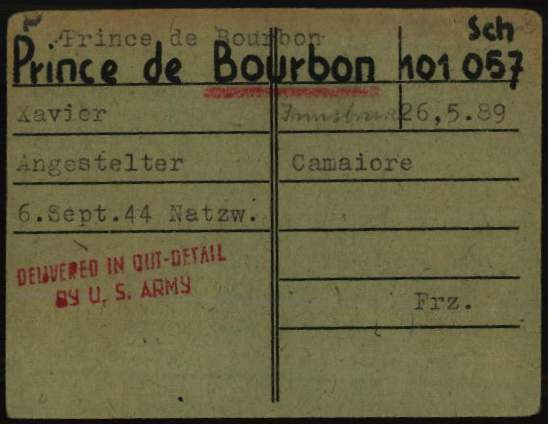
Prince Xavier's prisoner registry card at Dachau Nazi Concentration Camp.

In 1941–1943 Prince Xavier lived in political isolation, devoting time to his family and managing the Bourbon-Parma fortune. In 1941 he inherited from his late aunt the Puchheim castle in Austria. Prince Xavier became increasingly sympathetic to the anti-Pétain opposition and, via local priests, maintained informal contact with district Resistance leaders. At one point he joined works of the Comité d'Aide aux Réfractaires du STO and welcomed labor camp escapees in wooden areas of his estates, providing basic logistics and setting up shelters for the sick in his library. When two of them were detected and detained, Prince Xavier cycled to Vichy and successfully sought their release. Exposing himself, following a surveillance period in July he was arrested by the Gestapo. Sentenced to death for espionage and terrorism, he was pardoned by Pétain; first confined in Clermont-Ferrand, Schirmeck and Natzwiller, in September he was finally imprisoned in Dachau. The Nazis asked Franco about his fate; the Caudillo declared total disinterest. Periodically condemned to the starvation bunker, when freed by the Americans in April 1945, Prince Xavier weighed 36 kg.

=== Re-launch (1945–1952) ===
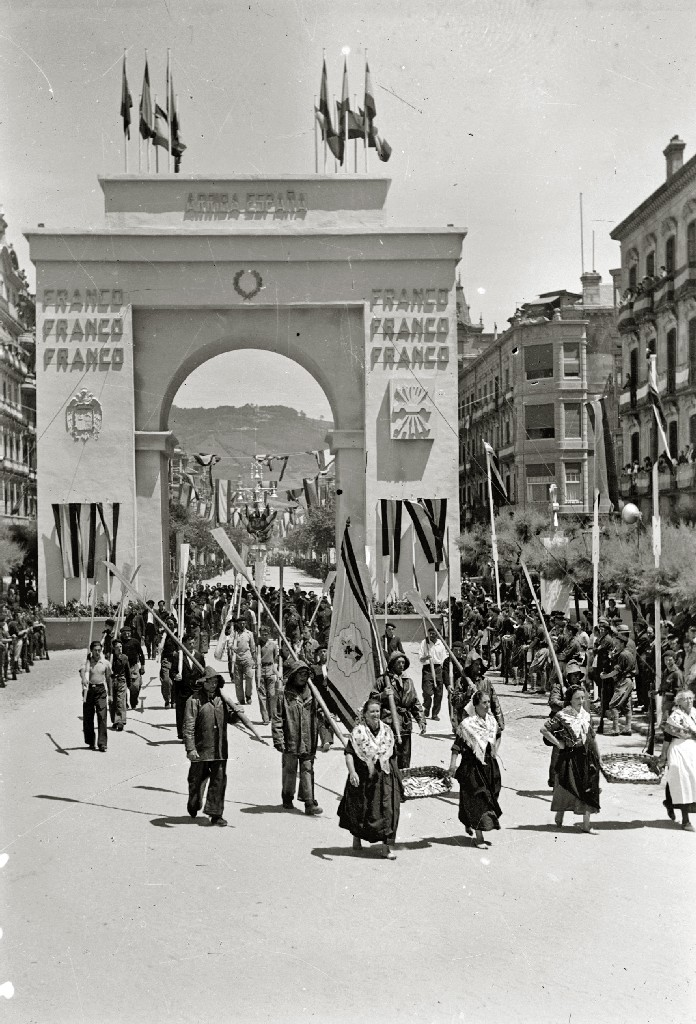
San Sebastián, early Francoism

Having returned to health, in late summer of 1945 prince Xavier testified at the trial of Pétain; his account was largely favorable for the marshal. In December he clandestinely entered Spain for a few days. In a series of meetings held mostly in San Sebastián, the regent and the Carlist executive agreed re-organisation basics of the Carlist structures. Don Javier fully confirmed the authority of Fal Conde and affirmed the intransigent political line, formulated in a 1947 document known as La única solución. It was based on non-collaborative though also non-rebellious stand versus Francoism, refusal to enter into dynastic negotiations with the Alfonsine branch, and hard line versus those who demonstrated excessive support for own Carlist royal candidates, even if theoretically they did not breach loyalty to Don Javier’s regency. With the rank and file Don Javier communicated by means of manifestos, read during Carlist feasts and urging loyalty to Traditionalist values. He also pretended to headship of the Borbon-Parmas.

In the late 1940s the policy of Don Javier and Fal Conde, dubbed javierismo or falcondismo, was increasingly contested within the Comunión. The Sivattistas pressed for terminating the regency and for Don Javier to declare himself the king. They suspected that the overdue regency was an element of Don Javier’s policy towards Franco; according to them, the regent intended to ensure the crown for the Bourbon-Parma by means of appeasement rather than by means of open challenge. In particular they were enraged by allegedly ambiguous stand versus the proposed Francoist Law of Succession, considering it an unacceptable backing of the regime. On the other hand, the possibilists were getting tired of what they perceived as ineffective intransigence and lack of legal outposts, recommending more flexible attitude. Especially following the 1949 news about Franco’s negotiations with Don Juan, Don Javier found himself under pressure to assume a more active stance.

Coat of Arms used as Claimant King of Spains by Xavier of Bourbon.

Don Javier and Fal stuck to rigorous discipline and dismissed Sivatte from Catalan jefatura, though they also tried to reinvigorate Carlism by permitting individual participation in local elections, seeking a national daily or building up student and workers’ organizations. However, gradually also Fal was getting convinced that the regency was a burden rather than an asset. There were almost no calls to terminate it as initially envisioned by Alfonso Carlos, i.e. by staging a grand Carlist assembly, and there are no signs that Don Javier contemplated such an option; almost all voices called for him simply to assume monarchic rights himself. During the 1950 tour across Vascongadas and 1951 one across Levante he still tried to maintain low profile, but in 1952 Don Javier decided to bow to the pressure, apparently against his own will and considering it another cross to bear. During the Eucharistic Congress in Barcelona he issued a number of documents, including a manifesto to his followers and a letter to his son; in vague terms they referred to "assumption of royalty in succession of the last king", though also to pending "promulgation at the nearest opportunity" and with no mention about the regency.

== King ==
=== Rather not a king (1952–1957) ===
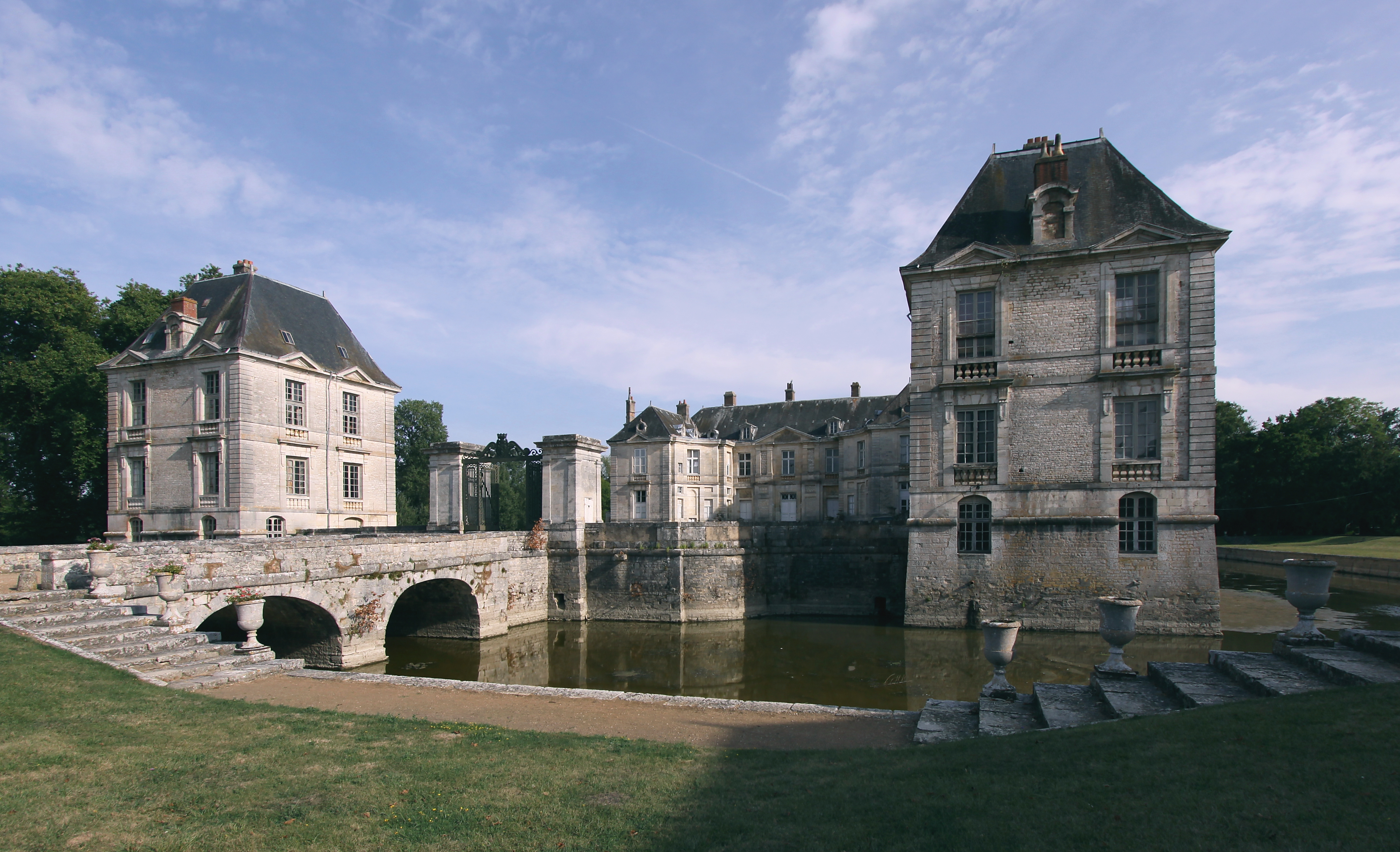
Lignières castle

The Carlist leaders were exhilarated and made sure that the Barcelona 1952 declaration, presented as end of the regency and commencing the rule of king Javier I, gets distributed across the party network; upon receiving the news, the rank and file got euphoric. However, the very next day Don Javier shared comments which put that understanding in doubt. When some time later approached by the Minister of Justice, he declared having signed no document and explained that his statement in no way implied he had proclaimed himself a king. These assurances did not work with the Francoist regime, and in a matter of hours Don Javier was promptly expelled from Spain.

The years of 1953–1954 provided a contrasting picture: the Carlist leaders boasted of having a new king, while Don Javier withdrew to Lignières, reducing his political activity to receiving guests and to correspondence. In private he played down what had already become known as "Acto de Barcelona", dubbing it "un toutté petite ceremonie". Carlist dissenters, temporarily silenced, started to be heard again. Don Javier seemed increasingly tired of his role and leaning towards a dynastical understanding with Don Juan. His brief early 1955 visit to Spain en route to Portugal fuelled angry rumors of forthcoming rapprochement with the Alfonsists as Don Javier made some ambiguous comments, named the 1952 statement "a grave error" and declared having been bullied into it. At this point relations between him and Fal reached the lowest point; Fal, attacked from all sides and feeling no royal support, resigned. According to some scholars, Don Javier sacked him in "a rather cowardly, backhand manner". Fal was soon replaced by a collegial executive. In late 1955 Don Javier issued a manifesto which declared the Carlists "custodians of patrimony" rather than political party seeking power and in private considered his royal claim a hindrance to alliance of all reasonable people. The year of 1956 proved convulsing, with a number of contradictory declarations following one another in circles; one episode cost Don Javier another expulsion from Spain.

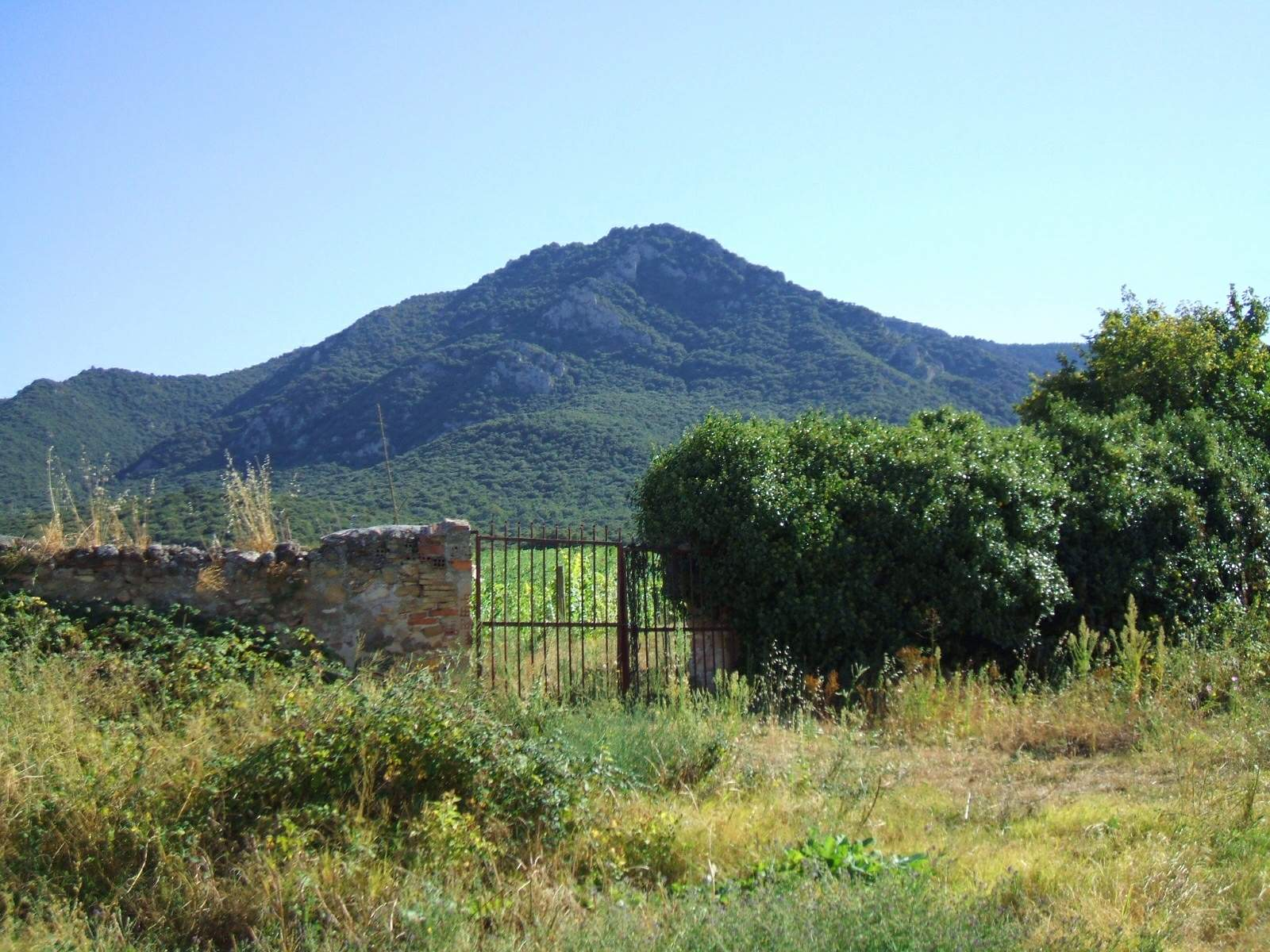
Montejurra

The apparent stalemate was interrupted by emergence of a new force. The young Carlists, disappointed with vacillating Don Javier, focused on his oldest son Hugues instead. Entirely alien to politics and at the time pursuing PhD in economics in Oxford, he agreed to throw himself into the Spanish affairs. Don Javier consented to his 1957 appearance on the annual Montejurra gathering, where the young prince, guided by his equally young aides, made explicit references to "my father, the king". As prince Hugues was ignorant as to Carlism and he barely spoke Spanish, it seems that his father has never considered him own successor, eager rather to free himself and the entire family from the increasingly heavy Carlist burden. It is not clear what he thought about his son unexpectedly engaging in Spanish politics; perhaps he felt relieved having found a replacement or support. To many, it seemed that he "had given up prevaricating".

=== Rather a king (1957–1962) ===
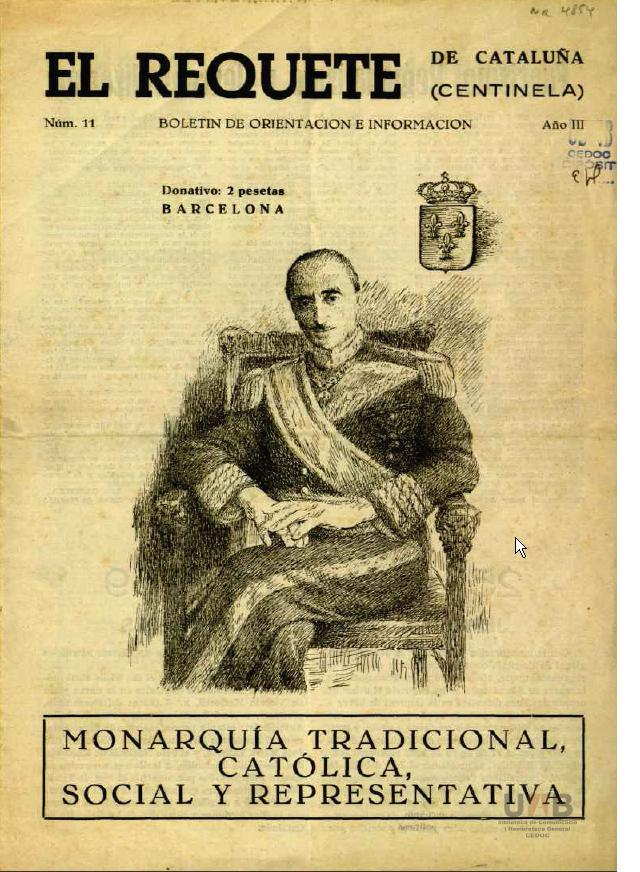
As king in Carlist review.

Under leadership of José María Valiente and with the consent of Don Javier, the collegial Carlist executive commenced cautious collaboration with the regime. The young entourage decided to introduce Hugues as representing a new strategy and presenting an offer to Franco. According to another interpretation, Don Javier saw his son's involvement as an opportunity to consider new strategies for long-term gains, and changed course in the hope that the regime might one day crown the younger prince. Still another view was that the changing political course and the political coming of age of Hugues simply coincided. One way or another, starting in 1957 Don Javier gradually permitted his son to assume an increasing role within Carlism.

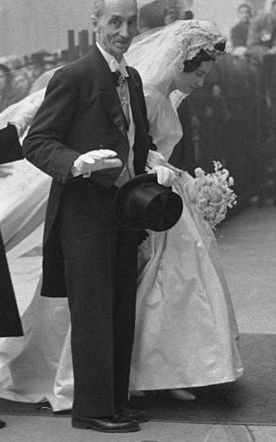
Prince Xavier at the wedding of his daughter Maria Francisca, Paris 1960.

In the late 1950s Don Javier firmly abandoned any discussion of reconciliation with the Alfonsinos. He instructed that harsh measures be taken against those who approached them. However, he remained respectful towards Don Juan and avoided open challenge, He also stopped short of explicitly claiming the kingly title. He supported Valiente – his position gradually reinforced formally up to the new Jefe Delegado in 1958–1960 – in attempts to eradicate internal forces of rebellion against collaboration, and to combat new openly secessionist groups. Though 20 years earlier he expelled from the Comunión those who had accepted seats in Francoist structures, at the beginning of the sixties Don Javier viewed the appointment of five Carlists to the Cortes as the success of the collaborationist policy, especially because the Franco regime permitted new Carlist legal outposts, and the movement participated openly in the public discourse.

Another milestone came in 1961–62. First, in a symbolic gesture Don Javier declared Hugues "Duque de San Jaime", a historic title borne by Alfonso Carlos; then, he instructed his followers to envision the prince as the embodiment of "a king". Hugues, legally renaming himself "Carlos Hugo", settled in Madrid and set up his Secretariat, a personal advisory body. Yet for the first time in history, a Carlist heir officially lived in the capital and openly pursued his own politics. From this moment onwards, Don Javier was increasingly perceived as ceding daily business to his son and merely providing general supervision from the back seat. Carlos Hugo gradually took control of communication channels with his father, replacing him also as a key representative of the House of Bourbon-Parma in Spain. Moreover, the three daughters of Don Javier, all in their 20s, with apparent consent of their father engaged themselves in campaigns intended to enhance the standing of their brother with the Spanish public; the younger son of Don Javier, Sixte, soon followed suit.

=== King, the father (1962–1969) ===
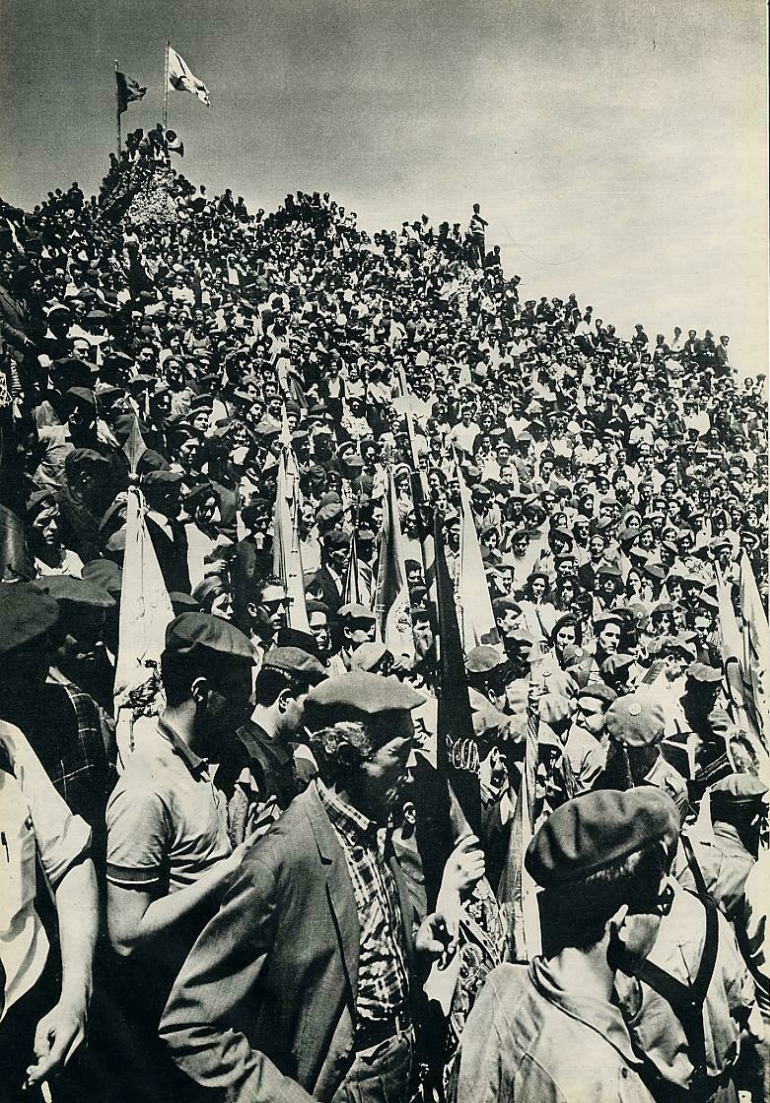
Montejurra, 1960s

Carlos Hugo and his aides embarked on an activist policy, launching new initiatives and ensuring that the young prince gets increasingly recognized in national media. In terms of political content the group started to advance heterodox theories, focused on society as means and objective of politics. In terms of strategy, until the mid-1960s it was formatted as advances towards the socially-minded, hard Falangist core; later it started to assume an increasingly Marxist flavor. Orthodox Traditionalists grew increasingly perturbed by Carlos Hugo's active political advances toward the socially-minded, hard Falangist core, which assumed an increasingly Marxist flavor. They tried to alert Don Javier. However, Don Javier gave them repeated assurances that he maintained full confidence in Carlos Hugo. In 1967 Don Javier confirmed that nothing need be added to the Carlist dogma of "Dios, Patria, Fueros, Rey". Yet he also affirmed that new times required new practical concepts. He endorsed subsequent waves of structural changes, and declared some personal decisions. By the mid-1960s Don Javier allowed the Comunión in Carlos Hugo's control and that of his supporters. In the so-called Acto de Puchheim of 1965, for the first time Don Javier explicitly called himself "rey", and consistently claimed that title henceforth.

Such writers as Josep Carlos Clemente and Fermín Pérez-Nievas Borderas maintain that Don Javier was fully aware and entirely supportive of the transformation of Carlism triggered by Carlos Hugo, helped among others by Artur Juncosa Carbonell, intended as renovation of genuine Carlist thought and as shaking off Traditionalist distortions.

Another group of scholars claim that the aging Don Javier, at that time in his late 70s, was increasingly detached from Spanish issues and substantially unaware of the political course sponsored by Carlos Hugo. They argue that he was, perhaps, manipulated – and at later stages even incapacitated – by his son and two daughters, who intercepted incoming correspondence and re-edited their father's outgoing communications.

Another group of scholars largely refrain from interpretation, confining itself to referring readers to correspondence, declarations and statements.

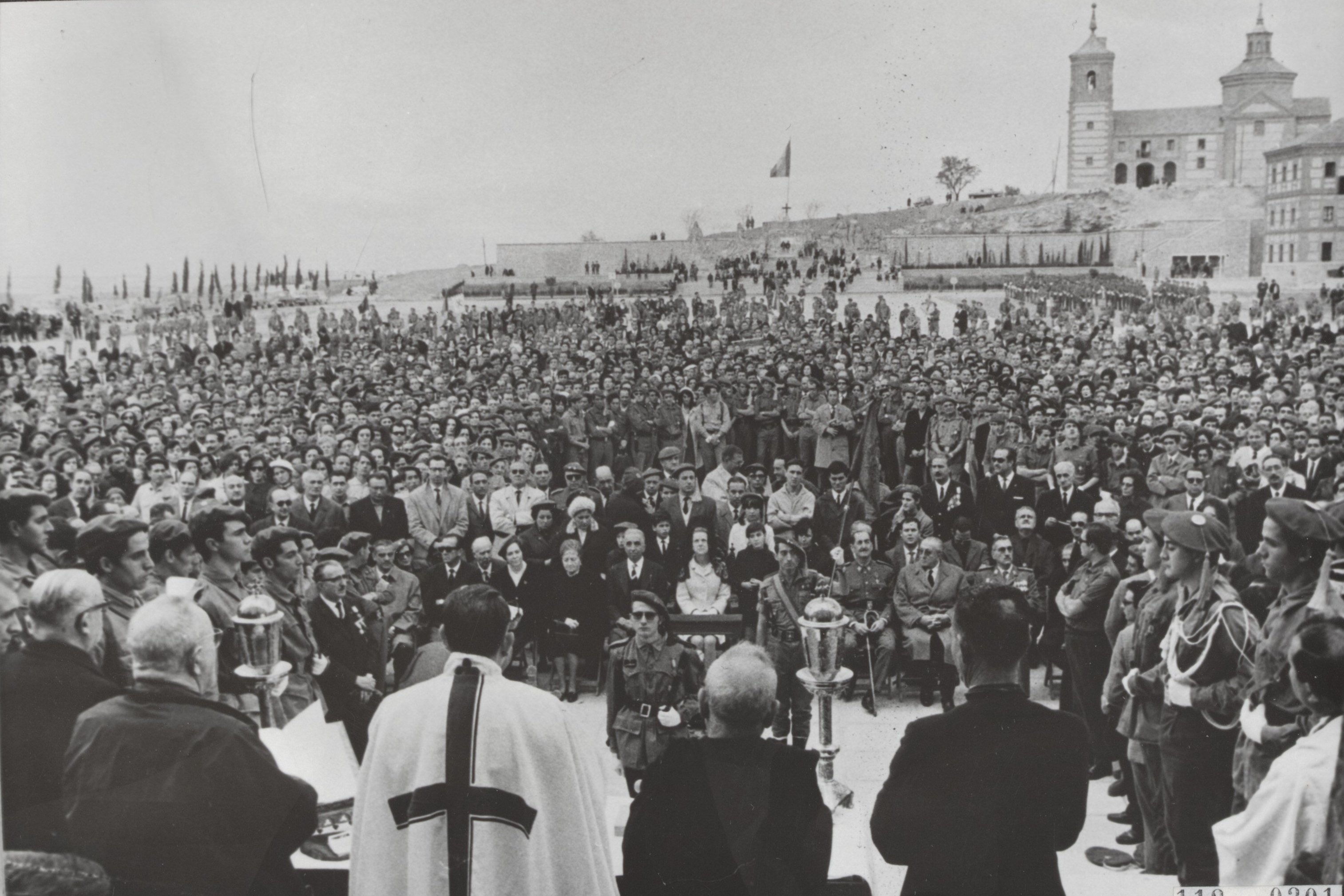
Carlist gathering, near Madrid 1960s

As late as 1966 Don Javier continue to court Franco, but the years of 1967–1969 re-defined his relation with Carlism and with Spain. In 1967 he accepted the resignation of Valiente, the last Traditionalist bulwark in the executive, and entrusted political leadership of the Comunión to a set of collegial bodies dominated by hugocarlistas; the move marked their final victory in the struggle to control the organization.

In 1968 Carlos Hugo was expelled from Spain; In a gesture of support, a few days later Don Javier flew to Madrid and was promptly expelled – for the fifth time. This episode marked the end of an increasingly sour dialogue with the regime and the Carlist shift to unconditional opposition;

In 1969 the Alfonsist prince Juan Carlos de Borbón was officially introduced as the future king and successor to Franco, with the title Prince of Spain; the ceremony marked the ultimate crash of the Bourbon-Parmas' hopes for the crown. When Franco died in 1975, Juan Carlos did indeed become king of Spain.

=== Old king, former king (1969–1977) ===
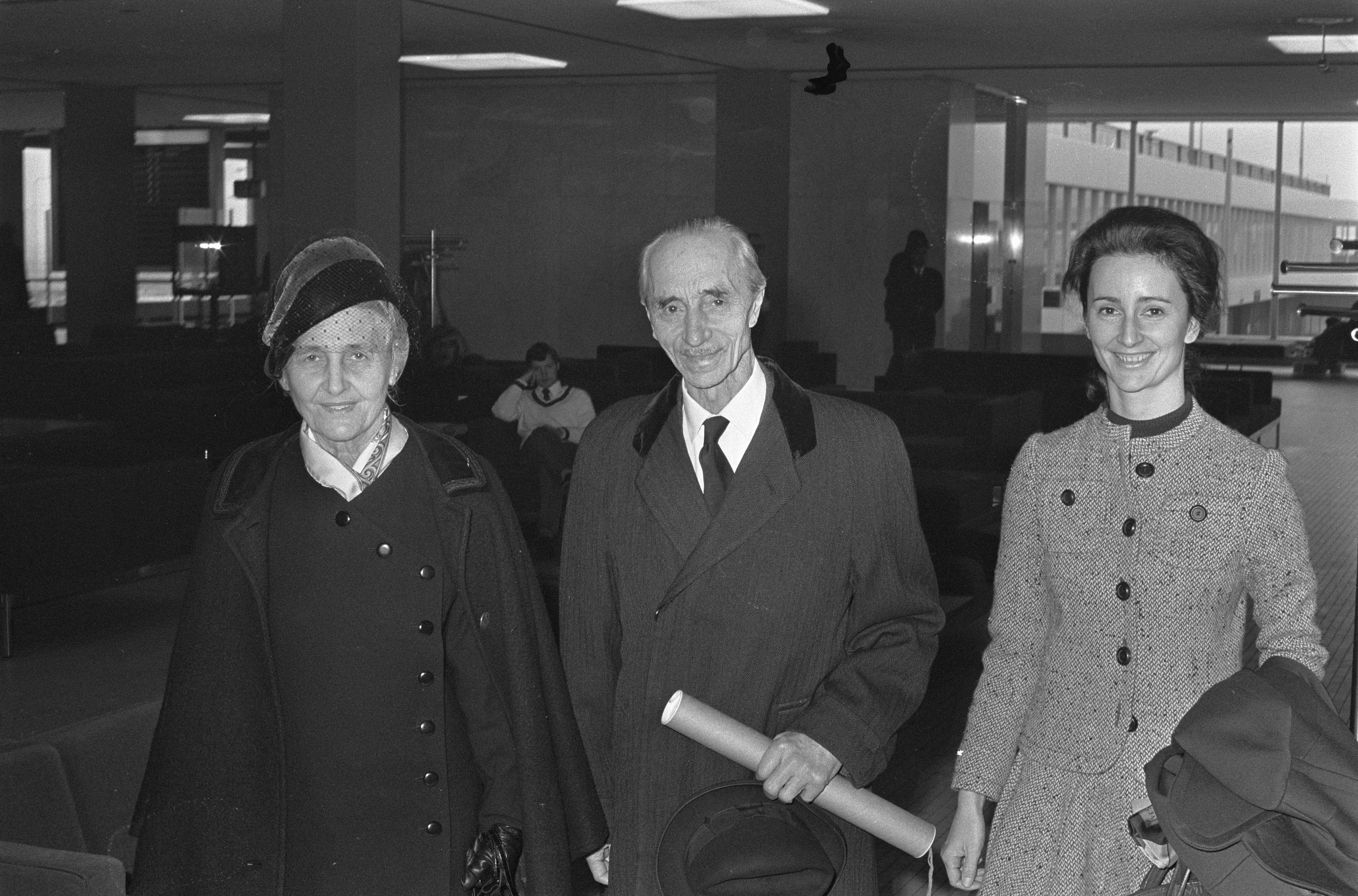
With wife and daughter Maria de las Nieves, 1970.

Resident mostly at Lignières, Don Javier withdrew, issuing sporadic manifestos, read by his son at Carlist gatherings.

In 1972 Don Javier suffered life-threatening injuries resulting from a traffic accident and formally transferred all political authority to Carlos Hugo. In 1974, upon the childless death of his half-nephew Prince Robert, Duke of Parma, Don Javier ascended as head of the Bourbon-Parmas and assumed the Duke of Parma title. On the one hand, he was in a position to enjoy family life; though his four younger children did not marry, the elder two did, the marriages producing eight grandchildren (born between 1960 and 1974). On the other hand, family relations were increasingly subject to political tension. While Carlos Hugo, Marie-Thérèse, Cécile and Marie des Neiges formed one team advancing the progressive agenda, the oldest daughter Françoise Marie, the youngest son Sixte, and their mother Madeleine opposed the bid. Sixte, in Spain known as Don Sixto, openly challenged his brother; he declared himself the standard-bearer of Traditionalism and started building his own organization.

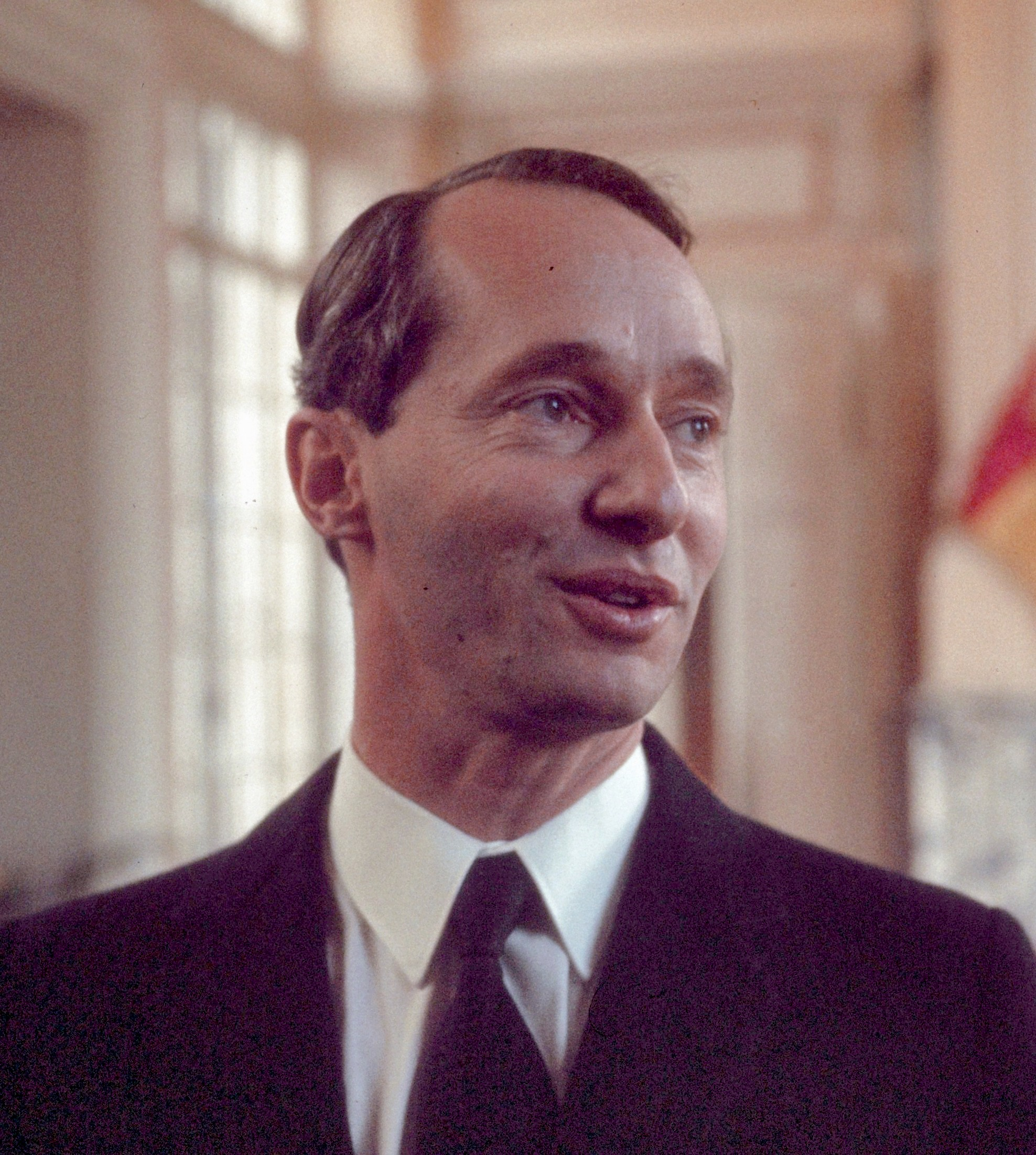
Carlos Hugo, 1970s.

In 1975 Don Javier abdicated as the Carlist king in favor of Carlos Hugo and according to a source, he would have expelled Sixto from Carlism for refusing to recognize the decision. It is not clear what his view on the commencing Spanish transición was; following the 1976 Montejurra events he lamented the dead, officially disowned the political views of Don Sixto and called for Carlist unity. However, in a private letter, Don Javier claimed that at Montejurra "the Carlists have confronted the revolutionaries", which has been interpreted as the followers of Don Sixto being the real Carlists according to Don Javier.

Early March 1977 proved convulsive. On Friday 4th, accompanied by his son Sixto, he was interviewed by the Spanish press and his responses showed Carlist orthodoxy. That same day he issued a declaration certified by a Paris notary objecting to his name being used to legitimize a "grave doctrinal error within Carlism", and implicitly disowned the political line promoted by Carlos Hugo. In order to justify that declaration, Carlos Hugo alerted the police that his father had been abducted by Sixto, an accusation which was denied publicly by Don Javier himself, who had to be hospitalized heavily affected by the scandal generated. Shortly afterwards Don Javier issued another declaration, certified by a different Paris notary, confirming his oldest son as "my only political successor and head of Carlism". Then it was Doña Madalena who declared that her husband had been taken by Carlos Hugo from hospital against medical advice and his own will, and that Carlos Hugo had threatened his father to obtain his signature on the second declaration. Eventually Don Javier was transferred to Switzerland, where he soon died. The widow blamed the oldest son and three daughters for his death.

== Reception and legacy ==
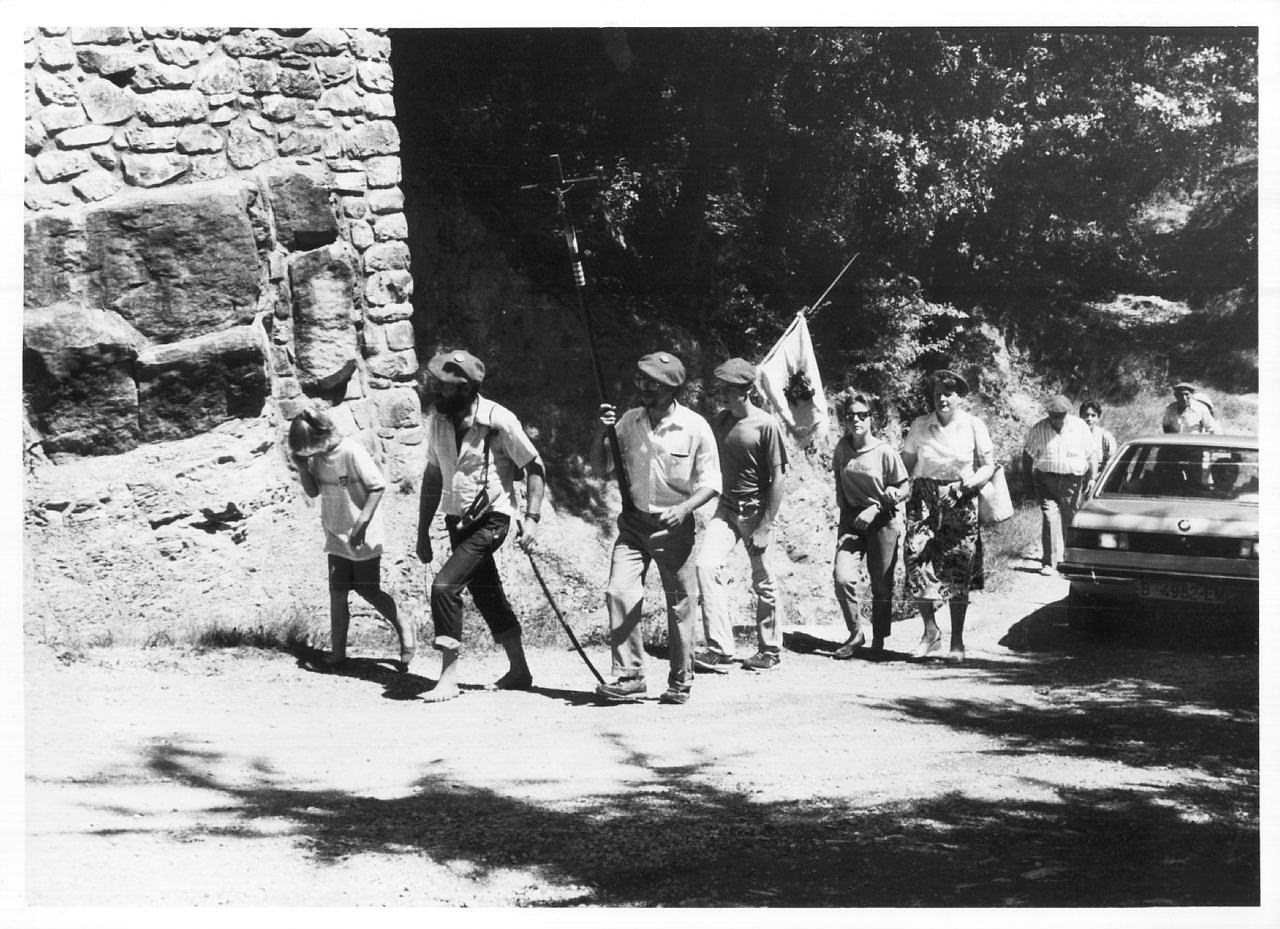
Carlists, 1980s

Barely noted in Spain until the Civil War, also afterwards Don Javier remained a little known figure, partially the result of censorship; Franco considered him a foreign prince. Among European royals he was respected but politically isolated. In the Carlist realm he grew from obscurity to iconic status, yet since the late 1950s he was being abandoned by successive groups, disappointed with his policy. Disintegration of Carlism accelerated after Don Javier's death; Partido Carlista won no seats in general elections and in 1979 Carlos Hugo abandoned politics. This was also the case of his three sisters, though Marie Therese became a scholar in political sciences and advisor to Third World politicians. Sixte is heading Comunión Tradicionalista, one of two Traditionalist grouplets in Spain, and poses as a Carlist standard-bearer. The oldest living grandson of Don Javier, Charles-Xavier, styles himself as the head of the Carlist dynasty, oddly enough, without claiming the Spanish throne. In France a grouplet referred to as Lys Noir called him in 2015 a "king of France for tomorrow". The group is classified by some as Far Right and by some associated with Trotsky, Mao and Gaddafi.

In partisan discourse Don Javier is generally held in high esteem, though Left-wing Partido Carlista militants and Right-wing Traditionalists offer strikingly different pictures of him. Authors admitting their Hugocarlista pedigree claim that from his youth Don Javier has nurtured democratic, progressive ideas, and in the 1960s he lent his full support to renovation of Carlist thought. Authors remaining within the Traditionalist orthodoxy suggest that although generally conservative, but in his 70s impaired by age, bewildered by Vatican II, misled and possibly incapacitated by his children, Don Javier presided over destruction of Carlism. A few go farther, claiming that evidence points to Don Javier having been fully supportive of the course sponsored by his son, they either talk about "deserción de la dinastía" or – with some hesitation – point to treason. Some, highly respectful though disappointed by Don Javier's perceived ineptitude and vacillation as a leader, consider him a candidate for sainthood rather than for kingship.

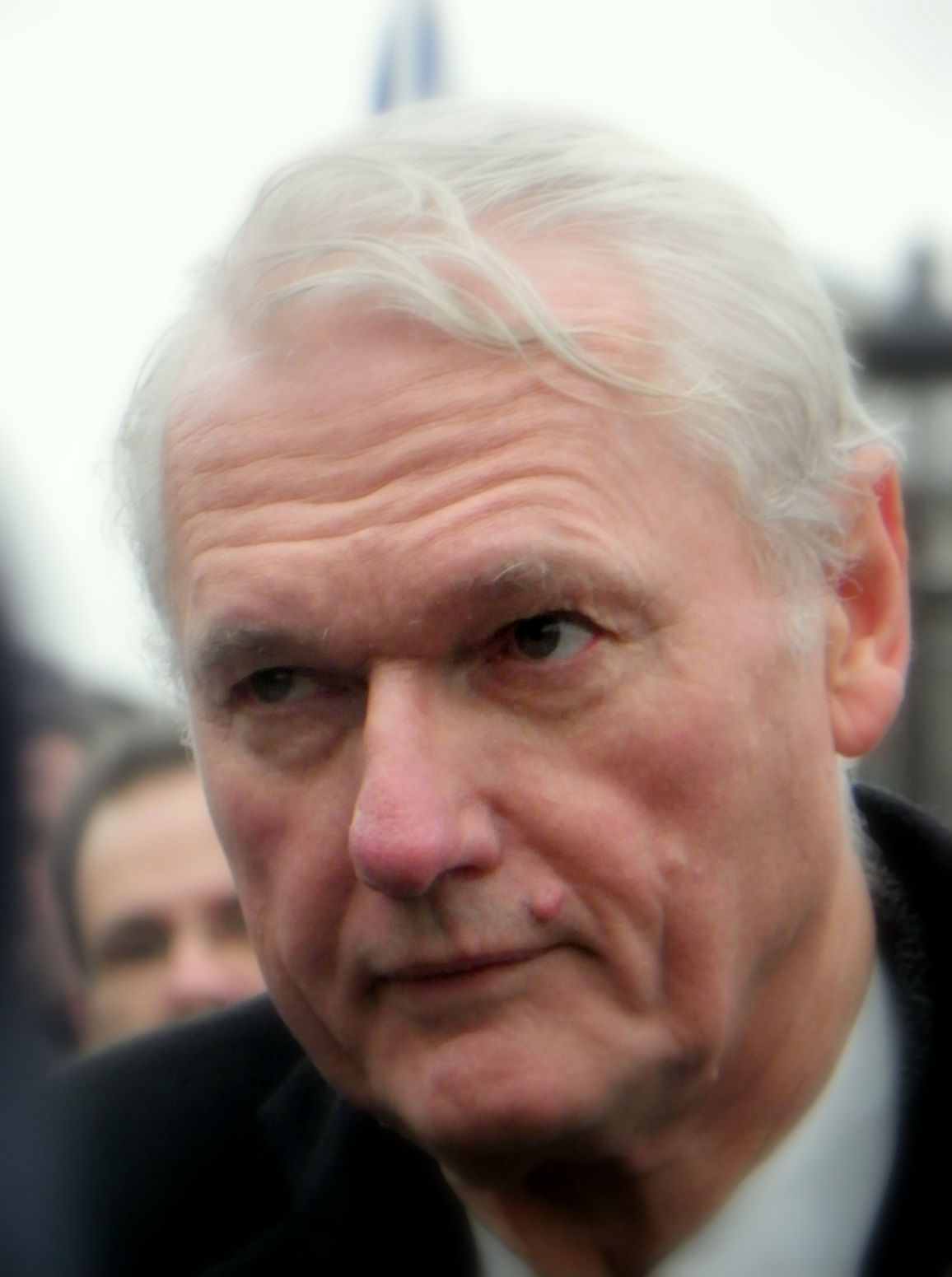
Sixto Enrique, 2014

In historiography Prince Xavier has earned no academic monograph yet; books published fall rather into hagiography. Apart from minor pieces related to the Sixtus Affair, Chambord litigation and Halifax-Chevalier negotiations, he is discussed as a key protagonist in various works dealing with Carlism during the Francoist era. There are four PhD dissertations discussing post-civil-war Carlism, yet they offer contradictory conclusions. One presents Don Javier as a somewhat wavering person who eventually endorsed changes to be introduced by Carlos Hugo. One carefully notes his "peculiar position" yet it cautiously claims he kept backing the transformation. Two point to his "contradictory personality" and admit that his stand "might seem confusing", though they claim that he was generally conservative and was faithful to Traditionalist principles, Don Javier was misguided and manipulated, inadvertently legitimizing the change he did not genuinely support. Some hints suggest that he never seriously contemplated his own royal bid, and headed Carlism as a cultural-spiritual movement, perhaps modelled on French legitimism.

At least since 1957 Don Javier purported to exercise the kingly prerogative as a fount of honour, occasionally conferring Carlist chivalric orders, such as the Legitimidad Proscrita, upon Valiente, Fal and Zamanillo; in 1963 he conferred the Gran Cruz of the same order on his wife. Don Javier has also created and conferred a number of aristocratic titles, but with one exception (Fal Conde) only for members of his family: Duque de Madrid and Duque de San Jaime for Don Carlos Hugo; Condesa de Poblet for Doña Cecilia; Condesa del Castillo de la Mota for Doña María de las Nieves; Duque de Aranjuez for Don Sixto.

== Children ==
- Princess Marie Françoise of Bourbon-Parma, born on 19 August 1928 (age 98), married Prince Edouard de Lobkowicz (1926–2010) and had issue.
- Carlos Hugo, Duke of Parma, 8 April 1930 – 18 August 2010 (aged 80), married Princess Irene of the Netherlands (born 1939) and had issue.
- Princess Marie Thérèse of Bourbon-Parma, 28 July 1933 – 26 March 2020 (aged 86). Victim of COVID-19.
- Princess Cécile Marie of Bourbon-Parma, 12 April 1935 – 1 September 2021 (aged 86).
- Princess Marie des Neiges of Bourbon-Parma, born on 29 April 1937 (age 89).
- Prince Sixtus Henry of Bourbon-Parma, born on 22 July 1940 (age 86).

== In fiction ==
The television series The Young Indiana Jones Chronicles presents Xavier (played by Matthew Wait) and his brother Sixtus (played by Benedict Taylor) as Belgian officers in World War I who help the young Indiana Jones.

== Writings ==
- La République de tout le monde, Paris: Amicitia, 1946
- Les accords secrets franco-anglais de décembre 1940, Paris: Plon, 1949.
- Les chevaliers du Saint-Sépulcre, Paris: A. Fayard, 1957.

== Honours ==
- (Kingdom of the Two Sicilies) Calabrian House of Bourbon-Two Sicilies Knight Grand Cross of Justice of the Calabrian Two Sicilian Order of Saint George
- Belgium: Knight Grand Cordon of the Order of Leopold
- Belgium: Croix de Guerre
- France: Croix de Guerre
- (Duchy of Parma) : Sovereign Knight of the Order of Prohibited Legitimacy

== Ancestry ==
Ancestors of Prince Xavier of Bourbon-Parma

16. Louis I of Etruria
8. Charles II, Duke of Parma
17. Maria Luisa, Duchess of Lucca
4. Charles III, Duke of Parma
18. Victor Emmanuel I of Sardinia
9. Princess Maria Teresa of Savoy
19. Archduchess Maria Theresa of Austria-Este
2. Robert I, Duke of Parma
20. Charles X of France
10. Prince Charles Ferdinand, Duke of Berry
21. Princess Maria Teresa of Savoy
5. Princess Louise of Artois
22. Francis I of the Two Sicilies
11. Princess Marie Caroline of Naples and Sicily
23. Archduchess Maria Clementina of Austria
1. Xavier, Duke of Parma
24. Peter III of Portugal
12. John VI of Portugal and Brazil
25. Maria I of Portugal and Brazil
6. Miguel I of Portugal
26. Charles IV of Spain
13. Infanta Carlota Joaquina of Spain
27. Princess Maria Luisa of Parma
3. Infanta Maria Antonia of Portugal
28. Charles Thomas, Prince of Löwenstein
14. Constantine, Hereditary Prince of Löwenstein
29. Countess Sophie of Windisch-Graetz
7. Princess Adelaide of Löwenstein
30. Karl Ludwig, Prince of Hohenlohe-Langenburg
15. Princess Agnes of Hohenlohe-Langenburg
31. Countess Amalie Henriette of Solms-Baruth

== See also ==
- Carlism
- Traditionalism (Spain)
- House of Bourbon-Parma
- Robert I of Parma
- Prince Carlos Hugo, Duke of Parma
- Prince Sixtus Henry of Bourbon-Parma

== Footnotes ==
Prince Xavier of Bourbon-Parma House of Bourbon-Parma Cadet branch of the House of Bourbon Born: 25 May 1889 Died: 7 May 1977
Titles in pretence
Preceded by Robert Hugo, Duke of Parma	— TITULAR — Duke of Parma; 1974–1977; Reason for succession failure: Annexed by Kingdom of Italy	Succeeded by Carlos Hugo, Duke of Parma
Preceded by Infante Alfonso Carlos, Duke of San Jaime	— TITULAR — King of Spain; Carlist claimant 1936–1952 as regent 1952–1975 as pretender	Succeeded by Carlos Hugo, Duke of Parma
