= Besson, Allier =

Besson
- Commune
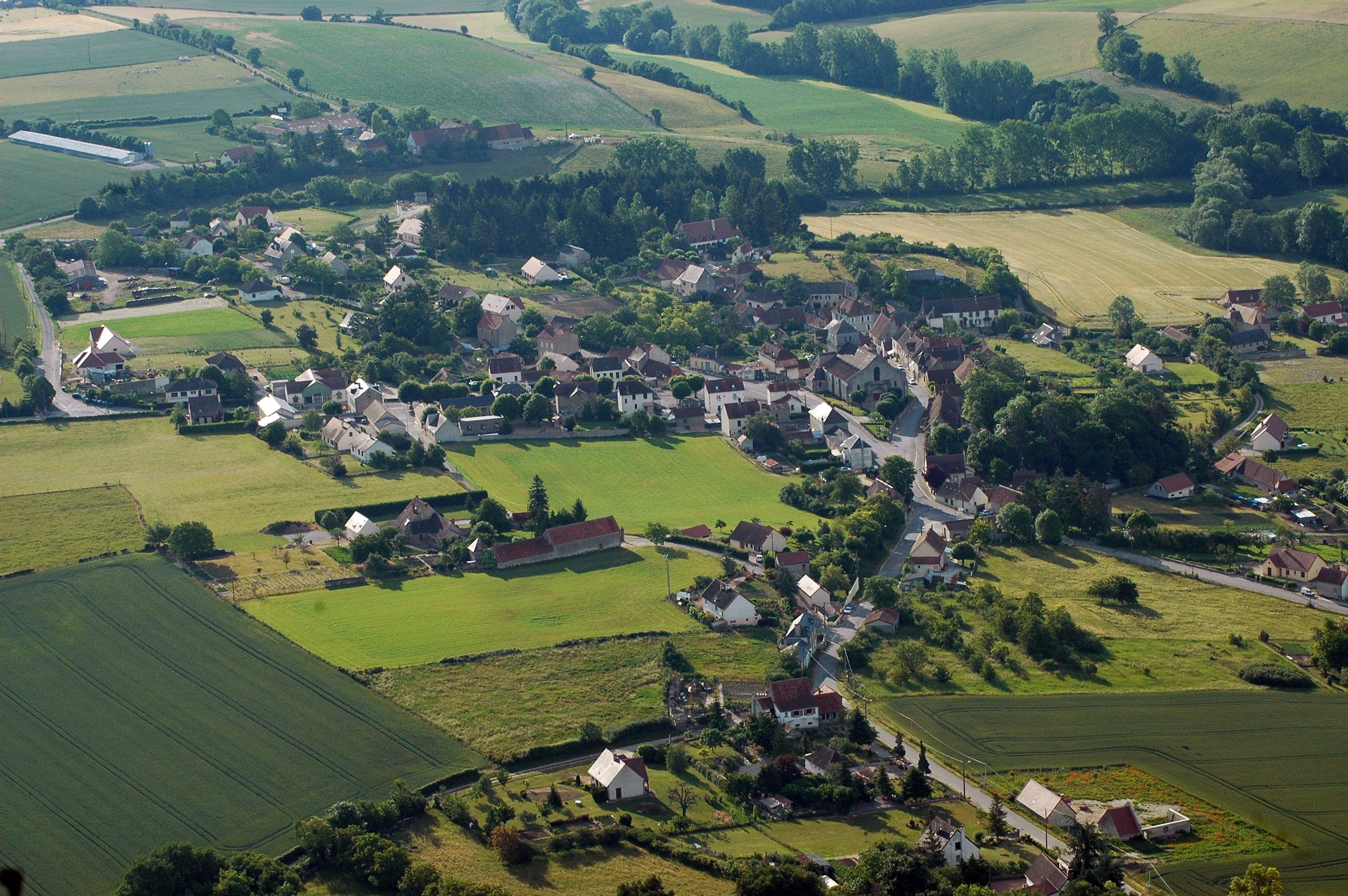
- An aerial view of Besson

- Coat of arms
- Location of Besson
- Location within France Location within Auvergne-Rhône-Alpes
- Coordinates: 46°28′15″N 3°15′53″E
- Country: France
- Region: Auvergne-Rhône-Alpes
- Department: Allier
- Arrondissement: Moulins
- Canton: Souvigny
- Intercommunality: CA Moulins Communauté

Government
  - Mayor (2026–32): Frédéric Verdier
- Area^{1}: 47.16 km^{2} (18.21 sq mi)
- Elevation: 250 m (820 ft)
- Highest elevation: 350 m (1,150 ft)
- Lowest elevation: 224 m (735 ft)
- Population (2023): 728
  - Density: 15.4/km^{2} (40.0/sq mi)
- Time zone: UTC+01:00 (CET)
  - Summer (DST): UTC+02:00 (CEST)
- INSEE/Postal code: 03026 /03210
- ^{1} French Land Register data, which excludes lakes, ponds, glaciers > 1 km^{2} (0.386 sq mi or 247 acres) and river estuaries.

Besson (French pronunciation: [bɛsɔ̃]) is a commune in the Allier department in central France.

== Population ==
Historical population
Year	Pop.	±% p.a.
1968	817	—
1975	815	−0.04%
1982	733	−1.50%
1990	786	+0.88%
1999	775	−0.16%
2007	795	+0.32%
2012	783	−0.30%
2017	768	−0.39%
2023	728	−0.89%
Source: INSEE

== Administration ==
- 2001–2014: Jean Pagnon
- 2014–current: Frédéric Verdier

== See also ==
- Communes of the Allier department
