= 1199 =

1199 in various calendars
- Gregorian calendar: 1199; MCXCIX
- Ab urbe condita: 1952
- Armenian calendar: 648; ԹՎ ՈԽԸ
- Assyrian calendar: 5949
- Balinese saka calendar: 1120–1121
- Bengali calendar: 605–606
- Berber calendar: 2149
- English Regnal year: 10 Ric. 1 – 1 Joh. 1
- Buddhist calendar: 1743
- Burmese calendar: 561
- Byzantine calendar: 6707–6708
- Chinese calendar: 戊午年 (Earth Horse); 3896 or 3689 — to — 己未年 (Earth Goat); 3897 or 3690
- Coptic calendar: 915–916
- Discordian calendar: 2365
- Ethiopian calendar: 1191–1192
- Hebrew calendar: 4959–4960
- Hindu calendars
- Vikram Samvat: 1255–1256
- Shaka Samvat: 1120–1121
- Kali Yuga: 4299–4300
- Holocene calendar: 11199
- Igbo calendar: 199–200
- Iranian calendar: 577–578
- Islamic calendar: 595–596
- Japanese calendar: Kenkyū 10 / Shōji 1 (正治元年)
- Javanese calendar: 1107–1108
- Julian calendar: 1199; MCXCIX
- Korean calendar: 3532
- Minguo calendar: 713 before ROC 民前713年
- Nanakshahi calendar: −269
- Seleucid era: 1510/1511 AG
- Thai solar calendar: 1741–1742
- Tibetan calendar: ས་ཕོ་རྟ་ལོ་ (male Earth-Horse); 1325 or 944 or 172 — to — ས་མོ་ལུག་ལོ་ (female Earth-Sheep); 1326 or 945 or 173

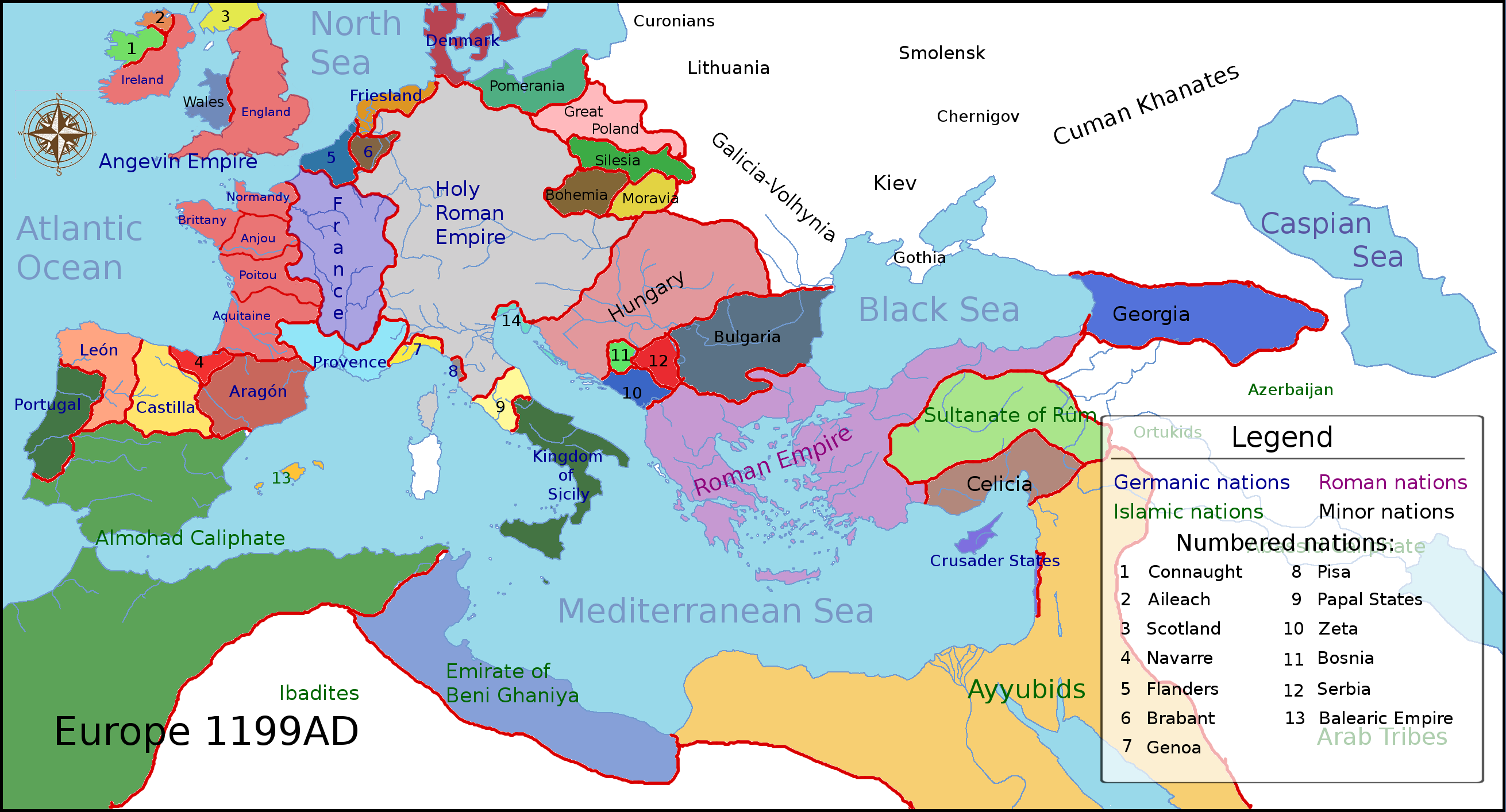

Year 1199 (MCXCIX) was a common year starting on Friday of the Julian calendar.

== Events ==
=== By place ===
==== Europe ====
- January 13 – A short-lived truce is declared, between the Kings Richard I (the Lionheart) and Philip II (Augustus). Two of Europe's most powerful rulers meet on the banks of the Seine River, while shouting terms to one another. With a peace secured, Richard is able to refocus on bringing internal order to the south of the Angevin Empire.
- March 26 – Richard I besieges the unarmed castle of Châlus-Chabrol, and is shot in the left shoulder with a crossbow, by the French boy Pierre Basile. The war between the kingdoms of England and France has become so brutal, that Hugh of Lincoln is warned that "nothing now is safe, neither the city to dwell in nor the highway for travel".
- April 6 – Richard I dies from gangrene, caused by his crossbow wound. His younger brother, John (Lackland), becomes King of England. Richard's jewels are left to his nephew, Otto IV, King of the Romans. Mercadier, a mercenary captain and Richard's second in command, has Pierre Basile flayed alive and hanged.
- Roman Mstislavich (the Great), Grand Prince of Vladimir-Volhynia, unites his realm with its westerly neighbor Galicia (after the death of Vladimir II). He makes the Kingdom of Galicia-Volhynia more powerful than Kiev.
- Summer – Philip II renews his war against England, supporting the rival claim to the English throne of John's 12-year-old nephew Arthur I, duke of Brittany.
- Summer – After uncovering a plot against him, Emeric, King of Hungary defeats his brother Duke Andrew in a battle, forcing him into exile in Austria. Thereafter, border clashes occurs between Hungary and Austria.

==== Britain ====
- May 26 – John returns to London and chooses people to help him to rule the kingdom. He appoints Archbishop Hubert Walter as his advisor and chancellor. Geoffrey Fitz Peter is chosen as Chief Justiciar and William (the Marshal) becomes Marshal of John's household. On May 27, John is crowned as king of England at Westminster Abbey.
- Summer – King William the Lion of Scotland supports John's claim to the English throne, in exchange for ownership of the northern territories (including Northumberland and Cumberland).

==== Africa ====
- January 23 – Caliph Abu Yusuf Yaqub al-Mansur dies at Marrakesh after a 15-year reign in which he has defeated the Castilian forces of King Alfonso VIII (the noble) (see 1195) and other Christian enemies in Al-Andalus. He is succeeded by his son Muhammad al-Nasir as ruler of the Almohad Caliphate (until 1213).

==== Japan ====
- February 9 – Minamoto no Yoritomo, Japanese shogun, dies at Kamakura after a 7-year reign in which he has established the Kamakura shogunate (see 1192). He is succeeded by his 16-year-old son Minamoto no Yoriie, his grandfather Hōjō Tokimasa proclaims himself regent for Yoriie (until 1202).

=== By topic ===
==== Religion ====
- Summer – Pope Innocent III calls for a fourth Crusade at Rome. Due to the preaching of Fulk of Neuilly, an army is organized at a tournament held at Ecry-sur-Aisne by Theobald III, count of Champagne, on November 28.
- St. Laurence's Church, Ludlow, in England is rebuilt.

== Births ==
- April 17 – Marie of Ponthieu, French noblewoman (d. 1250)
- Aisha Al-Manoubya, Almohad female Sufi mystic (d. 1267)
- Al-Mansur al-Hasan, Yemeni imam and politician (d. 1271)
- Bohemond V, prince of Antioch (House of Poitiers) (d. 1252)
- Ferdinand III (the Saint), king of Castile and León (d. 1252)
- Guttorm of Norway (Sigurdsson), king of Norway (d. 1204)
- Ibn al-Abbar, Andalusian biographer and historian (d. 1260)
- Isobel of Huntingdon, daughter of David of Scotland (d. 1252)
- Jalal al-Din Mangburni, Khwarezmid ruler (shah) (d. 1231)
- Joan of Constantinople, Flemish noblewoman (d. 1244)
- Sturla Sighvatsson, Icelandic chieftain (or goði) (d. 1238)
- Thomas II, Flemish nobleman (House of Savoy) (d. 1259)

== Deaths ==
- January 23 – Abu Yusuf Yaqub al-Mansur, Almohad caliph (b. 1160)
- February 9 – Minamoto no Yoritomo, Japanese shogun (b. 1147)
- February 13 – Stefan Nemanja, Serbian Grand Prince (b. 1113)
- March 17 – Jocelin of Glasgow (or Jocelyn), Scottish bishop
- April 5 – Ashikaga Yoshikane, Japanese samurai and monk
- April 6
  - Pierre Basile (or Bertran de Gurdun), French knight
  - Richard I (the Lionheart), king of England (b. 1157)
- July 10 – Hugh de Roxburgh (or Hugo), Scottish bishop
- August 20 – Matthew, Scottish churchman and bishop
- September 4 – Joan of England, queen of Sicily (b. 1165)
- October 9 – Bobo of San Teodoro, Italian cardinal-deacon
- November 6 – Hatim ibn Ibrahim, Yemeni religious leader
- November 25 – Albert III (the Rich), count of Habsburg
- December 25 – Helena of Hungary, duchess of Austria
- Alexios Komnenos, son of Andronikos I (Komnenos)
- Azalais of Toulouse (or Adelaide), French noblewoman
- Benedicta Ebbesdotter of Hvide, queen of Sweden (or 1200)
- Date Tomomune, Japanese nobleman and samurai (b. 1129)
- Michael the Syrian (the Great), Syriac patriarch (b. 1126)
- Raymond IV (or Raimund), count and regent of Tripoli
- Vladimir II Yaroslavich, Kievan prince (House of Rurik)
