= Vayres, Gironde =

Vayres
- Commune
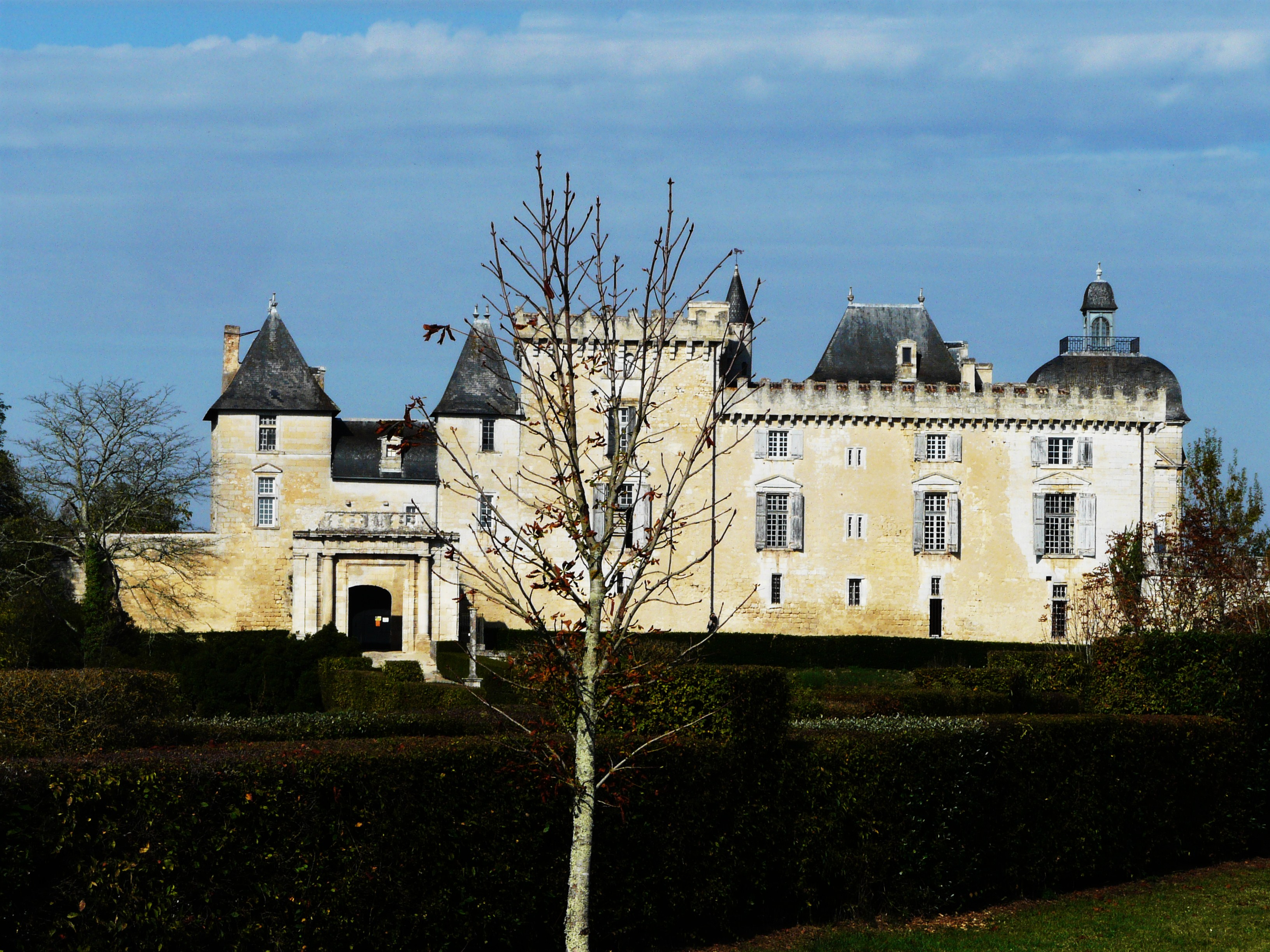
- Chateau

- Coat of arms
- Location of Vayres
- Location within France Location within Nouvelle-Aquitaine
- Coordinates: 44°53′53″N 0°18′47″W
- Country: France
- Region: Nouvelle-Aquitaine
- Department: Gironde
- Arrondissement: Libourne
- Canton: Le Libournais-Fronsadais
- Intercommunality: CA Libournais

Government
  - Mayor (2020–2026): Jacques Legrand
- Area^{1}: 14.46 km^{2} (5.58 sq mi)
- Elevation: 12 m (39 ft)
- Highest elevation: 39 m (128 ft)
- Lowest elevation: 2 m (6.6 ft)
- Population (2023): 4,615
  - Density: 319.2/km^{2} (826.6/sq mi)
- Time zone: UTC+01:00 (CET)
  - Summer (DST): UTC+02:00 (CEST)
- INSEE/Postal code: 33539 /33870
- ^{1} French Land Register data, which excludes lakes, ponds, glaciers > 1 km^{2} (0.386 sq mi or 247 acres) and river estuaries.

Vayres (French pronunciation: [vɛjʁ]; Occitan: Vairas) is a commune in the Arrondissement of Libourne, in the Gironde department in Nouvelle-Aquitaine in southwestern France.

== Etymology ==
The name Vayres comes from Varatedo, the property of someone named Varus during the Gallo-Roman period.

In 1060 the parish of Sanctus Johannes de Vayras is attested and the area is mentioned again in the 13th and 14th centuries.

== Population ==
Historical population
Year	Pop.	±% p.a.
1968	1,845	—
1975	2,295	+3.17%
1982	2,361	+0.41%
1990	2,491	+0.67%
1999	2,631	+0.61%
2007	3,215	+2.54%
2012	3,543	+1.96%
2017	3,956	+2.23%
2023	4,615	+2.60%
Source: INSEE

== Location ==
Vayres is located in the Entre-deux-Mers natural region of France on the left bank of the Dordogne, in the Bordeaux attraction area making it a satellite village of Bordeaux and the nearby town of Libourne. Despite Vayre's location 70 km from the Atlantic cost, the village still gets waves on the Dordogne through a process known as Tidal bores.

Vayres is located 6.6 km west of Libourne, 12.4 km south-west of Saint-Émilion and 21.5 km north-east of Bordeaux. The village in the proximity of Vayres on the left bank are: Arveyres to the south-east, Saint-Germain-du-Puch to the south, Beychac-et-Caillau to the south-west, Saint-Sulpice-et-Cameyrac to the west and Izon to the north. And on the right bank are: Saint-Michel-de-Fronsac to the north-east and Fronsac to the east.

== Transportation ==
The commune is accessible via exit number 7 titled "Vayres et Izon" (Vayres and Izon) and exit number 8 titled "Vayres, Arveyres, Saint-Germain-du-Puch et Libourne" (Vayres, Arveyres, Saint-Germain-du-Puch and Libourne) on the A89 autoroute.

=== By rail ===
The line Paris-Austerlitz to Bordeaux-Saint-Jean passes through Vayres stopping at "Gare de Vayres" (Vayres railway station).

== Sights ==
- The Château de Vayres (Vayres Castle) was remodeled by the 16th-century French engineer Louis de Foix, deceased 1611.

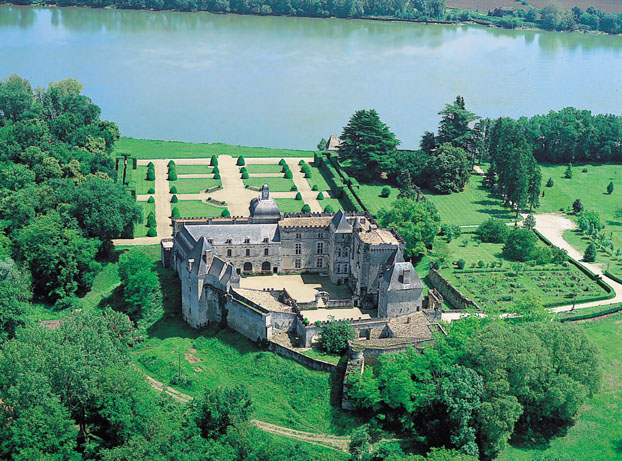
Aerial view of the chateau

The castle was sold in 1583 by King Henry IV of Navarre largely ruined, to Ogier de Gourgue, in charge of the treasury of Guyenne, a friend of philosopher and political thinker Michel de Montaigne. Ogier de Gourge commissioned a well-known architect, Louis de Foix, who was building the Cordouan lighthouse and had worked for a few years for the king of Spain Philip II.

== History ==
Vayres has been inhabited since antiquity. It was located on the Roman road that connected Burdigala, now Bordeaux to Vesunna, now Périgueux. At the time it was a camp and market but gradually developed due to its location on a rocky outcrop overlooking the confluence between the Gestas and the Dordogne on which the castle was built. Vayres was a Barony, then a Marquisat where the Seigneurs were rich and powerful. The first written records of the Seigneurs of Vayres were the statements of various donations (Frenchs: états de donations diverses), written between 1060 and 1086. In the 11th century the Seigneurs from the Gombaud family owned Vayres and Lesparre-Médoc. An archbishop of Bordeaux also had this name at the end of the 10th century. During the French Revolution the parish of Saint-Jean de Vayres became the commune of Vayres.

== See also ==
- Communes of the Gironde department
