= Château de Busset =

Castle in Auvergne-Rhône-Alpes, France

Coordinates: 46°3′47″N 3°30′36″E

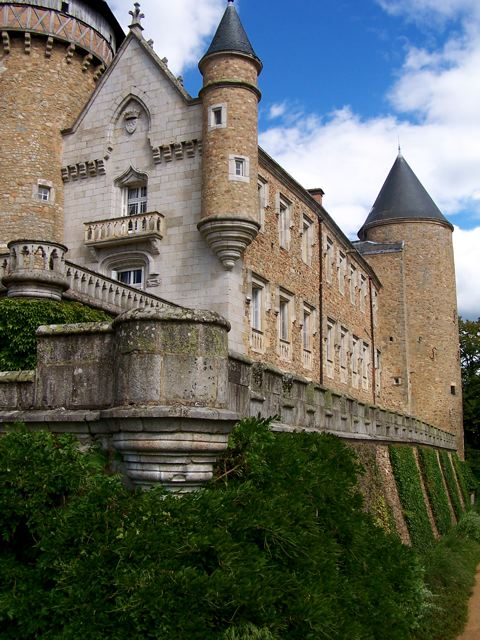
Château de Busset

The Château de Busset is a castle developed into a château in the commune of Busset in the Allier department of France. It is the ancestral home of the Bourbon-Busset family. A Swiss conglomerate family currently owns the property.

The castle remains private property and is not open to public viewing. In 1981, it was listed as a monument historique by the French Ministry of Culture.

== See also ==
- List of castles in France
