= Louise Borgia =

French aristocrat

Louise Borgia T.O.S.D.
- Dame de Châlus, (suo jure); Duchess of Valentinois, (suo jure)
- Reign: 12 March 1507 – 1553
- Born: 17 May 1500; France
- Died: 1553 (aged 52–53); Château de Busset, France
- Noble family: Borgia
- Spouses: Louis II de La Tremouille (m. 1517; d. 1525); Philippe de Bourbon, Seigneur de Bourbon-Busset (m. 1530)
- Issue: Second marriage Claude, Count of Busset; Marguerite de Bourbon; Henri de Bourbon; Catherine de Bourbon; Jean, Seigneur of La Motte-Feuilly; Jérôme, Seigneur of Montet
- Father: Cesare Borgia, Duke of Valentinois
- Mother: Charlotte of Albret

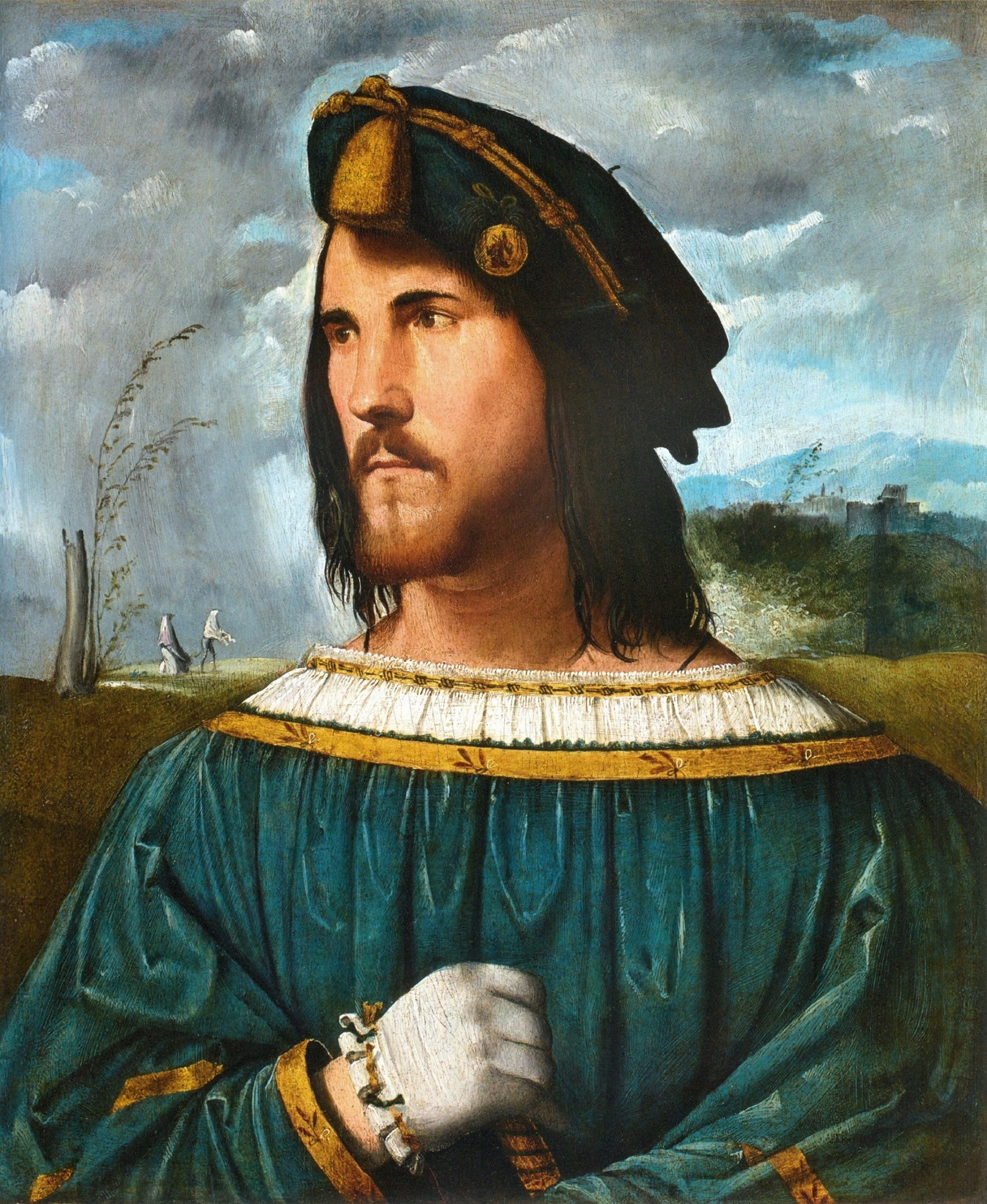
Cesare Borgia, Louise's father

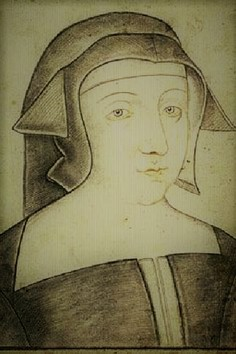
Charlotte d'Albret, mother of Louise

Louise Borgia (17 May 1500 – 1553) was a French noblewoman. She was the daughter of Cesare Borgia, Duke of Valentinois, who died when she was almost seven years old. She was also Dame de Châlus suo jure, a title she inherited from her mother Charlotte of Albret and Duchess of Valentinois, suo jure. She was a member of the Third Order of Saint Dominic.

== Early life ==
Louise was born on 17 May 1500. She was Cesare Borgia's only child with his spouse, Charlotte of Albret. Her paternal grandparents were Pope Alexander VI of the House of Borgia and Vannozza dei Cattanei, and her maternal grandparents were Alain I of Albret, Lord of Albret, and Frances, Countess of Périgord. She had at least eleven illegitimate half-siblings from her father's relationships with other women.

Her father had left her mother soon after their marriage in 1499 as a kind of unofficial hostage in France to ensure that Borgia stayed loyal to French interests. In February 1500, Borgia learned that Charlotte was pregnant with his child, which was greeted with joy by her paternal grandfather (who offered to pay several thousand ducats to France if his son’s pregnant wife should be brought to Rome. Charlotte, however, did not want to make the long journey while she was pregnant.)

Their daughter was named Louise in honor of Louis XII. Louise’s grandfather wrote to Cesare and asked him to come to France, to visit his wife and see his child. Borgia’s reply was that he "cared little for returning to France."

Even after the birth, it came apparent that King Louis was reluctant to release Charlotte and Louise, even if she wished to travel to Italy. Charlotte and Louise made their home at La Tour Blanche in Issoudun.

== Betrothals ==
During her childhood Louise was betrothed in August of 1502 to Borgia's godson Federigo the son of Francesco II Gonzaga, Marquess of Mantua. This alliance would have allied the Gonzagas and the Borgias and sealed a non-attack agreement on both sides. Borgia's armies had previously dispossessed Francesco's brother-in-law Guidobaldo da Montefeltro of his lands. This proposed marriage would not come to pass, however, as Louise’s grandfather Pope Alexander VI died on August 18, 1503, leaving the Borgias' power and influence waning.

Louise was next betrothed in 1503 to Francesco Maria della Rovere, who during Cesare Borgia's wars, had barely escaped being murdered by Borgia's troops, as Francesco was the designated heir of his uncle Guibaldo. However, things had changed since then, and Cesare hoped to make a beneficial alliance with Francesco's uncle the Cardinal Della Rovere.

On 12 March 1507, her father was killed at the siege of Viana in the service of her maternal uncle, King John III of Navarre. Her mother withdrew from life to her castle of La Motte-Feuilly in Touraine and dedicated herself to mourning and administrating her estates in the company of her daughter.

Her mother was her guardian until her mother's death on 11 March 1514 when Louise was not quite fourteen years old. Louise then succeeded her mother as Dame de Châlus. After this she was placed by her maternal grandfather in the household of Louise of Savoy. She stayed there for about three years then lived at the court of Navarre. She never met, but did correspond with her aunt Lucrezia Borgia.

Around this time another marriage candidate who was proposed was Lorenzo de' Medici, Duke of Urbino, but in the end his uncle Pope Leo X wanted a bride with stronger familial connections to the French king, and chose Madeleine de La Tour d'Auvergne instead.

In 1516, the possibility of a marriage with her former betrothed Federigo Gonzaga was once again brought up, but as the proposed groom was then a hostage of Francis I of France, who would not allow the young man to return to Mantua until he agreed to marry Maria Paleologa, this presented some difficulty and the marriage didn't materialize.

== Marriages ==
Louise married her first husband on 7 April 1517. He was Louis II de la Trémoille, Governor of Burgundy. When asked why he was agreeing to marrying the daughter of infamous Cesare Borgia, he replied that he was marrying her because she was of the House of Albret, whose women had always been known for their virtue. Louis was killed at the Battle of Pavia on 24 February 1525, leaving Louise a widow at the age of 24.

Louise married her second husband, Philippe de Bourbon, Seigneur de Bourbon-Busset on 3 February 1530. They made their home at the Château de Busset, where she made many renovations, including a covered arcade on the ground floor and a gallery in the east wing. Together, Philippe and Louise had six children.

== Character ==
She was described by a contemporary as "a very noble and virtuous lady, heiress to perfections as well as the riches of her mother, whose manners and disposition she made her own, a lady in short, as chaste, virtuous and gentle as her father was possessed, cruel and wicked."

== Death ==
Louise Borgia died at the Château de Busset on an unknown date in 1553.

== Children ==
- Claude de Bourbon, Count of Busset, of Puyagut, and of Châlus (18 October 1531 – c. 1588), married Marguerite de La Rochefoucauld, by whom he had issue.
- Marguerite de Bourbon (10 October 1532 – 8 September 1591), married Jean de Pierre-Buffiere, Baron of Pontarion. The marriage was childless.
- Henri de Bourbon (1533–1534)
- Catherine de Bourbon (born 14 October 1534)
- Jean de Bourbon, Seigneur of La Motte-Feuilly and de Montet (born 2 September 1537), married Euchariste de La Brosse-Morlet, by whom he had issue.
- Jerôme de Bourbon, Seigneur de Montet (19 October 1543 – before 1619), married Jeanne de Rollat. The marriage was childless.

== Sources ==
- Hinnebusch, William A. (2004). Kleine Geschichte des Dominikanerordens. Leipzig.150
- Poitrineau, Abel, ed. (1973). Le mémoire sur l'état de la Généralité de Riom en 1697 dresse pour l'instruction du duc de Bourgogne par l'intendant Lefevre d'Ormesson (in French). Institut D'Etudes du Massif Central.
- Taylor, Jane H. M. (2014). Rewriting Arthurian Romance in Renaissance France. D. S. Brewer.
