= Charlotte of Albret =

Wife of Cesare Borgia; sister of King John III of Navarre

- Dame de Châlus
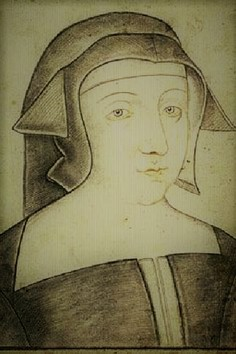
- Born: 1480; France
- Died: 11 March 1514 (aged 33–34); The Chateau of La Motte-Feuilly, France
- Noble family: Albret (by birth); Borgia (by marriage)
- Spouses: Cesare Borgia, Duke of Valentinois
- Issue: Louise Borgia, Duchess of Valentinois
- Father: Alain I of Albret, Lord of Albret
- Mother: Frances, Countess of Périgord

Charlotte of Albret (1480 – 11 March 1514), Dame de Châlus, was a French noblewoman and regent. She was the sister of King John III of Navarre and the wife of the widely notorious Cesare Borgia, whom she married in 1499. She was the mother of his only legitimate child, Louise Borgia, to whom she acted as regent of the Duchy of Valentinois from 1507 to 1514, following the death of Cesare.

== Early life ==
Charlotte was born in 1480, the daughter of Alain I of Albret, Lord of Albret, and Frances, Countess of Périgord. She had six siblings including John, who became King of Navarre upon his marriage to Catherine of Navarre.

== Marriage to Cesare Borgia ==
On his accession to the throne, Louis XII of France intended to ensure that Brittany remained tied to the Kingdom of France, aiming to marry Anne of Brittany for the purpose; however, he was married at that time to Joan of Valois.

The Foix-Albret, led by Alain d'Albret, feared a French takeover of the Viscounty of Béarn, so the Navarrese monarchs, Catherine and John (d'Albret) initiated a rapprochement with Louis XII in order to appease his ambitions in Béarn, by supporting Louis XII in his attempt to marry the Breton princess. Louis XII demanded that Pope Alexander VI issue an annulment of his marriage to Joan. The latter responded in kind by requiring a princess of royal blood to marry his son Cesare. The monarchs of Navarre proposed in turn Charlotte for the bargain.

The political move was designed to provide Catherine and John with peace of mind to the north of the Pyrenees, while at the same time establishing friendly diplomatic relations with Rome that could pave the way to solve their conflict over ecclesiastic appointments in Navarre, especially concerning the bishop of Pamplona Pallaviccini, a designation contested by the Navarrese monarchs. The conditions were set down on the contract of the wedding held in the spring of 1499. The bride's brother Amanieu d'Albret was also to be made a cardinal.

On 10 May 1499, at the age of 19 at Blois, Charlotte married the condottiero Cesare Borgia, who was the illegitimate son of Pope Alexander VI and Vannozza dei Cattanei. He had recently been created Duke of Valentinois by King Louis XII of France. The marriage was political, arranged with the purpose of strengthening Cesare's alliance with France. Cesare did not remain for long in the territories under the rule of the Foix-Albret. He left for Italy soon after the wedding, with Charlotte pregnant. He neither returned to France, nor ever met his legitimate daughter. Cesare accompanied King Louis in his invasion of Italy.

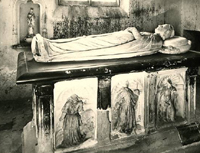
Tomb and effigy in La Motte-Feuilly.

Charlotte was described as having been "beautiful and rich". In 1504, she became the owner of the properties of Feusines, Néret, and La Motte-Feuilly. Cesare and Charlotte had one daughter together:

- Louise Borgia, suo jure Dame de Châlus, suo jure Duchess of Valentinois (17 May 1500 – 1553), she first married on 7 April 1517 Louis II de la Trémoille, Governor of Burgundy; she married secondly on 3 February 1530, Philippe de Bourbon, Siegneur de Busset, by whom she had issue.

== Regency and later life ==
After escaping the Spanish prison, Cesare died at the siege of Viana on 12 March 1507 while serving Charlotte's brother, the King of Navarre, with whom he had sought refuge. Following his death, Charlotte acted as regent for Louise, who had succeeded her father as Duchess of Valentinois.

Charlotte died almost seven years after Cesare's death on 11 March 1514 at the Château of La Motte-Feuilly. She was buried in a tomb at the church at La Motte-Feuilly.

== Sources ==
- Henry Gardiner Adams, ed. (1857). "Albret, Charlotte d'" . A Cyclopaedia of Female Biography: 26. Wikidata Q115583441 – via Wikisource.
- Jansen, Sharon L. (2002). The Monstrous Regiment of Women: Female Rulers in Early Modern Europe. Palgrave Macmillan.
- Mackie, John Duncan (1991). The Earlier Tudors, 1485-1558. Oxford University Press.
- Marek, George Richard (1976). The Bed and the Throne: the Life of Isabella D'Este. Harper & Row.
