= Jacques de Bourbon =

Jacques de Bourbon may refer to:

- Jacques de Bourbon-Busset (1912–2001), French novelist, essayist and politician
- Jaime, Duke of Madrid (1870–1931), also known as Jacques de Bourbon, Duke of Anjou, Carlist claimant to the throne in Spain and legitimate claimant to the throne in France
- James I, Count of La Marche (1319–1362), also known as Jacques de Bourbon, Count of La Marche, son of Louis I, Duke of Bourbon and Mary of Avesnes
