= Château de Châlus-Chabrol =

Castle in Nouvelle-Aquitaine, France

Coordinates: 45.6574°N 0.9798°E

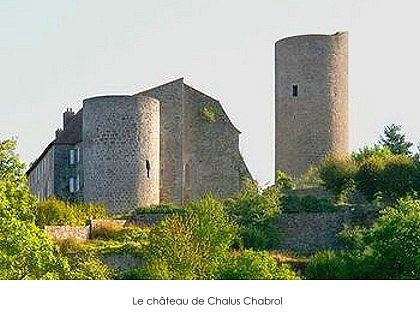
Château de Châlus-Chabrol

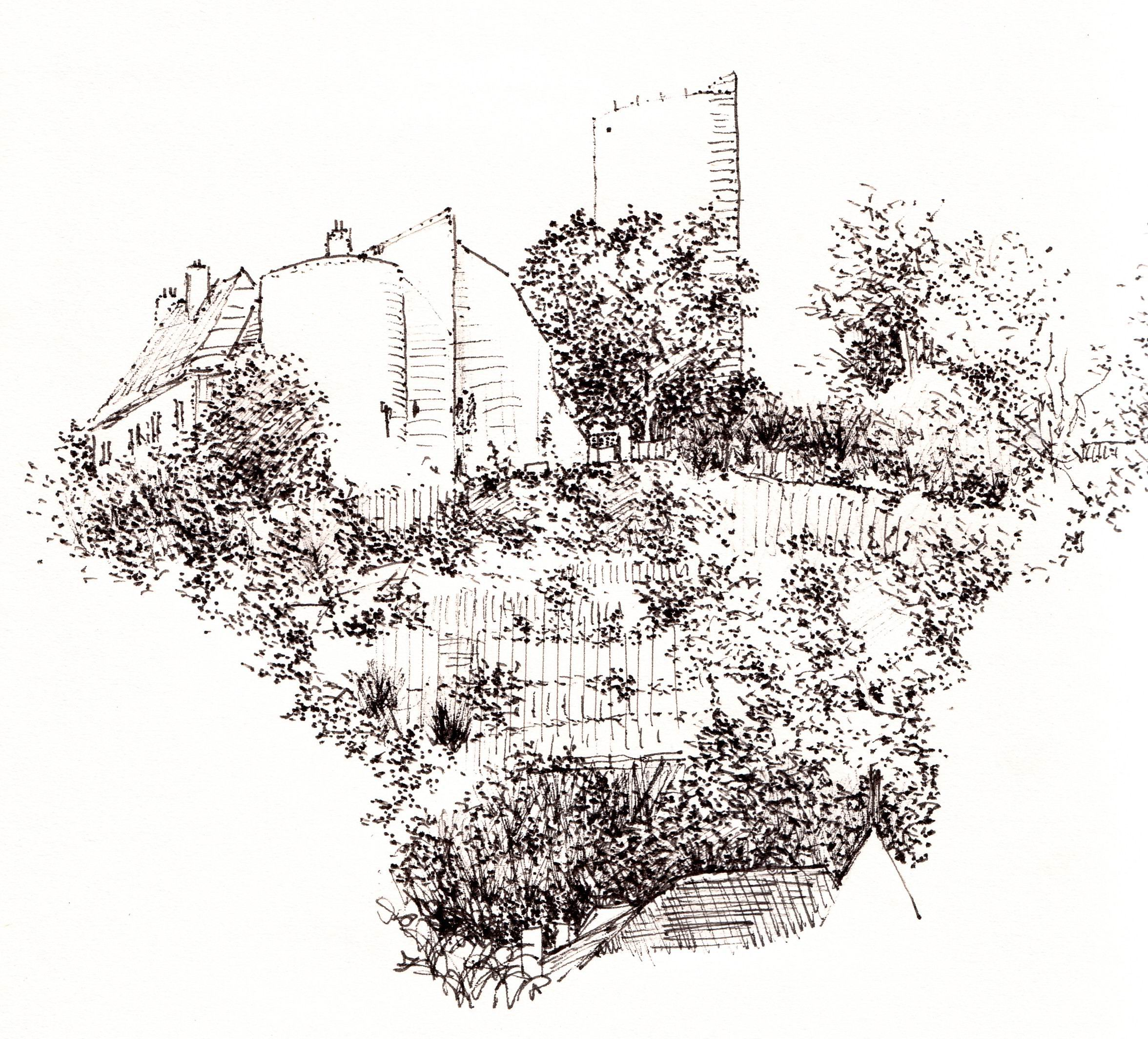
Château de Châlus-Chabrol by Ildo Moratti

The Château de Châlus-Chabrol (Occitan Limousin : Chasteu de Chasluç-Chabròl) is a castle in the commune of Châlus in the département of Haute-Vienne, France.

The castle dominates the town of Châlus. It consists today of an isolated circular keep (12th century) and a residential building constructed between the 11th and 13th centuries, enlarged in the 17th century.

The castle protected the southern approach to Limoges and the north–south route between Paris and Spain, as well as the ancient east–west route linking the Mediterranean and the Atlantic.

It is most famous for the death of King Richard the Lionheart, who died there while besieging the castle in 1199 from a crossbow bolt shot, according to legend, by one of the defenders called Bertrand de Gourdon. His entrails are buried in the castle chapel. The opening of the 1976 film Robin and Marian was set at the château de Chalus-Chabrol but filmed elsewhere.

The castle's owners included Charlotte of Albret and Louise Borgia, wife and daughter respectively of Cesare Borgia.

Château de Chalus-Chabrol has been listed as a monument historique by the French Ministry of Culture since 1925.

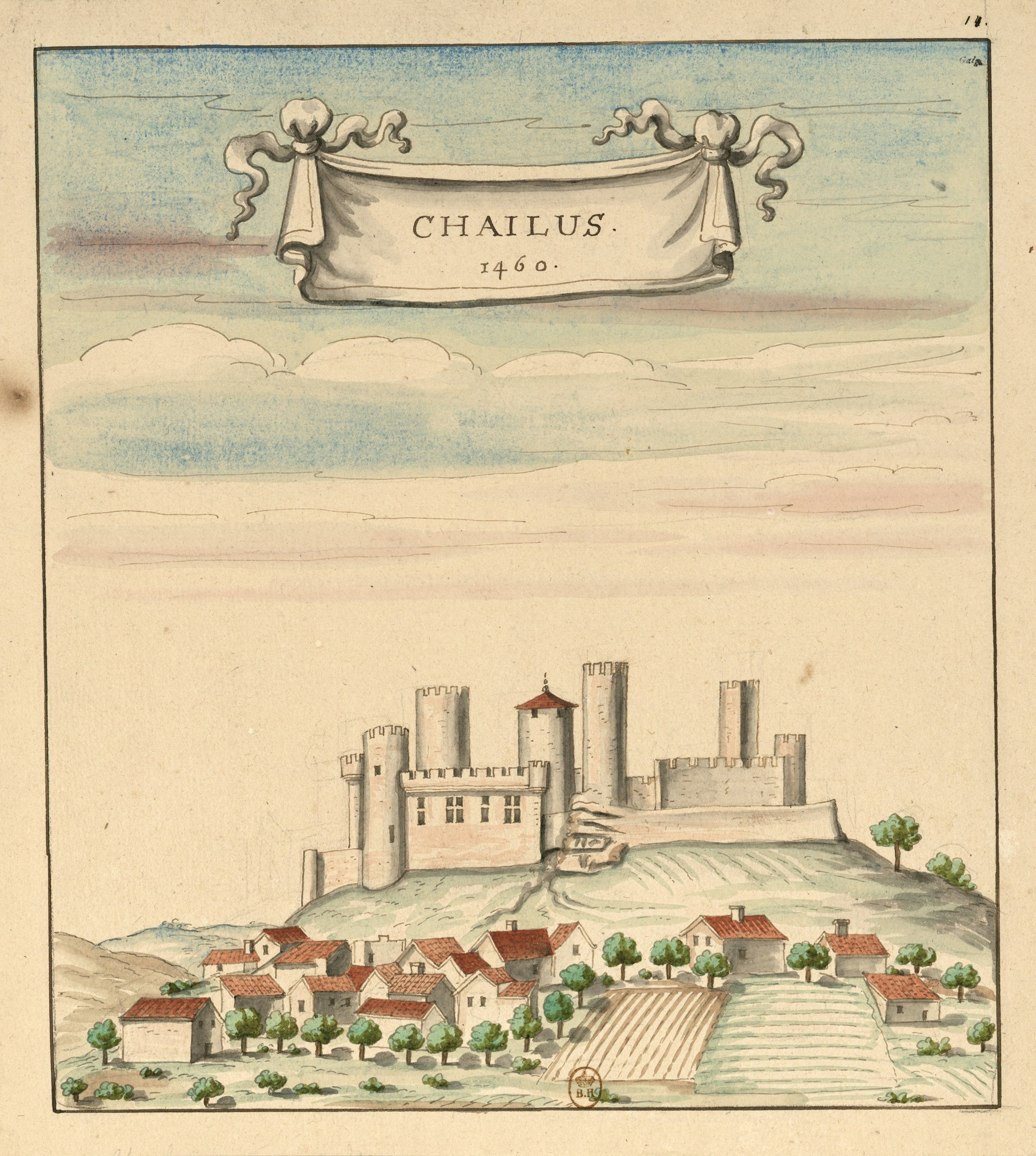
The castle in 1460

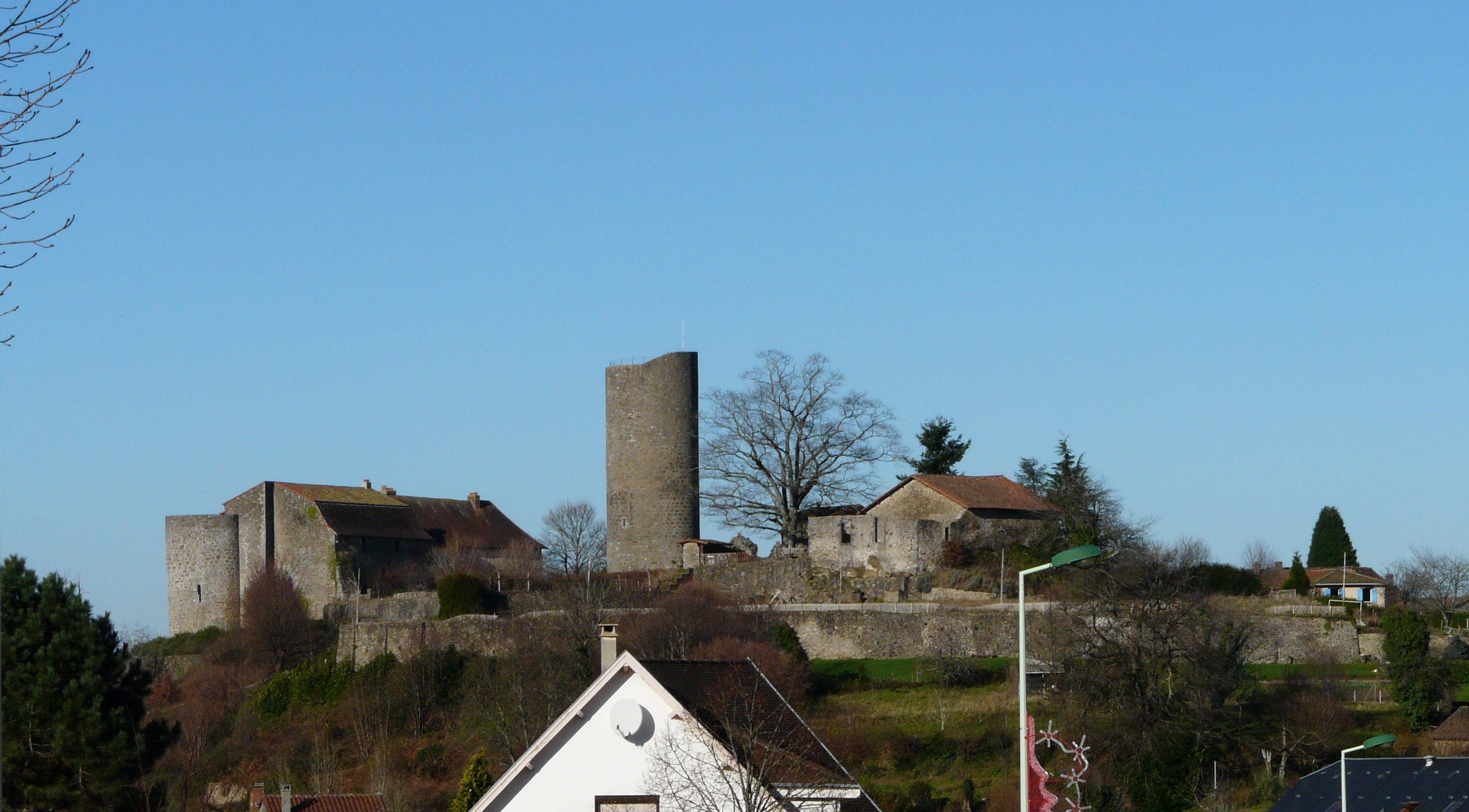
General view

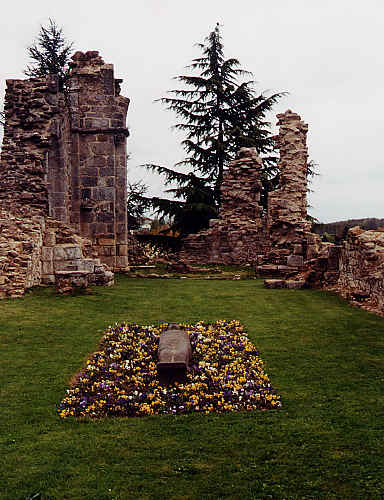
Memorial to King Richard I of England

== See also ==
- List of castles in France
