= Canton of La Presqu'île =

Coordinates: 44.93°N 0.49°W

The canton of La Presqu'île is an administrative division of the Gironde department, southwestern France. It was created at the French canton reorganisation which came into effect in March 2015. Its seat is in Ambarès-et-Lagrave.

It consists of the following communes:

1. Ambarès-et-Lagrave
2. Ambès
3. Beychac-et-Caillau
4. Carbon-Blanc
5. Sainte-Eulalie
6. Saint-Loubès
7. Saint-Louis-de-Montferrand
8. Saint-Sulpice-et-Cameyrac
9. Saint-Vincent-de-Paul
