= Mercadier =

Occitan warrior

Mercadier or Mercardier (died 10 April 1200) was a famous Occitan warrior of the 12th century, and the leader of a group of mercenaries in the service of King Richard I of England.

In 1183 he appears as a leader of Brabançon mercenaries in Southern France. He entered King Richard's service in 1184, attacking and laying waste to lands of Aimar V of Limoges. In 1188 he managed seventeen castles captured from the count of Toulouse. Suggestions that he accompanied Richard on the Third Crusade are based on a charter that has been established as a forgery. There is no evidence that Mercadier was with King Philip II of France when the king left the Holy Land for France. Instead, it appears that Mercadier remained in the Angevin realm with his troops to defend Richard's estates in the latter's absence.

After Richard's return from the Holy Land, Mercadier accompanied him everywhere as his right hand man, travelling and fighting by his side. Richard eulogized Mercadier's exploits in his letters, and gave him the estates left by Ademar de Bainac in Limousin, who died without heirs around 1190. During the various wars between Richard and Philip, Mercadier fought successively in Berry, Normandy, Flanders and Brittany. When Richard was mortally wounded at the siege of Châlus in March 1199, it was Mercadier's physician who cared for him. According to one account, Mercadier avenged his death by storming the castle, hanging the defenders and flaying alive Pierre Basile, the crossbowman who had shot the king, despite Richard's last act pardoning him.

Mercadier then entered the service of Eleanor of Aquitaine, and ravaged Gascony and the city of Angers. On Easter Monday, 10 April 1200, he was assassinated while on a visit to Bordeaux to pay his respects to Eleanor of Aquitaine. His murder was at the hands of six men-at-arms employed by Brandin, a rival mercenary captain in the service of Richard's successor, John.

One of the bridges of the Château Gaillard (built by his employer King Richard) is named for him.

== In historical fiction ==
In five novels of Jean d'Aillon's series Les Aventures de Guilhem d'Ussel, chevalier troubadour, set during the reign of Philip II of France, Guilhem d'Ussel encounters several mercenary chiefs: Mercadier, Lambert Cadoc (Lord of Gaillon) and Brandin:

- De taille et d'estoc (1187) (2012)
- Marseille, 1198 (2010)
- Paris, 1199 (2010)
- Londres, 1200 (2011)
- Montségur, 1201 (2012)

Mercadier, played by Bill Maynard, also made an appearance in Robin and Marian, the 1976 film, serving as Richard the Lionheart's right hand man.

Mercardier features prominently in The Outlaw Chronicles series by Angus Donald, especially books 4 (Warlord) and 5 (Grail Knight), as a major antagonist. He is portrayed as a ruthless killer and mercenary leader with few or no redeeming qualities, and as the main perpetrator of English atrocities during the Third Crusade and King Richard's wars against the French.

== Sources ==
- Powicke, Maurice (1913). Loss of Normandy, 1198–1204. Manchester University Press.
- "Mercadier", in Bibliothèque de l'École des Chartes, 1st series, t. iii., pp. 417–443.
- The Art of Warfare in Western Europe during the Middle Ages from the Eighth Century (Warfare in History) by J. F. Verbruggen, pp. 116–117*
