= René Labat (Assyriologist) =

French assyriologist (1904–1974)

- Born: 5 June 1904; Saint-Loubès
- Died: 3 April 1974 (aged 69); Paris
- Occupation: Assyriologist

René Labat (5 June 1904 – 3 April 1974) was a 20th-century French Assyriologist.

He was a member of the Académie des Inscriptions et Belles-Lettres from 1968 to 1974 and professor at the Collège de France from 1952 to his death.

== Biography ==
=== Family ===
Born in Gascony, he was the father of Florence Malbran-Labat, a philologist.

=== Career ===
In 1932, he graduated from the École pratique des hautes études. The following year, he was elected directeur d'études at the 4^{e} section to teach the assyrian language.

In 1938, he became docteur ès lettres.

In 1952, he was appointed at the chair of Assyriology at the Collège de France.

He became secretary of the Association of Professors at the College de France before being elected vice president in 1965. He remained in this position until his death.

He particularly studied the Elamite language, after father Scheil.

=== Academic functions ===
He was a member of the Académie des inscriptions et belles-lettres (ASMP) from 1968 to 1974, of the German Archaeological Institute, and of the Société asiatique, which he presided from 1969 to 1974. In the latter capacity, he chaired the events organized for the hundred and fiftieth anniversary of the Society and for the hundredth international congress in 1973.

He also wrote the article "Littérature assyro-babylonienne" of the Encyclopædia Universalis and collaborated with the Cambridge Ancient History, the Fischer Weltgeschichte (in which he wrote about assyrian and neo-babylonian empires) and the 'Histoire générale des sciences.

== Selected publications ==
- 1932: L’akkadien de Boghaz-Köi. Étude sur la langue des lettres, traités et vocabulaires akkadiens trouvés à Boghaz-Köi,
- 1933: Commentaires assyro-babyloniens sur les présages,
- 1935: Le poème babylonien de la Création, edition and translation,
- 1938: Le caractère religieux de la royauté assyro-babylonienne, main thesis,
- 1938: Hémérologies et ménologies d’Assur, complementary thesis,
- 1943: Un almanach babylonien,
- 1948: Manuel d’épigraphie akkadienne : signes, syllabaires, idéogrammes,
- 1951: Traité akkadien de diagnostics et pronostics médicaux', 2 volumes,
- 1953: La médecine babylonienne,
- 1954: À propos de la chirurgie babylonienne,
- 1957: La science antique et médiévale. Des origines à 1450, collectif,
- 1961: Kaštariti, Phraorte et les débuts de l'histoire mède,
- 1965: Un calendrier babylonien des travaux, des signes et des mois (séries iqqur ipus),
- 1970: Les grands textes de la pensée babylonienne,
- 1970: Les religions du Proche-Orient asiatique. Textes babyloniens, ougaritiques, hittites, edition and translation,
- 1974: Suse ville royale. 11 textes littéraires de Suse, with Dietz Otto Edzard, in Mémoires de la Délégation archéologique française en Iran,
- 1976: Saint Louis et l'Orient.

=== Other translations ===
- Code of Hammurabi, with Jean Bottéro.

== Bibliography ==
- Institut de France : le second siècle, 1895-1995, direction of Jean Leclant, Institut de France, 3 vol., 1999, 2001 and 2004
