= Saint-Loubès =

- Commune
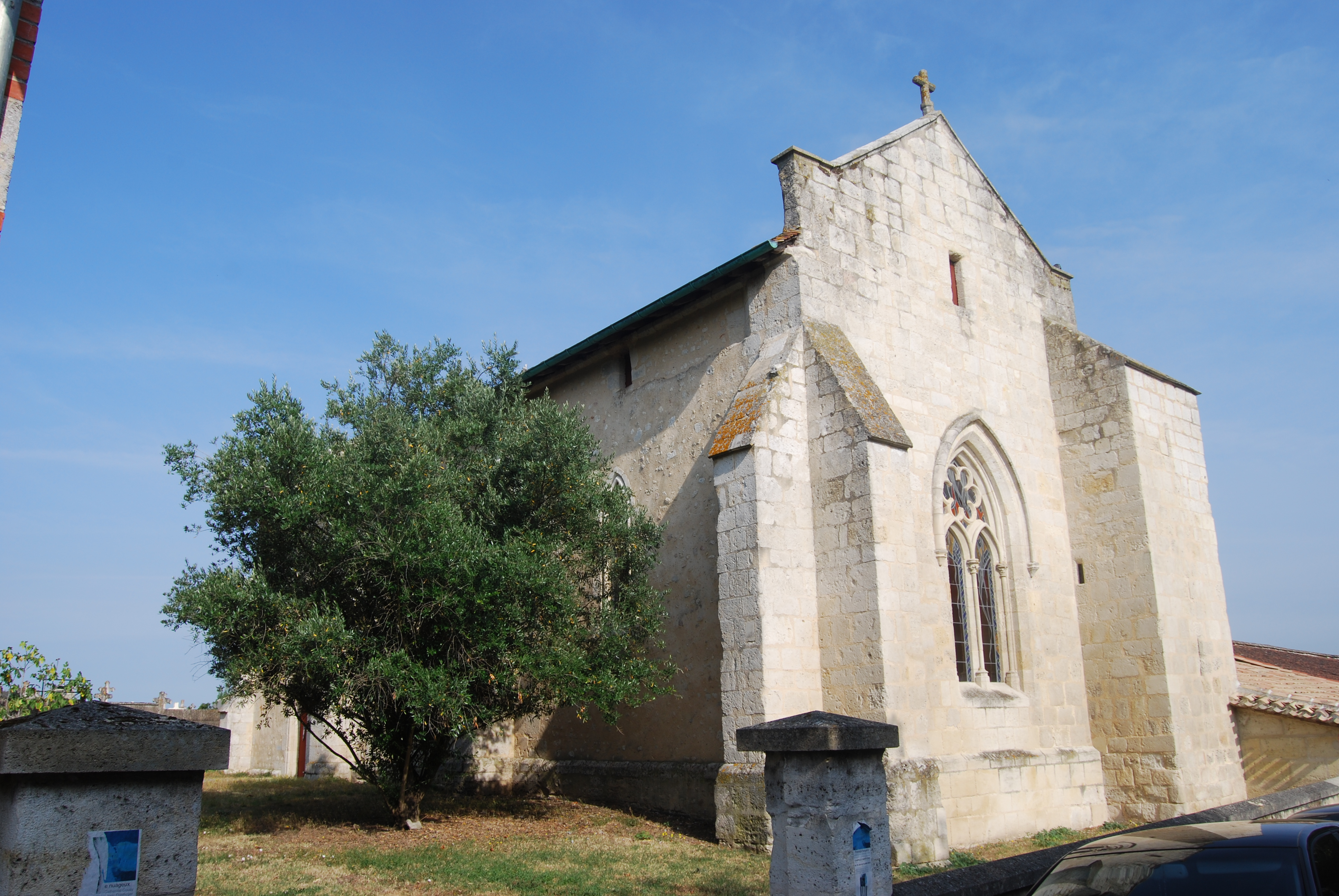
- The chapel in Saint-Loubès

- Coat of arms
- Location of Saint-Loubès
- Location within France Location within Nouvelle-Aquitaine
- Coordinates: 44°55′05″N 0°25′37″W
- Country: France
- Region: Nouvelle-Aquitaine
- Department: Gironde
- Arrondissement: Bordeaux
- Canton: La Presqu'île
- Intercommunality: CC Les Rives de la Laurence

Government
  - Mayor (2020–2026): Emmanuelle Favre
- Area^{1}: 25.07 km^{2} (9.68 sq mi)
- Elevation: 10 m (33 ft)
- Highest elevation: 57 m (187 ft)
- Lowest elevation: 1 m (3.3 ft)
- Population (2023): 10,027
  - Density: 400.0/km^{2} (1,036/sq mi)
- Time zone: UTC+01:00 (CET)
  - Summer (DST): UTC+02:00 (CEST)
- INSEE/Postal code: 33433 /33450
- ^{1} French Land Register data, which excludes lakes, ponds, glaciers > 1 km^{2} (0.386 sq mi or 247 acres) and river estuaries.

Saint-Loubès (French pronunciation: [sɛ̃ lubɛs]; Gascon: Sent Lobés) is a commune in the Gironde department in Nouvelle-Aquitaine in southwestern France. The Assyriologist René Labat (1904–1974) was born in Saint-Loubès, as well as silent movie actor Max Linder (1883–1925).

== Population ==
Historical population
Year	Pop.	±% p.a.
1968	3,328	—
1975	4,027	+2.76%
1982	4,956	+3.01%
1990	6,207	+2.85%
1999	7,090	+1.49%
2007	7,710	+1.05%
2012	8,361	+1.63%
2017	9,509	+2.61%
2023	10,027	+0.89%
Source: INSEE

== See also ==
- Communes of the Gironde department
