= Louis de Bourbon-Busset =

French sports shooter

Personal information
- Full name: François Louis Joseph Marie de Bourbon-Busset
- Born: 14 April 1875 Moulins, Allier, France
- Died: 23 July 1954 (aged 79) Busset, France

Sport
- Sport: Sports shooting

Louis de Bourbon-Busset (14 April 1875 – 23 July 1954) was a French sports shooter. He competed in the team clay pigeon event at the 1924 Summer Olympics.
