= Bourbon-Busset =

Family

House of Bourbon-Busset
- Original arms of the family
- Parent house: House of Bourbon
- Country: France
- Founded: 1498; 528 years ago
- Founder: Pierre de Bourbon, Baron of Busset
- Current head: Charles de Bourbon, Count of Busset
- Titles: Count of Busset; Baron of Busset; Baron of Châlus; Baron of Puysagut; Baron of Vésigneux
- Cadet branches: House of Bourbon-Châlus

The Bourbon-Busset family is a cadet branch of the House of Bourbon, being thus agnatic descendants of the Capetian dynasty. Historically, they have been regarded as non-dynastic since decisions rendered by King Louis XI.

Possibly, however, the family may be canonically legitimate, in which case it is the most senior extant male-line branch of the Capetians, and senior to the Bourbons which reign today in Spain and Luxembourg and have in the past ruled France, Naples and Sicily, as well as to the House of Braganza, also Capetians by illegitimate descent.

The head of the family uses the title of Count of Busset, which derives its name from the marriage of Pierre de Bourbon (son of Louis de Bourbon, Bishop of Liège) with Marguerite de Tourzel, heiress of the barony of Busset. Their son Philippe married Louise Borgia, Duchess of Valentinois, only legitimate child of Cesare Borgia, Duke of Valentinois.

== Origin ==
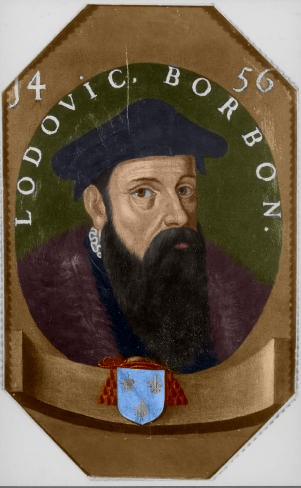
The Bourbon-Bussets are descended from Louis de Bourbon, Bishop of Liège

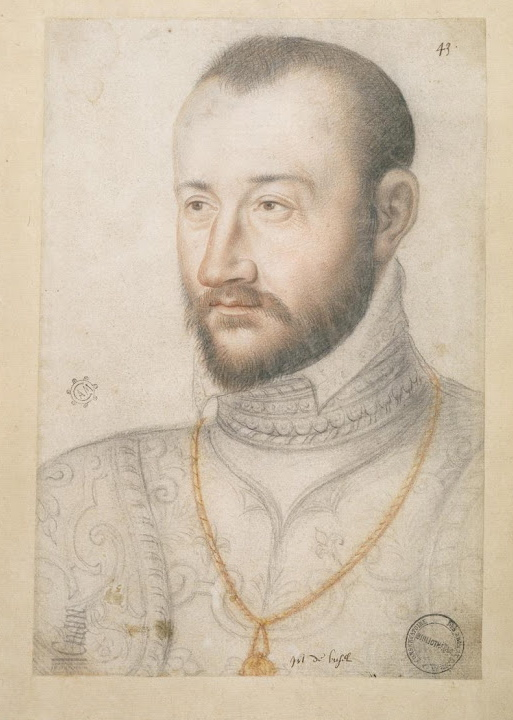
Claude de Bourbon-Busset (1531–1588), father of César de Bourbon-Busset (1565–1630)

The House of Bourbon-Busset descends in male line from Pierre de Bourbon (1464–1529), the eldest son of Louis de Bourbon, Bishop of Liège (1438–1482), who was a son of Charles I, Duke of Bourbon. Louis, in male line a sixth cousin of King Charles VII of France, married, without royal licence, Catharine d'Egmond, a daughter of Arnold, Duke of Gelderland (probably illegitimate, as the ducal House of Egmont's chronicles never recognized her among princesses of Gelderland).

From this union, three natural sons were born:

- Pierre de Bourbon (1464–1529), chamberlain of Louis XII; married in 1498 Marguerite de Tourzel d'Alègre, heiress to the barony of Busset; this alliance was the start of the House de Bourbon-Busset;
- Louis de Bourbon (1465–1500);
- Jacques de Bourbon (1466–1537), Jesuit priest.

Although the marriage between Louis and Catherine took place before Louis was ordained a priest, which would have made it canonically impossible for him to marry, it was kept secret, being against the interests of Louis XI. French alliances in the Low Countries were not compatible with those of the House of Egmont. The French king therefore never recognized any children of the marriage as legitimate. There was a de facto legitimization of the Bourbon-Bussets when they were allowed the treatment of a Cousin du Roi. For the rest of history, the Bourbon-Bussets never claimed anything more than what they had, and constantly remained faithful servants of the Bourbon kings.

== Historical evolution ==
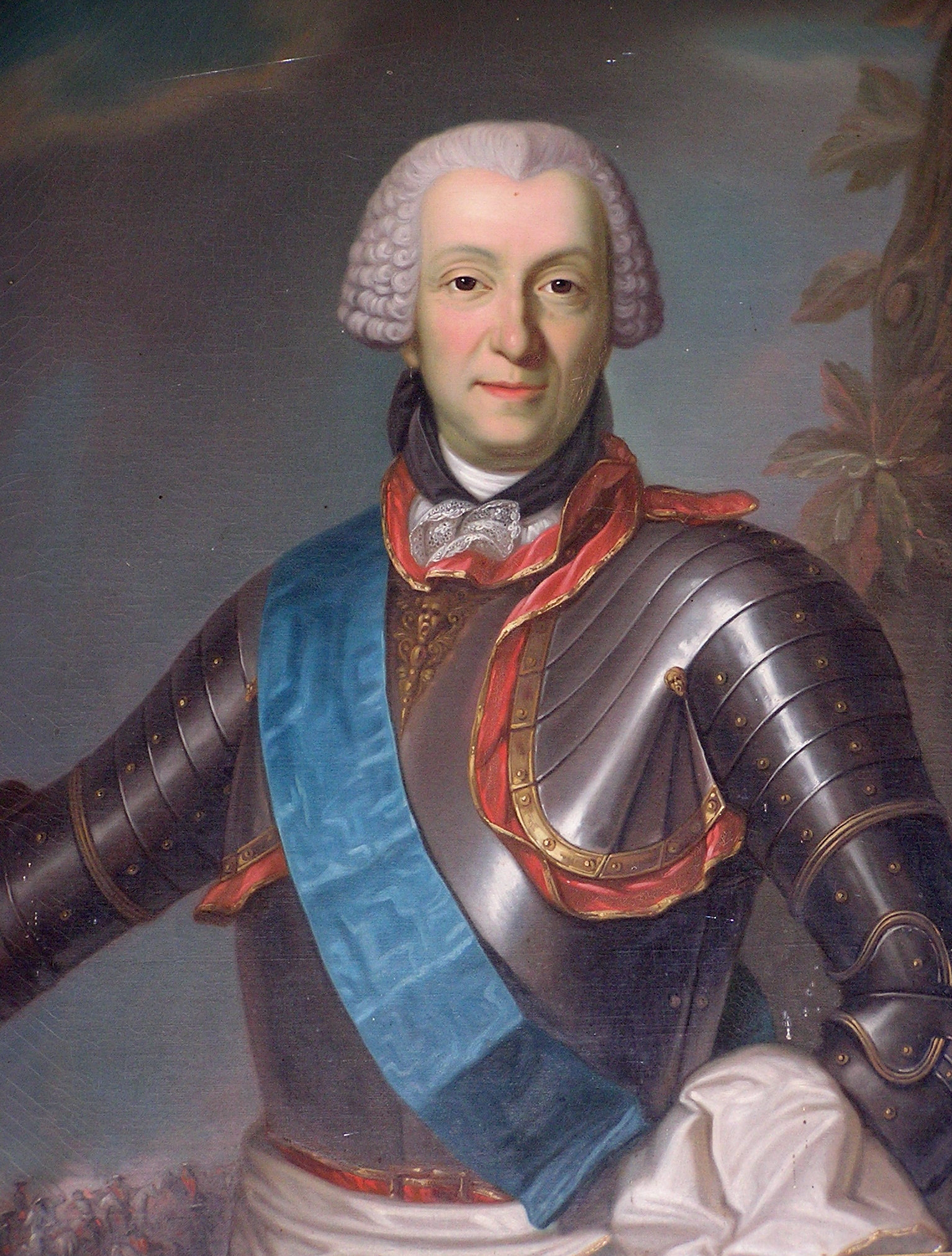
François Louis Antoine, Count of Bourbon-Busset (1722–1793)

Members of the Bourbon-Busset family later acquired the titles of count of Châlus and count of Lignières.

When the Valois-Angoulême branch on the throne was nearing its end in the 16th century, Antoine de Bourbon, Duke of Vendôme, was recognized as the premier prince du sang of France, although he only descended from James I, Count of La Marche (1319–1362), the younger brother of Peter I, Duke of Bourbon (from whom the Bourbon-Bussets descend in the male line).

== Modern era ==
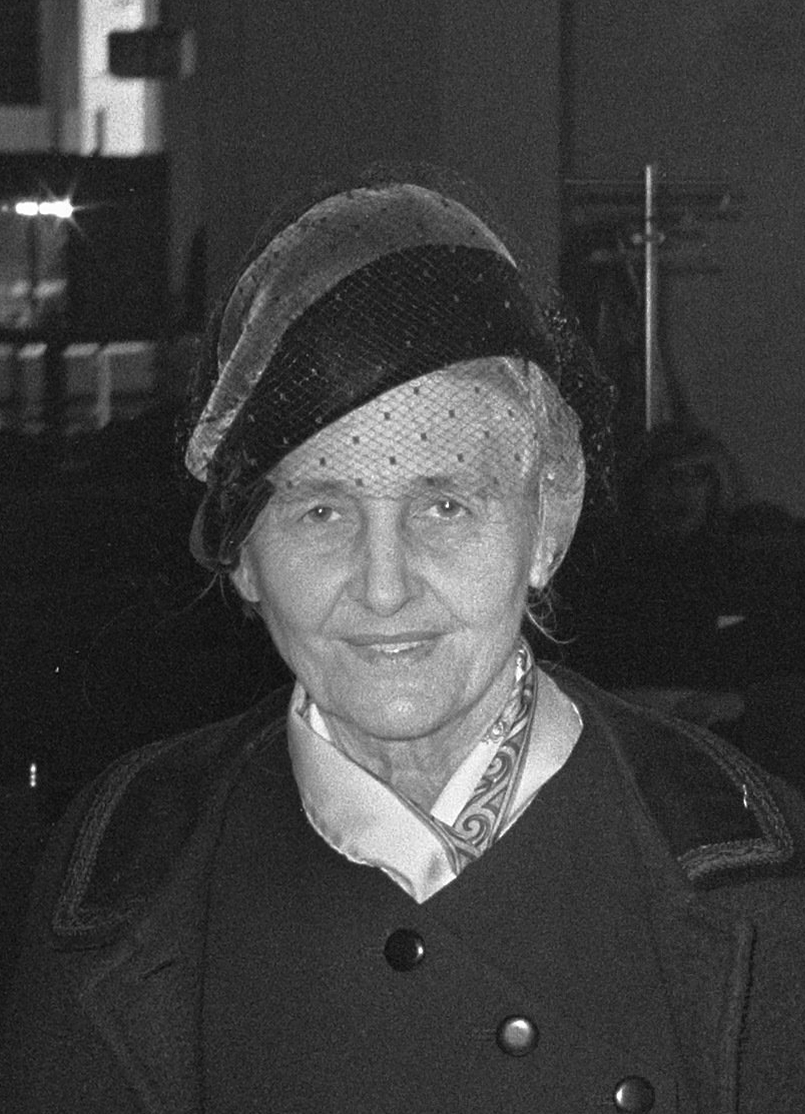
Madeleine de Bourbon-Busset (1898–1984), Duchess of Parma

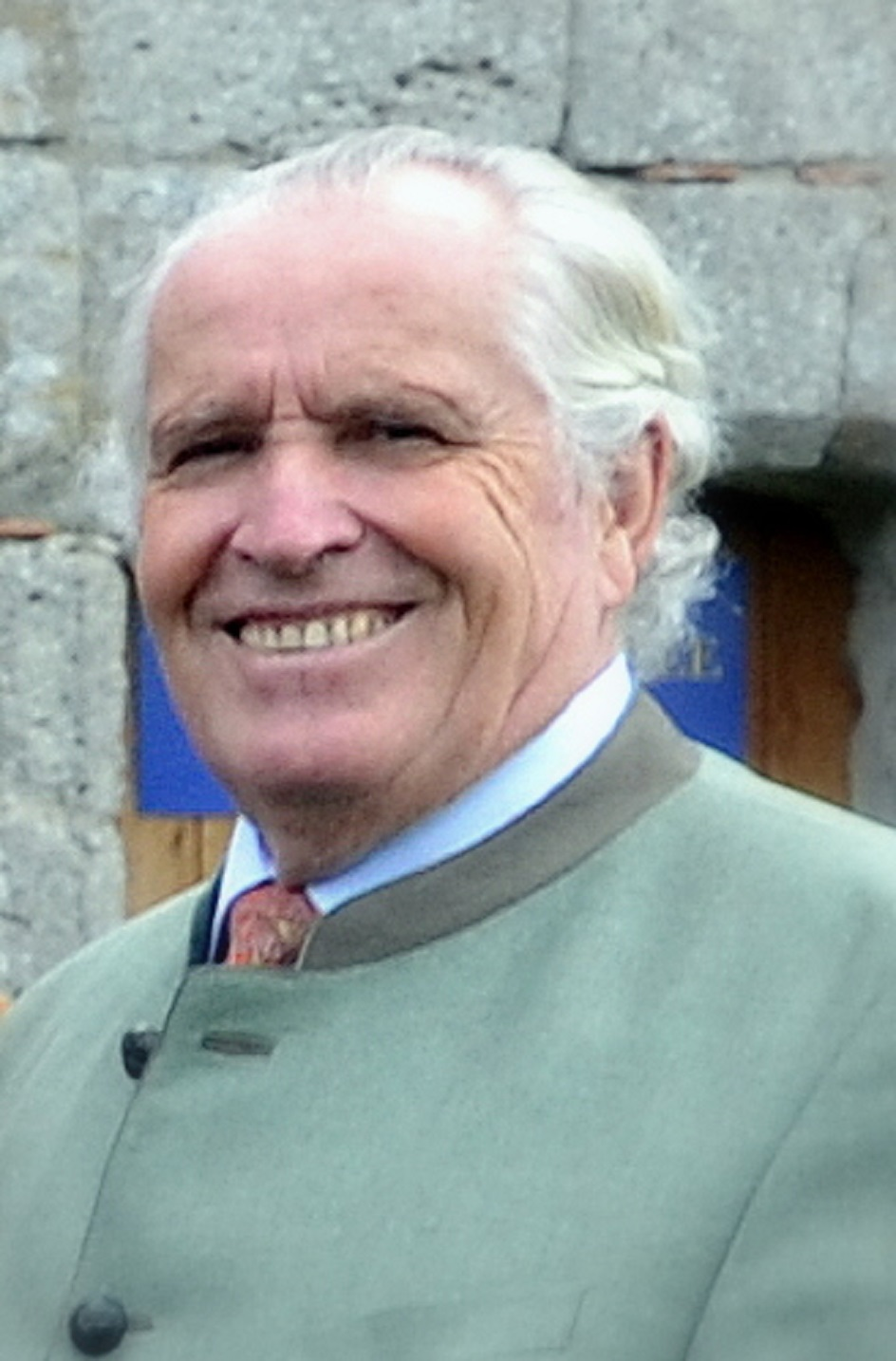
Charles de Bourbon-Busset (born 1945)

Modern arms of the family

Madeleine de Bourbon-Busset (1898–1984), daughter of the count of Lignières, is a great-great-granddaughter of Jacques, youngest son of the 8th Count of Busset (1722–1793), making her Jacques' (the 14th count) fourth cousin once removed. She got married in 1927 with a royal Bourbon relative, Xavier, titular duke of Parma and Carlist pretender to the throne of Spain. Although Madeleine brought as dowry the chateau of Lignières, at the time this marriage was not accepted as dynastic by the titular duke, Xavier's elder brother, obtaining dynastic recognition retroactively around the time of the engagement of Xavier's eldest son to the daughter of Queen Juliana of the Netherlands in 1964.

As the wife of Xavier, Madeleine was, however, proclaimed Queen consort of Spain by the remaining Carlists in 1952. Widowed in 1977, she remained a staunch adherent of her husband's Carlist principles. She excluded her elder son from the funeral of her husband as disloyal to his father's traditionalist Carlism, recognizing instead the claim to Carlist leadership and to Lignières of her younger son, Prince Sixtus Henry of Bourbon-Parma, (self-proclaimed) Duke of Aranjuez, who continued the rivalry with his brother as Carlist pretender.

A senior male-line descendant of the Bourbon-Bussets was the French writer Jacques de Bourbon-Busset (1912–2001), member of the French Academy. President Charles de Gaulle was once quoted telling him: Had it not been for the decision of King Louis XI, you might well be head of state of France today, instead of me.

Since 2001, the head of the House of Bourbon-Busset is Charles de Bourbon, Count of Busset (born 1945), who is a civil engineer of the Ecole des Mines de Paris, and Mayor of Ballancourt-sur-Essonne (1998–2014). He is the son of Jacques de Bourbon-Busset.

== Barons and Counts of Busset ==
HOUSE OF; BOURBON
1256–1317; Robert; Count of Clermont
1279–1341; Louis I Duke of Bourbon
1310–1356; Pierre I Duke of Bourbon	1319–1362; Jacques I Count of La Marche
1337–1410; Louis II; Duke of Bourbon	1344–1393; Jean I Count of La Marche
1380–1434; Jean I Duke of Bourbon	1376–1446; Louis; Count of Vendôme
1401–1456; Charles I Duke of Bourbon	1425–1477; Jean VIII; Count of Vendôme
1438–1482; Louis de Bourbon; Bishop of Liège	1470–1495; François; Count of Vendôme
BOURBON- BUSSET
1464–1530; Pierre; Baron of Busset	1489–1537; Charles; Duke of Vendôme
1499–1557; Philippe; Baron of Busset	1515–1562; Antoine; King of Navarre
1531–1588; Claude; Count of Busset	1554–1610; Henri IV; King of France
1565–1630; César; Count of Busset	1601–1643; Louis XIII; King of France
HOUSE OF; ORLÉANS
1589–1641; Claude; Count of Busset	1597–1667; Jean-Louis; Count of Busset	1638–1715; Louis XIV; King of France	1640–1701; Philippe I Duke of Orléans
1648–1677; Louis; Count of Busset
1672–1724; Louis; Count of Busset
1722–1793; François-Louis; Count of Busset
1749–1829; Louis-François; Count of Busset
1782–1856; François-Louis; Count of Busset
1819–1897; Charles; Count of Busset	1819–1871; Gaspard; Count of Châlus
1848–1918; Robert; Count of Busset
1875–1954; Louis; Count of Busset
1912–2001; Jacques; Count of Busset
1945– Charles; Count of Busset
1976– Philippe de Bourbon-Busset

== Other illegitimate houses ==
- Bourbon-Maine (extinct)
- Bourbon-Penthièvre (extinct)
- Second house of Bourbon-Vendôme (extinct)

== Sources ==
- Poitrineau, Abel, ed. (1973). Le mémoire sur l'état de la Généralité de Riom en 1697 dresse pour l'instruction du duc de Bourgogne par l'intendant Lefevre d'Ormesson (in French). Institut D'Etudes du Massif Central.
