= Saint-Vincent-de-Paul, Gironde =

Saint-Vincent-de-Paul
- Commune
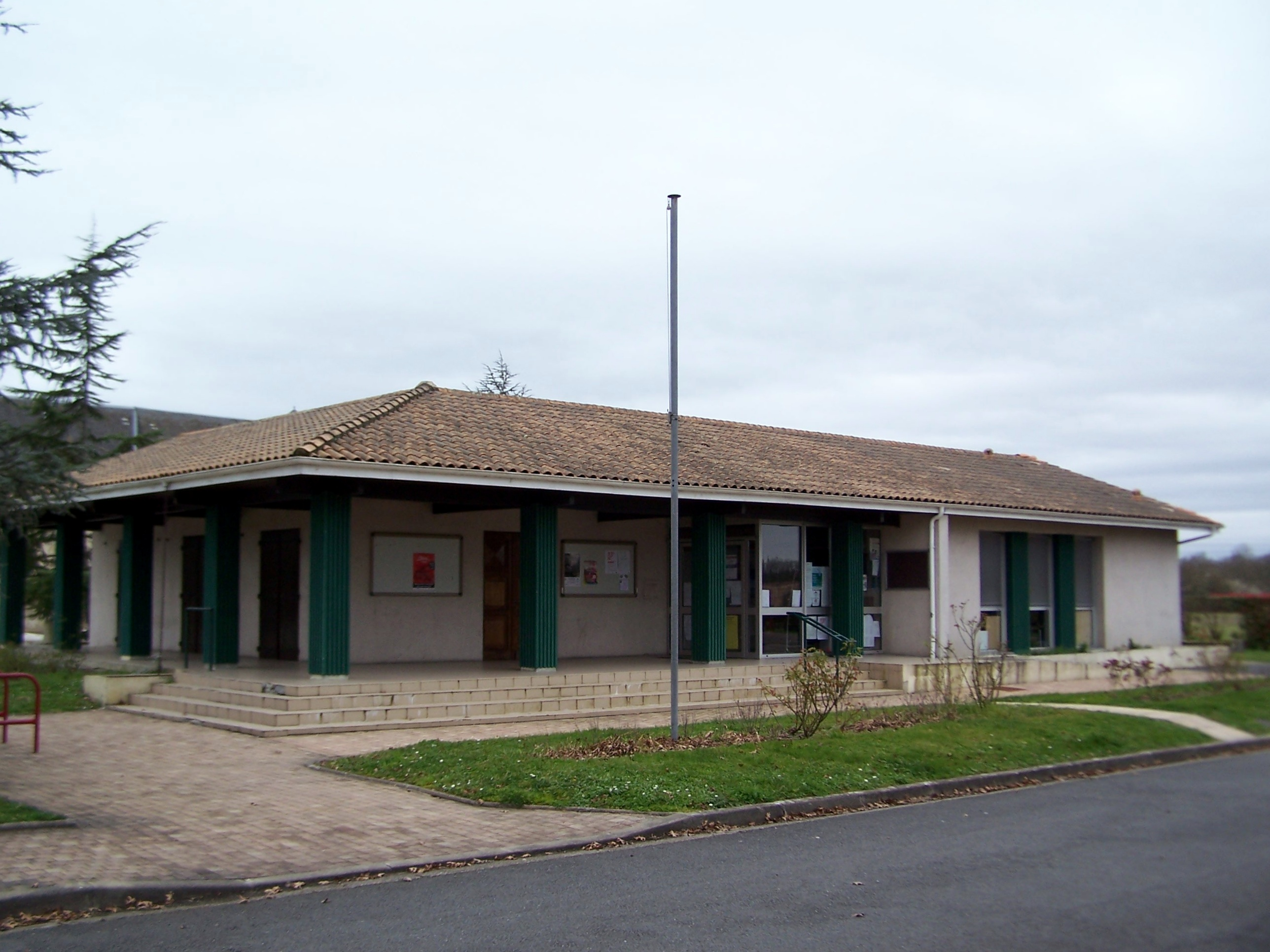
- The town hall in Saint-Vincent-de-Paul
- Location of Saint-Vincent-de-Paul
- Location within France Location within Nouvelle-Aquitaine
- Coordinates: 44°57′19″N 0°28′05″W
- Country: France
- Region: Nouvelle-Aquitaine
- Department: Gironde
- Arrondissement: Bordeaux
- Canton: La Presqu'île
- Intercommunality: Bordeaux Métropole

Government
  - Mayor (2020–2026): Max Colès
- Area^{1}: 13.88 km^{2} (5.36 sq mi)
- Elevation: 4 m (13 ft)
- Highest elevation: 8 m (26 ft)
- Lowest elevation: 1 m (3.3 ft)
- Population (2023): 1,067
  - Density: 76.87/km^{2} (199.1/sq mi)
- Time zone: UTC+01:00 (CET)
  - Summer (DST): UTC+02:00 (CEST)
- INSEE/Postal code: 33487 /33440
- ^{1} French Land Register data, which excludes lakes, ponds, glaciers > 1 km^{2} (0.386 sq mi or 247 acres) and river estuaries.

Saint-Vincent-de-Paul (French pronunciation: [sɛ̃ vɛ̃sɑ̃ də pɔl]; Occitan: Sent Vincenç de Pau) is a commune in the Gironde department in Nouvelle-Aquitaine in southwestern France.

== Population ==
Historical population
Year	Pop.	±% p.a.
1968	670	—
1975	635	−0.76%
1982	758	+2.56%
1990	963	+3.04%
1999	1,055	+1.02%
2007	1,081	+0.30%
2012	1,026	−1.04%
2017	1,007	−0.37%
2023	1,067	+0.97%
Source: INSEE

== See also ==
- Communes of the Gironde department
