= Sainte-Eulalie, Gironde =

Sainte-Eulalie
- Commune
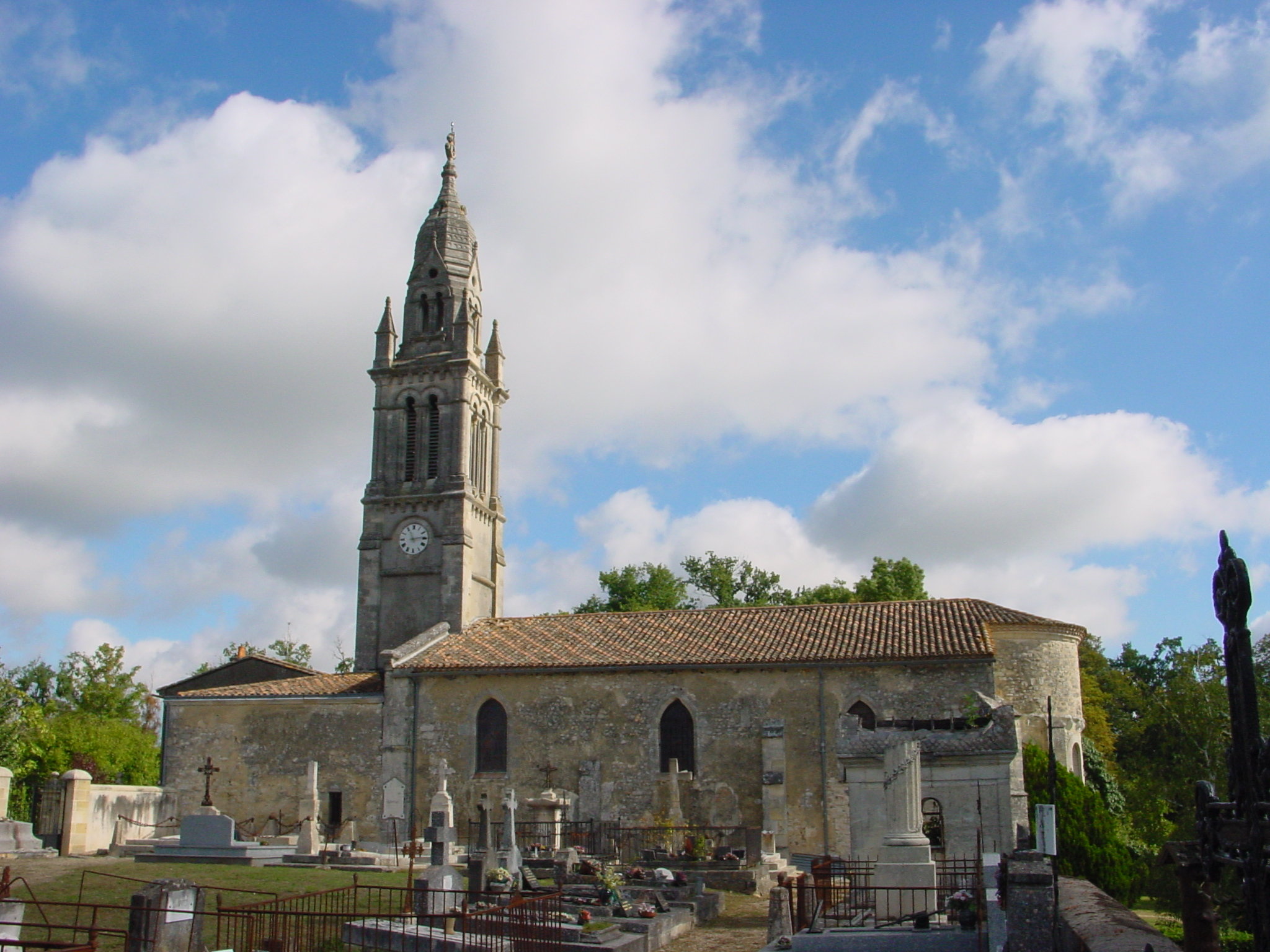
- The church in Sainte-Eulalie

- Coat of arms
- Location of Sainte-Eulalie
- Location within France Location within Nouvelle-Aquitaine
- Coordinates: 44°54′32″N 0°28′19″W
- Country: France
- Region: Nouvelle-Aquitaine
- Department: Gironde
- Arrondissement: Bordeaux
- Canton: La Presqu'île
- Intercommunality: CC Les Rives de la Laurence

Government
  - Mayor (2020–2026): Hubert Laporte
- Area^{1}: 9.06 km^{2} (3.50 sq mi)
- Elevation: 40 m (130 ft)
- Highest elevation: 60 m (200 ft)
- Lowest elevation: 10 m (33 ft)
- Population (2023): 4,915
  - Density: 542/km^{2} (1,410/sq mi)
- Time zone: UTC+01:00 (CET)
  - Summer (DST): UTC+02:00 (CEST)
- INSEE/Postal code: 33397 /33560
- ^{1} French Land Register data, which excludes lakes, ponds, glaciers > 1 km^{2} (0.386 sq mi or 247 acres) and river estuaries.

Sainte-Eulalie (French pronunciation: [sɛ̃t ølali]; Occitan: Senta Eulàlia) is a commune in the Gironde department in Nouvelle-Aquitaine in southwestern France.

== Population ==
Historical population
Year	Pop.	±% p.a.
1968	1,953	—
1975	2,633	+4.36%
1982	3,365	+3.57%
1990	3,930	+1.96%
1999	4,189	+0.71%
2007	4,786	+1.68%
2012	4,646	−0.59%
2017	4,631	−0.06%
2023	4,915	+1.00%
Source: INSEE

== See also ==
- Communes of the Gironde department
