= Florence Malbran-Labat =

French researcher

- Occupation: Philologist, orientalist
- Employer: Catholic University of Paris; French National Centre for Scientific Research; Jean Moulin University Lyon 3; Spanish National Research Council; École pratique des hautes études 4e section Sciences historiques et philologiques

Florence Malbran-Labat is a French researcher at the French National Centre for Scientific Research and former director of the École des Langues et Civilisations de l'Orient Ancien (ELCOA) at the Catholic University of Paris.

== Life ==
She is the daughter of the Assyriologist René Labat.

She taught at the École pratique des hautes études (section 4), at the Jean Moulin University Lyon 3, at the Spanish National Research Council and at the Catholic Institute of Paris.

She is a member of the Archéorient team and the Mission Archéologique Syro-Francaise de Ras Shamra-Ourgarit.

== Bibliography ==
- Malbran-Labat, Florence (1995). De Margerie, Anne; Département des antiquités orientales du musée du Louvre (eds.). Les inscriptions royales de Suse: Briques de l'époque paléo-élamite à l'empire néo-élamite. FeniXX. ISBN 2-7118-2868-9.
- Malbran-Labat, Florence (2018). "Elamite royal inscriptions". In Álvarez-Mon, Javier; Basello, Gian Pietro; Wicks, Yasmina (eds.). The Elamite World. London; New York: Routledge, Taylor and Francis Group. doi:10.4324/9781315658032. ISBN 9781315658032.
