= Pierre Basile =

12th-century French peasant boy who wounded King Richard I of England

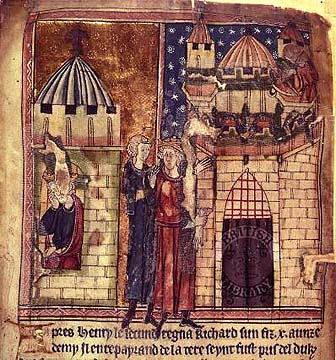
Pierre Basile (top right) shooting at Richard I

Pierre Basile (possibly died 6 April 1199), also identified in some sources as Bertran de Gourdon and John Sabroz, was a Limousin boy famous for shooting King Richard I of England with a crossbow at the siege of Châlus-Chabrol on 25 March 1199. Richard, who had removed some of his chainmail, was not mortally wounded by Basile's bolt directly; however the wound resulted in gangrene, of which Richard later died.

Basile was one of only two knights defending the castle and was renowned amongst the English attackers for his appearance: the castle was so ill-prepared for King Richard's siege that Basile was forced to defend the ramparts with cobbled-together armour and a makeshift shield constructed from a frying pan, much to the mirth of the English besiegers. It is perhaps this dismissive attitude that led to Richard taking little precaution on the day he was shot.

Upon wounding Richard, Basile was captured, after which he explained that he had sought vengeance against the king for killing his father and his two brothers. Although there are numerous variations of the story's details, it is generally agreed that King Richard ordered that Basile suffer no punishment (and, in fact, that he be paid 100 shillings). Not much is known about Basile's fate afterwards, but according to one account the mercenary soldier Mercadier disregarded Richard's orders after his death and Basile was flayed alive and then hanged.

"Peter Basili" or "Pierre Basile" is not believed to be his real name, especially since it contrasts with the names "John Sabroz" and "Bertran de Gourdon" as the name of Richard's killer. In truth, it is considered unlikely that contemporary chroniclers knew his real name.
