= Jacques de Bourbon-Busset =

French novelist, essayist and politician

Jacques de Bourbon, Count of Busset (27 April 1912, Paris – 7 May 2001, Paris) was a French novelist, essayist and politician. He was elected to the Académie française on 4 June 1981. He was a senior member of the House of Bourbon-Busset.

== Bibliography ==
- 1946 Le Sel de la terre (under the pseudonym Vincent Laborde) (Gallimard)
- 1956 Antoine, mon frère (Gallimard)
- 1957 Le Silence et la Joie (Grand Prix du roman de l'Académie française) (Gallimard)
- 1957 L’Encyclopédie française, tome XI : La vie internationale (in collaboration)
- 1958 Le remords est un luxe (Gallimard)
- 1959 Mazarin, en collaboration (Hachette)
- 1959 Fugue à deux voix (Gallimard)
- 1959 Moi, César (Gallimard)
- 1960 L’Olympien (Gallimard)
- 1960 Mémoires d’un lion (Gallimard)
- 1961 César, en collaboration (Hachette)
- 1962 Les Aveux infidèles (Gallimard)
- 1962 Alexandre, in collaboration (Hachette)
- 1963 La Grande Conférence (Gallimard)
- 1964 Paul Valéry ou le mystique sans Dieu (Plon)
- 1964 Le Protecteur (Gallimard)
- 1965 La Nuit de Salernes (Gallimard)
- 1966 La nature est un talisman (Journal I) (Gallimard)
- 1967 Les Arbres et les Jours (Journal II) (Gallimard)
- 1969 L’Amour durable (Journal III) (Gallimard)
- 1969 Homme et Femme il les créa (Fayard)
- 1971 Comme le diamant (Journal IV) (Gallimard)
- 1972 Le Jeu de la constance (Gallimard)
- 1973 Le lion bat la campagne (Gallimard)
- 1974 Le Couple en question, dialogue avec Marc Oraison (Beauchesne)
- 1974 Complices (Journal V) (Gallimard)
- 1975 Laurence de Saintonge (Gallimard)
- 1976 Au vent de la mémoire (Journal VI), (grand prix catholique de littérature) (Gallimard)
- 1978 Je n’ai peur de rien quand je suis sûr de toi (Gallimard)
- 1978 Tu ne mourras pas (Journal VII) (Gallimard)
- 1979 La Différence créatrice (Le Cerf)
- 1980 Les Choses simples (Journal VIII), (prix Marcel Proust) (Gallimard)
- 1982 La Force des jours (Journal IX) (Gallimard)
- 1983 Le Berger des nuages (Gallimard)
- 1984 L’Empire de la passion (PUF)
- 1985 Bien plus qu’aux premiers jours (Journal X) (Gallimard)
- 1987 Lettre à Laurence (Gallimard)
- 1987 Confession de Don Juan (Albin Michel)
- 1989 Laurence ou la sagesse de l’amour fou (Gallimard)
- 1990 L’Audace d’aimer (Gallimard)
- 1991 L’Instant perpétuel (Gallimard)
- 1992 Foi jurée, esprit libre (Desclée de Brouwer)
- 1993 L’Esprit de la forêt (Gallimard)
- 1995 L’Amour confiance (Gallimard)
- 1996 La Tendresse inventive (Gallimard)
- 1997 Alliance (Gallimard)
- 1999 Les ailes de l'esprit (Le Rocher)
- 2000 La raison ardente (Gallimard)
- 2002 L'absolu vécu à deux (Gallimard)
