= Beychac-et-Caillau =

- Commune
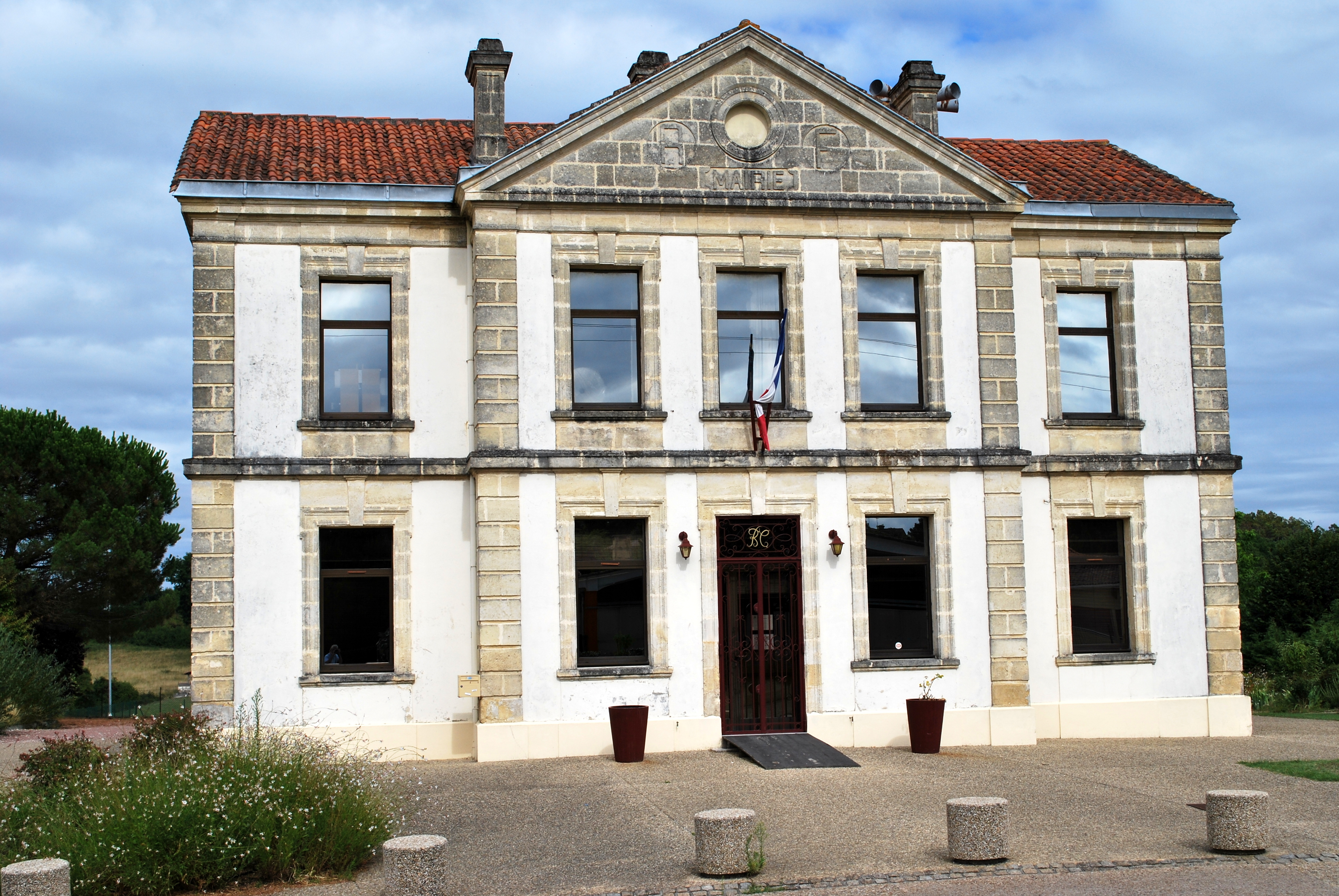
- The town hall in Beychac-et-Caillau

- Coat of arms
- Location of Beychac-et-Caillau
- Location within France Location within Nouvelle-Aquitaine
- Coordinates: 44°52′16″N 0°22′12″W
- Country: France
- Region: Nouvelle-Aquitaine
- Department: Gironde
- Arrondissement: Bordeaux
- Canton: La Presqu'île
- Intercommunality: CC Les Rives de la Laurence

Government
  - Mayor (2020–2026): Philippe Garrigue
- Area^{1}: 15.62 km^{2} (6.03 sq mi)
- Elevation: 46 m (151 ft)
- Highest elevation: 84 m (276 ft)
- Lowest elevation: 10 m (33 ft)
- Population (2023): 2,625
  - Density: 168.1/km^{2} (435.3/sq mi)
- Time zone: UTC+01:00 (CET)
  - Summer (DST): UTC+02:00 (CEST)
- INSEE/Postal code: 33049 /33750
- ^{1} French Land Register data, which excludes lakes, ponds, glaciers > 1 km^{2} (0.386 sq mi or 247 acres) and river estuaries.

Beychac-et-Caillau (French pronunciation: [bejʃak e kajo]; Occitan: Baishac e Calhau) is a commune in the Gironde department in Nouvelle-Aquitaine in southwestern France. It is a wine-producing area.

== Population ==
Historical population
Year	Pop.	±% p.a.
1968	731	—
1975	976	+4.22%
1982	1,468	+6.00%
1990	1,611	+1.17%
1999	1,782	+1.13%
2007	1,920	+0.94%
2012	2,008	+0.90%
2017	2,227	+2.09%
2023	2,625	+2.78%
Source: INSEE

== See also ==
- Communes of the Gironde department
