= Fulk of Neuilly =

French preacher of the twelfth century and priest

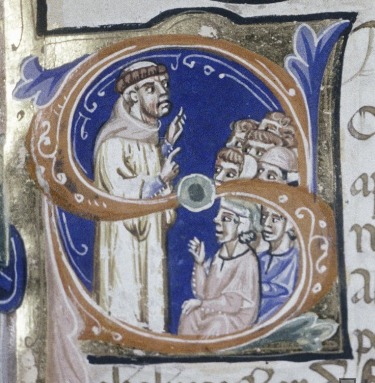

Fulk of Neuilly (also appearing in the forms "Fulke," "Foulque," "Foulques," "Fulco," "Folco," etc., and as "de Neuilly") (died 1201) was a French preacher of the twelfth century, and priest of Neuilly-sur-Marne. His preaching encouraged the Fourth Crusade. He is a beatus of the Roman Catholic Church; his feast is celebrated on March 2.

A priest at Neuilly from 1191, he attended the lectures of Peter the Chanter in Paris. He began to preach from 1195, and gained a reputation for piety and eloquence. His preaching focused on reforming people's morality and many of his denunciations were upon the sins of usury and lustfulness. Clerical concubinage was a common target of his and he would often point out priests and concubines that were guilty of this sin in the crowd when he was preaching. It was reported that he rebuked King Richard I of England by advising him to marry off his three evil daughters, his Pride, Greed, and Lechery; and that the king replied that he would marry them appropriately to the Templars, the Cistercians, and to the bishops and abbots of the Church.

An invitation for Fulk to preach a crusade came from Pope Innocent III in 1199. His preaching influenced both Simon de Montfort, 5th Earl of Leicester, and Alix de Montmorency.

Fulk's assiduous enthusiasm in carrying out his mission led to rumours concerning the usage made of the monetary sums it produced. He died shortly afterwards.

== Bibliography ==
- C. Grasso, Folco di Neuilly sacerdos et predicator crucis, dans "Nuova Rivista Storica", Anno 2010 - Volume XCIV - Fascicolo III, p. 741-764.
- Chronica Magistri Rogeri de Hovedene (ed., William Stubbs) (4 vols., Rolls series, 1868–1871) (in Latin)
- Itinerarium Kambriae (ed., James F. Dimock) available in Giraldi Cambrensis Opera: Volume VI (1868). (in Latin)
