= Saint-Sulpice-et-Cameyrac =

- Commune
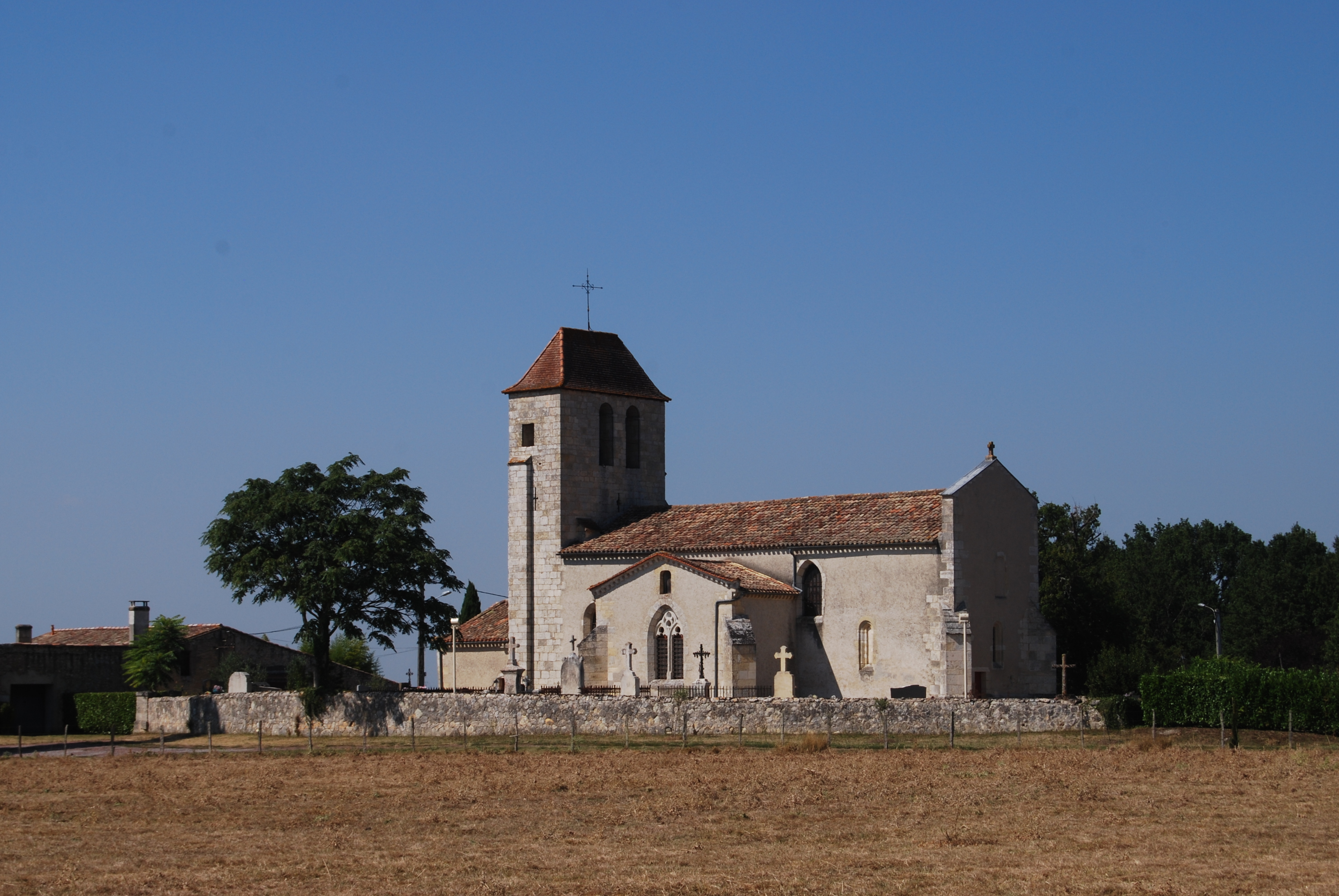
- The church in Cameyrac

- Coat of arms
- Location of Saint-Sulpice-et-Cameyrac
- Location within France Location within Nouvelle-Aquitaine
- Coordinates: 44°54′39″N 0°23′22″W
- Country: France
- Region: Nouvelle-Aquitaine
- Department: Gironde
- Arrondissement: Bordeaux
- Canton: La Presqu'île
- Intercommunality: CC Les Rives de la Laurence

Government
  - Mayor (2021–2026): Pierre Cotsas
- Area^{1}: 15.04 km^{2} (5.81 sq mi)
- Elevation: 12 m (39 ft)
- Highest elevation: 64 m (210 ft)
- Lowest elevation: 3 m (9.8 ft)
- Population (2023): 4,881
  - Density: 324.5/km^{2} (840.5/sq mi)
- Time zone: UTC+01:00 (CET)
  - Summer (DST): UTC+02:00 (CEST)
- INSEE/Postal code: 33483 /33450
- ^{1} French Land Register data, which excludes lakes, ponds, glaciers > 1 km^{2} (0.386 sq mi or 247 acres) and river estuaries.

Saint-Sulpice-et-Cameyrac (French pronunciation: [sɛ̃ sylpis e kameʁak]; Gascon: Sent Sulpici e Camairac) is a commune in the Gironde department in Nouvelle-Aquitaine in southwestern France.

== Population ==
Historical population
Year	Pop.	±% p.a.
1968	1,406	—
1975	1,936	+4.68%
1982	3,215	+7.51%
1990	3,520	+1.14%
1999	3,932	+1.24%
2007	4,235	+0.93%
2012	4,485	+1.15%
2017	4,614	+0.57%
2023	4,881	+0.94%
Source: INSEE

== See also ==
- Communes of the Gironde department
