= Châlus =

- Commune
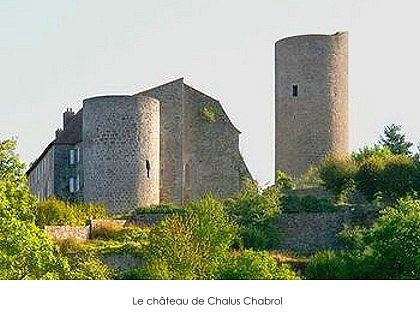
- The château of Châlus Chabrol

- Coat of arms
- Location of Châlus
- Location within France Location within Nouvelle-Aquitaine
- Coordinates: 45°39′21″N 0°58′53″E
- Country: France
- Region: Nouvelle-Aquitaine
- Department: Haute-Vienne
- Arrondissement: Limoges
- Canton: Saint-Yrieix-la-Perche

Government
  - Mayor (2020–2026): Alain Brézaudy
- Area^{1}: 27.98 km^{2} (10.80 sq mi)
- Highest elevation: 444 m (1,457 ft)
- Lowest elevation: 310 m (1,020 ft)
- Population (2023): 1,683
  - Density: 60.15/km^{2} (155.8/sq mi)
- Time zone: UTC+01:00 (CET)
  - Summer (DST): UTC+02:00 (CEST)
- INSEE/Postal code: 87032 /87230
- ^{1} French Land Register data, which excludes lakes, ponds, glaciers > 1 km^{2} (0.386 sq mi or 247 acres) and river estuaries.

Châlus (French pronunciation: [ʃaly]; Occitan: Chasluç) is a commune in the Haute-Vienne department in the Nouvelle-Aquitaine region in western France.

== History ==
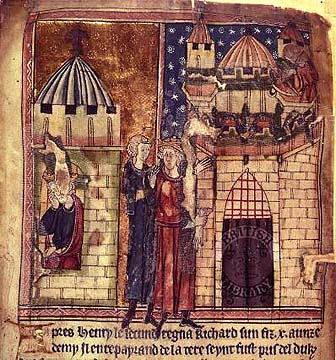
Richard I of England lethally hurt in Châlus (right)

Richard I, King of England was besieging Châlus in 1199 when Pierre Basile wounded him with a crossbow bolt; Richard died of the wound.

In 1275–1280, Géraud de Maumont built a second castle, Châlus Maulmont, in front of Châlus Chabrol. Chateau Châlus Maulmont was damaged extensively during the French Revolution, and was dismantled in 1790, then used as a prison. The tower of Châlus Maulmont collapsed on 20 March 1994.

By 1745, the first map, in the 1/8628th, of Châlus is established to appear in the atlas of Trudaine for the majority of Limoges, with the portion of road at the level of La-Ribière going to Châlus of the Big road from Limoges to Périgueux and with the portion of road reaching the majority of Périgord.

During the First World War, in 1917, American troops stationed in Chalus and maintained contacts with the population. Tradition reports that the American soldiers dynamited the rock of Richard Heart of Lion in order to bring back a portion in the United States. She also reports that an Alsatian refugee provoked a public scandal by addressing the one who had just attempted her reputation: Dare once to repeat that you saw me beat by an American!

T. E. Lawrence, who would later be known as Lawrence of Arabia, celebrated his 20th birthday at the former Grand Hôtel du Midi, Place de la Fountain, on 16 August 1908, whilst tracing the route of Richard I of England, on a cycling tour of France in preparation for his thesis: The Influence of the crusades on the European military architecture at the end of the XIIth century.

Châlus constitutes the framework or the geographical reference of novels and essays, such as Women who fall from Pierre Desproges, or Quadrille on the tower of Georges-Emmanuel Clancier. She is also quoted in Robert Margerit's Land of Wolves, as well as in Volume 7, When a King Loses France, Cursed Kings of Maurice Druon or in the Richard Lionheart of Walter Scott. Twice, in 1976 and 2010, the Hollywood cinema evokes Chalus. The film La Rose et la Flèche / Robin and Marian (1976), with Sean Connery and Audrey Hepburn, opens on the siege of Châlus by Richard Cœur de Lion, played by Richard Harris. The first few minutes of Ridley Scott's Robin Hood, with Russell Crowe and Cate Blanchett, opening the 2010 Cannes Film Festival, restore the battle of Châlus.

== Regional Nature Park Périgord-Limousin ==
Châlus is located in the Périgord-Limousin Regional Nature Park, a public establishment created in 1998 to protect and develop a large rural area with 50,500 inhabitants over 180,000 hectares and which includes 78 municipalities (More than one "associated territory", the lakes of Haute-Charente), two départements (Dordogne and Haute-Vienne), and formerly two regions, Aquitaine and Limousin, merged into one in 2016: Nouvelle-Aquitaine. According to its two fundamental principles "Better living on a quality territory" and "Better living through controlled development", the park aims to protect and enhance the natural, cultural and human heritage of its territory by implementing a policy Development and economic, social and cultural development. Its actions are also aimed at enhancing local resources with a view to sustainable development, improving the quality of water and hydrosystems at the level of the three headlands of the Périgord-Limousin watersheds, preserving the Biodiversity and the fight against global warming. The headquarters of this public establishment, which endeavors to boost the identity and social ties of the Périgord-Limousin region, is located in the Mas-Nadaud castle in Pageas.

== Sights ==
Châlus has a castle named Château de Châlus-Chabrol and a ruined castle named Château de Châlus-Maulmont.

Richard's entrails are still preserved in the chapel, and there is a medieval garden. Other attractions of the village include a museum dedicated to the chestnut.

The biggest Giant sequoia (Sequoiadendron giganteum) in Europe, with a circumference of 13.3 m, is in a private garden.

Inhabitants are known as Chalusiens.

== Personalities ==
- Aymery of Châlus (died 31 October 1349 in Avignon), canon of the chapter of Limoges Cathedral in 1314, archbishop of Ravenna in 1322, then bishop of Chartres in 1332, cardinal in 1342, named legate in Lombardy in 1342, then in Romagna, Corsica, Sardinia, then in Sicily where he steered 2-year-old in the name of the pope, was born in Châlus.
- Pierre de Châlus (died in February 1352), abbot of Cluny.
- Robert de Châlus (killed in the battle of Poitiers on 19 September 1356).
- Louis I of Bourbon count of Busset, baron of Busset, Châlus, Vésignieux, Saint-Martin-du-Puy (born on 18 October 1648; killed in the siége of Fribourg on 10 November 1677).
- Gaspard-Louis de Bourbon, count of Châlus (born on 16 May 1745; died in Bets on 8 December 1751, interred in the cathedral Notre-Dame de Paris).
- Pierre Desproges
- Jean-Claude Peyronnet, born on 7 November 1940 in Châlus, is a French politician.
- Nathanaël de Rincquesen, born Nathanaël de Willecot de Rincquesen on 9 March 1972 in Paris, is a French journalist and television presenter with strong ties to Châlus in Limousin
- Georges-Emmanuel Clancier, (1914) – Writer, poet, several works refer to Châlus (Terres de mémoires, Quadrille sur la tour, L'Enfant double, etc.)
- Thomas Edward Lawrence, known as Lawrence of Arabia (1888–1935) – Preparing his thesis on The Influence of the Crusades in European Military Architecture at the End of the Twelfth Century, celebrated his 20th birthday, 16 August 1908, in The old Grand Hôtel du midi174, during his tour of France by bicycle

Raymond de Châlus takes part in the first crusade of Saint Louis in 1250.

== See also ==
- Communes of the Haute-Vienne department
