= Busset =

- Commune
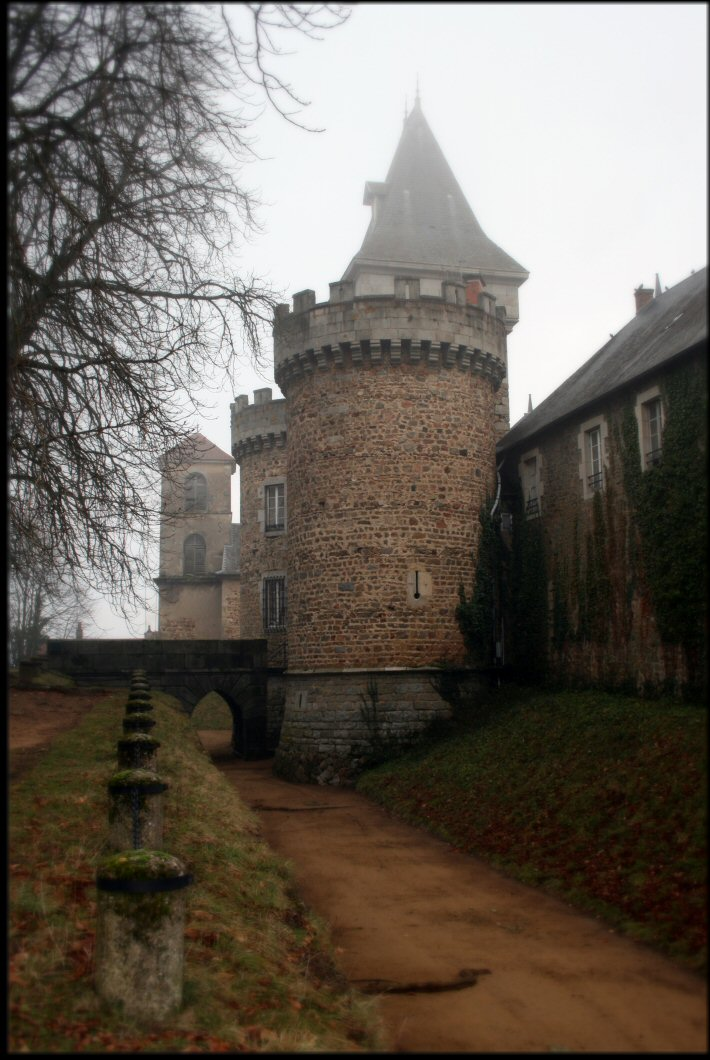
- The château in Busset
- Location of Busset
- Location within France Location within Auvergne-Rhône-Alpes
- Coordinates: 46°03′46″N 3°30′48″E
- Country: France
- Region: Auvergne-Rhône-Alpes
- Department: Allier
- Arrondissement: Vichy
- Canton: Lapalisse
- Intercommunality: CA Vichy Communauté

Government
  - Mayor (2026–32): Christine Magnaud
- Area^{1}: 36.96 km^{2} (14.27 sq mi)
- Elevation: 500 m (1,600 ft)
- Highest elevation: 608 m (1,995 ft)
- Lowest elevation: 265 m (869 ft)
- Population (2023): 850
  - Density: 23/km^{2} (60/sq mi)
- Time zone: UTC+01:00 (CET)
  - Summer (DST): UTC+02:00 (CEST)
- INSEE/Postal code: 03045 /03270
- ^{1} French Land Register data, which excludes lakes, ponds, glaciers > 1 km^{2} (0.386 sq mi or 247 acres) and river estuaries.

Busset is a commune in the Allier department in central France.

== Population ==
Historical population

Year	Pop.	±% p.a.
1793	1,442	—
1800	1,480	+0.37%
1806	1,432	−0.55%
1821	1,419	−0.06%
1831	1,689	+1.76%
1836	1,700	+0.13%
1841	1,691	−0.11%
1846	1,676	−0.18%
1851	1,737	+0.72%
1856	1,647	−1.06%
1861	1,736	+1.06%
1866	1,738	+0.02%
1872	1,692	−0.45%
1876	1,738	+0.67%
1881	1,710	−0.32%
1886	1,733	+0.27%
1891	1,775	+0.48%
1896	1,680	−1.09%
1901	1,666	−0.17%

Year	Pop.	±% p.a.
1906	1,567	−1.22%
1911	1,506	−0.79%
1921	1,314	−1.35%
1926	1,228	−1.34%
1931	1,130	−1.65%
1936	1,075	−0.99%
1946	958	−1.15%
1954	963	+0.07%
1962	976	+0.17%
1968	914	−1.09%
1975	820	−1.54%
1982	853	+0.57%
1990	881	+0.40%
1999	852	−0.37%
2007	863	+0.16%
2012	853	−0.23%
2017	910	+1.30%
2023	850	−1.13%

Source: EHESS and INSEE

== See also ==
- Communes of the Allier department
