= Adinolfo Lucchesi-Palli, 10th Prince of Campofranco =

Don Adinolfo Lucchesi-Palli
- 10th Prince of Campofranco; 5th Duke of Grazia
- Born: 10 March 1840; Graz, Austria-Hungary
- Died: 4 February 1911 (aged 70); Brunnsee Castle, Brunnsee, Austria
- Noble family: Lucchesi-Palli
- Spouse: Princess Lucrezia Nicoletta Sasso-Ruffo (m. 1860; died 1911)
- Issue: Enrico Lucchesi-Palli, 11th Prince of Campofranco; Carlo Lucchesi-Palli, 12th Prince of Campofranco
- Father: Ettore Lucchesi-Palli, 4th Duke of Grazia
- Mother: Princess Marie-Caroline of Bourbon-Two Sicilies

Maria Adinolfo Leopoldo Antonio Ettore Lucchesi-Palli, 10th Prince of Campofranco, 5th Duke of Grazia (10 March 1840 – 4 February 1911) was an Italian nobleman who was a founding member of the International Olympic Committee in 1894.

== Early life ==
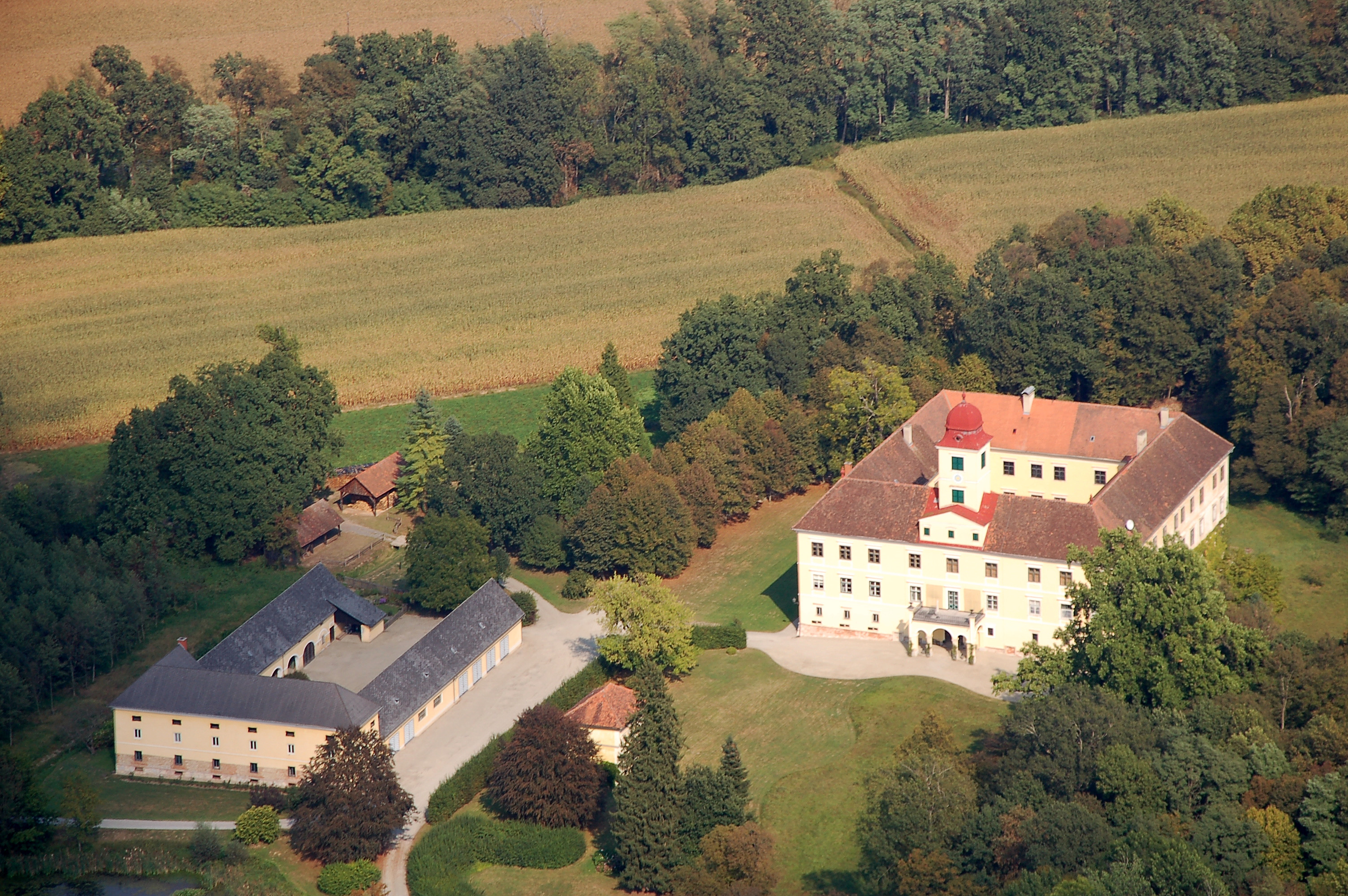
Brunnsee Castle

Adinolfo was born on 10 March 1840 at Brunnsee Castle in Graz in Austria-Hungary, into the Lucchese-Palli family, an old Italian noble family. He was the only son of Ettore Lucchesi-Palli, 4th Duke of Grazia (1806–1864) and Princess Marie-Caroline of Bourbon-Two Sicilies. His sister, Donna Francesca Lucchesi-Palli, married Carlo Camillo Massimo, 3rd Prince of Arsoli, while another, Donna Maria Isabella Lucchesi-Palli, married Maximilien, Marquis of Cavriani, and, after his death, Count Giovanni Battista de Conti. His mother had previously been married to Prince Charles Ferdinand, Duke of Berry, a member of the French royal family, who was assassinated in 1820. From that marriage, he had two half-siblings, Princess Louise Marie Thérèse and Henri, Count of Chambord. Shortly after his parents' marriage, his mother led an unsuccessful rebellion against King Louis-Philippe I to install Henri on the French throne.

His paternal grandparents were Antonio Lucchesi-Palli, 7th Prince of Campofranco, 3rd Duke of Grazia, and Anna Maria Francisca Paola Pignatelli Tagliavia d'Aragona. His nephew, Prince Fabrizio Massimo di Roviano, married Princess Beatrice of Bourbon, daughter of the Carlist Pretender Don Carlos, Duke of Madrid and Princess Margherita of Bourbon-Parma. His maternal grandparents were King Francis I of the Two Sicilies and Archduchess Maria Clementina of Austria. (Note: His grandmother, Archduchess Maria Clementina of Austria, was the tenth child and third daughter of Leopold II, Holy Roman Emperor, and Maria Luisa of Spain.) Through his mother, he was a nephew of Luisa Carlotta, Infanta of Spain, Maria Cristina, Queen of Spain, Ferdinand II, King of the Two Sicilies, Carlo Ferdinando, Prince of Capua, Prince Leopoldo, Count of Siracusa, Maria Antonia, Grand Duchess of Tuscany, Prince Antonio, Count of Lecce, Maria Amalia, Infanta of Portugal and Spain, Princess Maria Carolina, Countess of Montemolín, Teresa Cristina, Empress of Brazil, Prince Luigi, Count of Aquila, and Prince Francesco, Count of Trapani.

== Career ==
Upon the death of his father on 1 April 1864, he succeeded as the 10th Prince of Campofranco and 5th Duke of Grazia.

In keeping with family tradition, Adinolfo entered the diplomatic service of the Kingdom of Italy. As the eldest son, his primary job was initially to manage the Brunnsee Castle estate and the Weinburg am Saßbach Castle estate. When the International Olympic Committee was founded in Paris in 1894, he was Vice consul at the Italian embassy in Paris. Since founder Pierre de Coubertin wanted about half the members to be of high standing and half to be sports experts from as many different countries as possible, Adinolfo fit the bill. Since the Italian Gymnastics Federation, which had been invited to the founding Congress, could not travel for financial reasons, Lucchesi-Palli represented Italian interests. He also joined the IOC on the condition that he would be allowed to present a suitable successor at the next opportunity. Therefore, his membership in the IOC lasted only three months before he presented Riccardo Carafa della Stadera, who succeeded him.

Lucchesi-Palli was awarded the Grand Cross of the Order of Malta.

== Personal life ==
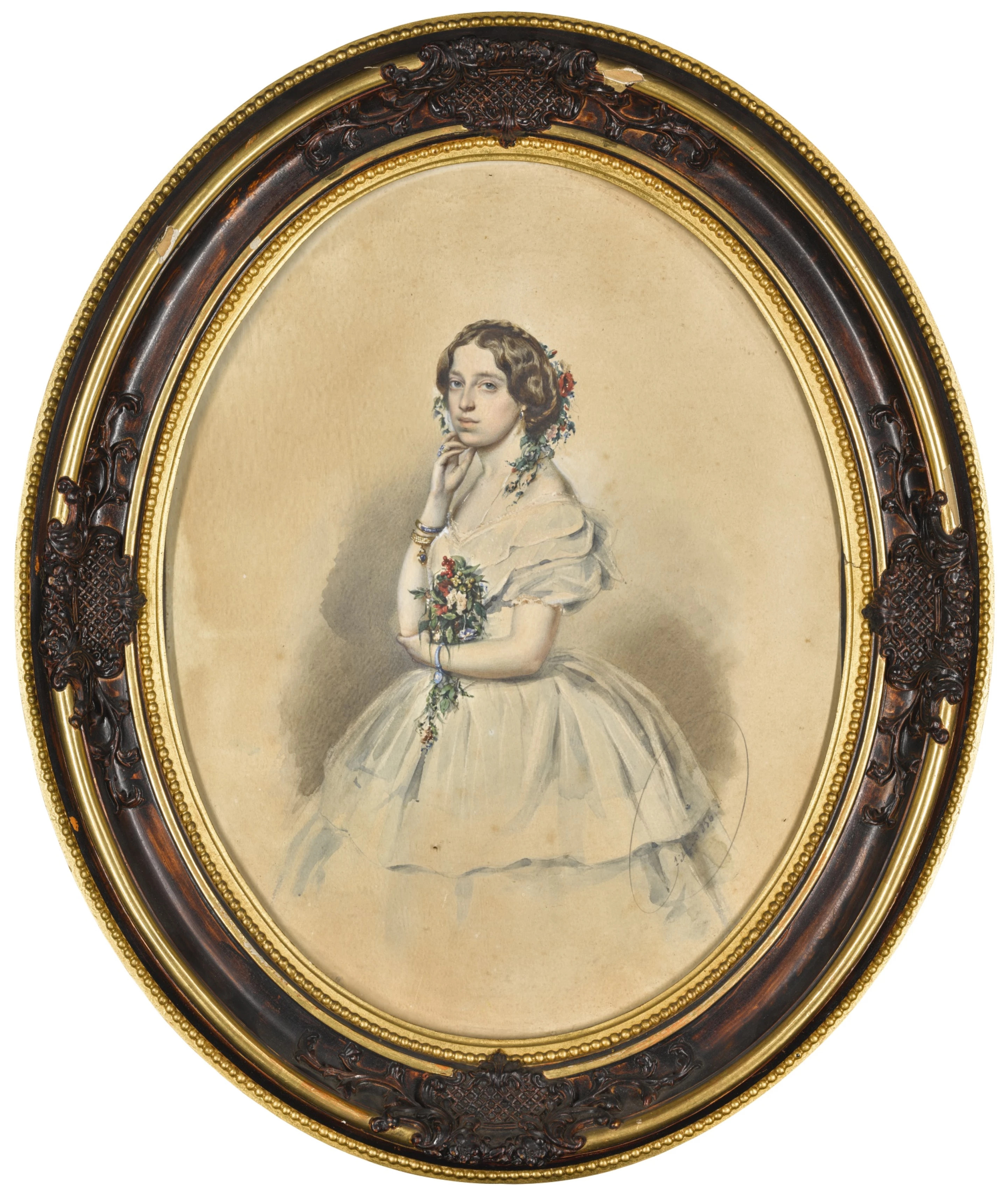
Portrait of his wife, Princess Lucrezia Nicoletta Sasso-Ruffo, by Leopold Fischer, 1864

On 7 October 1860 at Brunnsee, Adinolfo was married to Princess Lucrezia Nicoletta Sasso-Ruffo, the daughter of Vincenzo Ruffo, 12th Duke of Bagnara and Sarah Louisa Strachan (a daughter of Sir Richard Strachan, 6th Baronet). Her younger brother was Prince Ruffo, the head of Motta-Bagnara branch. Together, they were the parents of:

- Enrico Lucchesi-Palli, 11th Prince of Campofranco (1861–1924), who married Maria Rainiera, 1st Countess of Waideck, the daughter of Archduke Heinrich Anton of Austria (a son of Archduke Rainer and Princess Elisabeth of Savoy) and his morganatic wife, Leopoldine Hofmann (who had been created Baroness von Waideck), in 1892. (Note: Maria Rainiera, who had been created, suo jure, 1st Countess of Waideck in the Austrian nobility in 1892, was also the niece of Archduchess Adelaide, who married King Victor Emmanuel II of Italy.)
- Donna Maria Renata Lucchesi-Palli (1862–1943), who married Edward Onslow Moore in 1901.
- Donna Bianca Lucchesi-Palli (1865–1943), who married Prince Georg of Salm-Reifferscheidt-Krautheim, a son of Leopold, 4th Prince of Salm-Reifferscheidt-Krautheim, who inherited Dyck Castle, and Anna Maria von Thurn und Valsassina; Prince Georg was the younger brother of Alfred, 5th Prince of Salm-Reifferscheidt-Krautheim.
- Carlo Lucchesi-Palli, 12th Prince of Campofranco (1868–1951), who married Countess Sidonie von Fünfkirchen, a daughter of Count Ferdinand von Fünfkirchen zu Chlumetz, in 1893. After her death in 1902, he married Princess Henriette of Salm-Salm, a daughter of Alfred, 7th Prince of Salm-Salm and Countess Rosa von Lützow (sister of Counts Francis and Heinrich von Lützow).
- Don Pietro Lucchesi-Pailli, Count of Lucchesi-Pailli (1870–1939), he married his half-first cousin, once removed, Princess Béatrice of Parma, daughter of Robert I, Duke of Parma and Princess Maria Pia of Bourbon-Two Sicilies. (Note: Princess Maria Pia of Bourbon-Two Sicilies was the daughter of King Ferdinand II, the younger half-brother of Count Pietro's mother, Princess Marie-Caroline of Bourbon-Two Sicilies.)
- Donna Caroline Lucchesi-Palli (1872–1905), who married Count Rudolf von Enzenberg zum Freyen und Jöchelsthurn, in 1899.
- Donna Gabrielle Lucchesi-Palli (1875–1937), who married Girolamo Brandolini d'Adda, a member of the Brandolini family, in 1898.

Prince Adinolfo died on 4 February 1911 at Brunnsee Castle and was succeeded in his titles by his eldest son, Enrico.

=== Descendants ===
Through his eldest son Enrico, he was a grandfather of Donna Maria Renata Lucchesi-Palli del Principi di Campofranco (1895–1976), who married Count Siegfried von Küenburg, a son of Count Wilhelm von Küenburg and Baroness Marianne Matz von Spiegelfeld, in 1922.
