= Enrico Lucchesi-Palli, 11th Prince of Campofranco =

Enrico Lucchesi-Palli
- 11th Prince of Campofranco; 6th Duke of Grazia
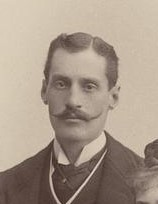
- Born: 18 August 1861; Brunnsee Castle, Brunnsee, Austria
- Died: 1 August 1924 (aged 62); Sallegg Castle, Kaltern, South Tyrol
- Noble family: Lucchesi-Palli
- Spouse: Countess Maria Rainiera von Waideck (m. 1892; died 1924)
- Issue: Donna Maria Renata Lucchesi-Palli
- Father: Adinolfo Lucchesi-Palli, 10th Prince of Campofranco
- Mother: Princess Lucrezia Nicoletta Sasso-Ruffo

Enrico Lucchesi-Palli, 11th Prince of Campofranco, 6th Duke of Grazia (19 August 1861 – 1 August 1924) was an Italian nobleman.

== Early life ==
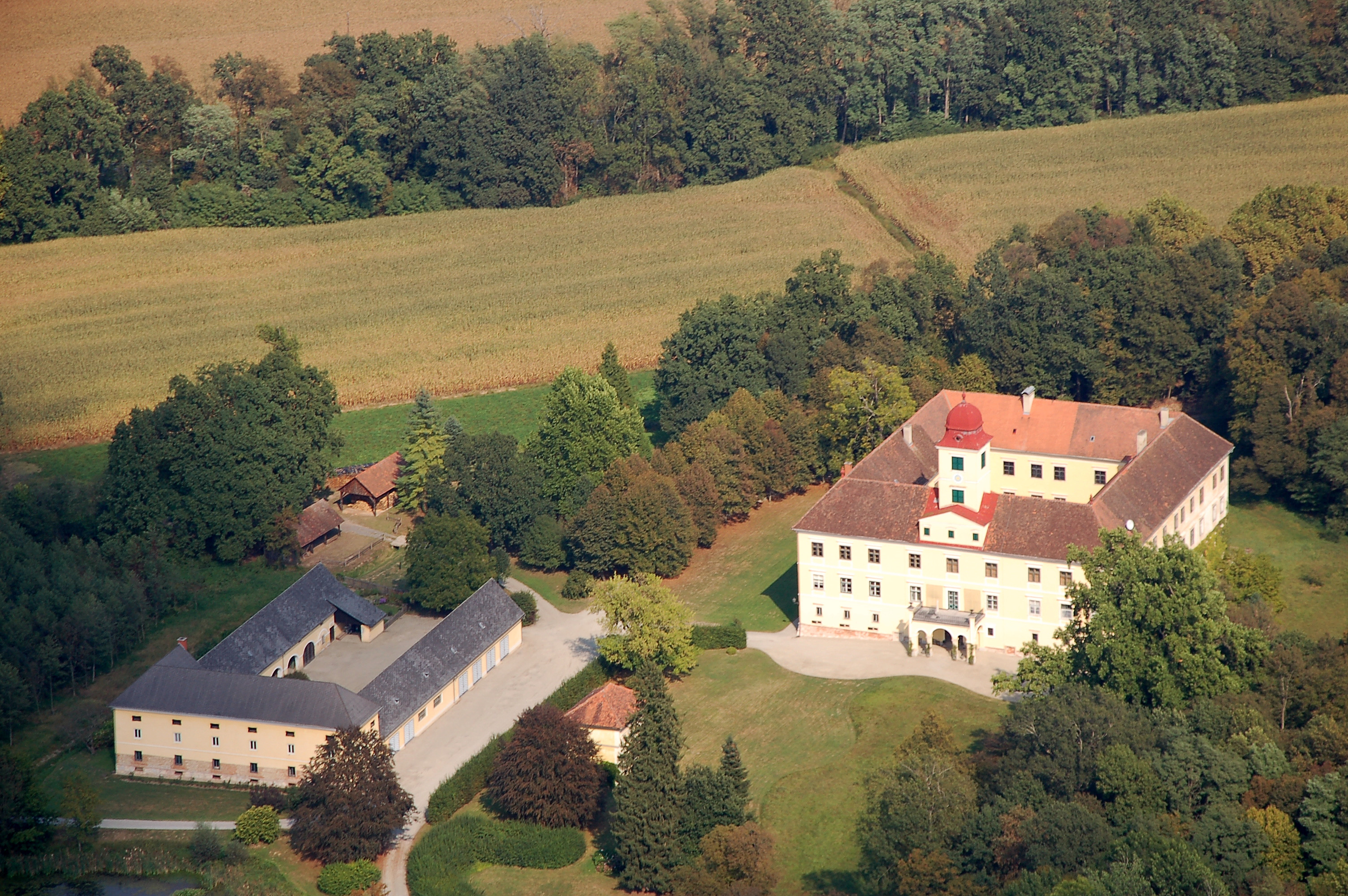
Brunnsee Castle

Enrico was born on 19 August 1861 at Brunnsee Castle in Brunnsee, near Graz in Austria, into the Lucchese-Palli family, an old Italian noble family. He was the eldest son of Don Adinolfo Lucchesi-Palli, 10th Prince of Campofranco (1840–1911) and Princess Lucrezia Nicoletta Sasso-Ruffo dei principi di Sant' Antimo. Among his siblings were Carlo Lucchesi-Palli, Pietro Lucchesi-Pailli, and Gabrielle Lucchesi-Palli (who married Girolamo Brandolini d'Adda, a member of the Brandolini family).

His paternal grandparents were Ettore Lucchesi-Palli, 4th Duke of Grazia and Princess Marie-Caroline of Bourbon-Two Sicilies (Note: His grandmother, Princess Marie-Caroline of Bourbon-Two Sicilies, was the daughter of King Francis I of the Two Sicilies and Archduchess Maria Clementina of Austria (the tenth child and third daughter of Leopold II, Holy Roman Emperor, and Maria Luisa of Spain). A member of the House of Bourbon, from her first marriage to Prince Charles Ferdinand, Duke of Berry, a member of the French royal family, she was the mother of Princess Louise Marie Thérèse and Henri, Count of Chambord. Shortly after his grandparents' marriage, she led an unsuccessful rebellion against King Louis-Philippe I to install her son Henri on the French throne.) One aunt, Donna Francesca Lucchesi-Palli, married Carlo Camillo Massimo, 3rd Prince of Arsoli, while another, Donna Maria Isabella Lucchesi-Palli, married Maximilien, Marquis of Cavriani, and, after his death, Count Giovanni Battista de Conti. His first cousin, Countess Maria Graziella Zileri dal Verme, married the Jaime Segismundo Álvares Pereira de Melo, the 8th Duke of Cadaval (head of junior Miguelist branch of the House of Braganza). Another first cousin, Prince Fabrizio Massimo di Roviano, married the Princess Beatrice of Bourbon, daughter of the Carlist Pretender Carlos of Bourbon and Princess Margherita of Bourbon-Parma. His maternal grandparents were Vincenzo Ruffo, 12th Duke of Bagnara and Sarah Louisa Strachan (a daughter of Sir Richard Strachan, 6th Baronet). His mother was the older sister of the Prince Ruffo, the head of Motta-Bagnara branch.

== Career ==
Upon the death of his father in 1911, he succeeded as the 11th Prince of Campofranco and 6th Duke of Grazia.

In 1900, his wife had her grandfather's castle in Kaltern, Sallegg Castle (which Archduke Rainer had acquired in 1851), rebuilt according to plans by the renowned Viennese architect, Anton Weber, into a palace with a lavish garden and courtyard.

== Personal life ==
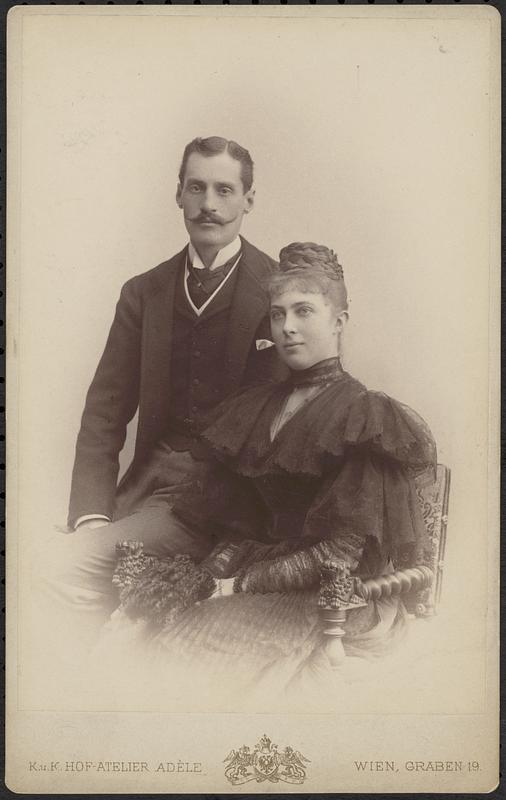
Photograph of the Prince and his wife, Rainiera, c. 1895

On 26 July 1892 in Vienna, Lucchesi-Palli was married to Maria Rainiera, Countess of Waideck (1872–1936), the daughter of Archduke Heinrich Anton of Austria (a son of Archduke Rainer and Princess Elisabeth of Savoy) and his morganatic wife, Leopoldine Hofmann (who had been created Baroness von Waideck). Her aunt, Archduchess Adelaide, married King Victor Emmanuel II of Italy. Maria Rainiera had been created, suo jure, 1st Countess of Waideck in the Austrian nobility in 1892. Together, they were the parents of:

- Donna Maria Renata Lucchesi-Palli del Principi di Campofranco (1895–1976), who married Count Siegfried von Küenburg, a son of Count Wilhelm von Küenburg and Baroness Marianne Matz von Spiegelfeld, in 1922.

Prince Enrico died on 1 August 1924 at their home, Sallegg Castle in Kaltern, South Tyrol. As he had no male issue, the title passed to his younger brother, Carlo, who became the 12th Prince and 7th Duke. His widow died at Gries bei Bozen on 17 February 1936.
