= Lucchese-Palli =

Italian noble family

Lucchese-Palli Italian: Casa di Lucchese-Palli
- Sicilian noble family
- Country: Italy Former countries: Kingdom of Sicily; Papal States; Kingdom of the Two Sicilies; Kingdom of Italy
- Current head: Peter Lucchesi-Palli (b. 1943)
- Titles: Prince of Campofranco; Peers of Sicily; Duke of Grazia; Duke of Alagona; Duke of Camastra; Duke of Castelmonte; Duke Lucchesi-Palli; Marquis of Casalgerardo; Marquis of Delia; Marquis of Mezzoiuso; Count of Calatarosato; Count Lucchesi Palli; Baron of Camastra; Baron of Dammisa; Lord of Bertolino; Lord of Bibino Magno; Lord of Burgio Mancino; Lord of Castelluzzo; Lord of Castelnormanno; Lord of Dammisa; Lord of Donna Maria; Lord of San Fratello; Lord of Gebbiarossa; Lord of Grasta; Lord of Giardinello; Lord of Perrana; Lord of Moriella; Lord of Palazzolo; Lord of Pantano; Lord of Suttafari; Lord of Valle dell'Olmo

The House of Lucchese-Palli (also Lucchesi Palli or Lucchese) is a Sicilian princely family, likely of Lucchese origin.

== History ==
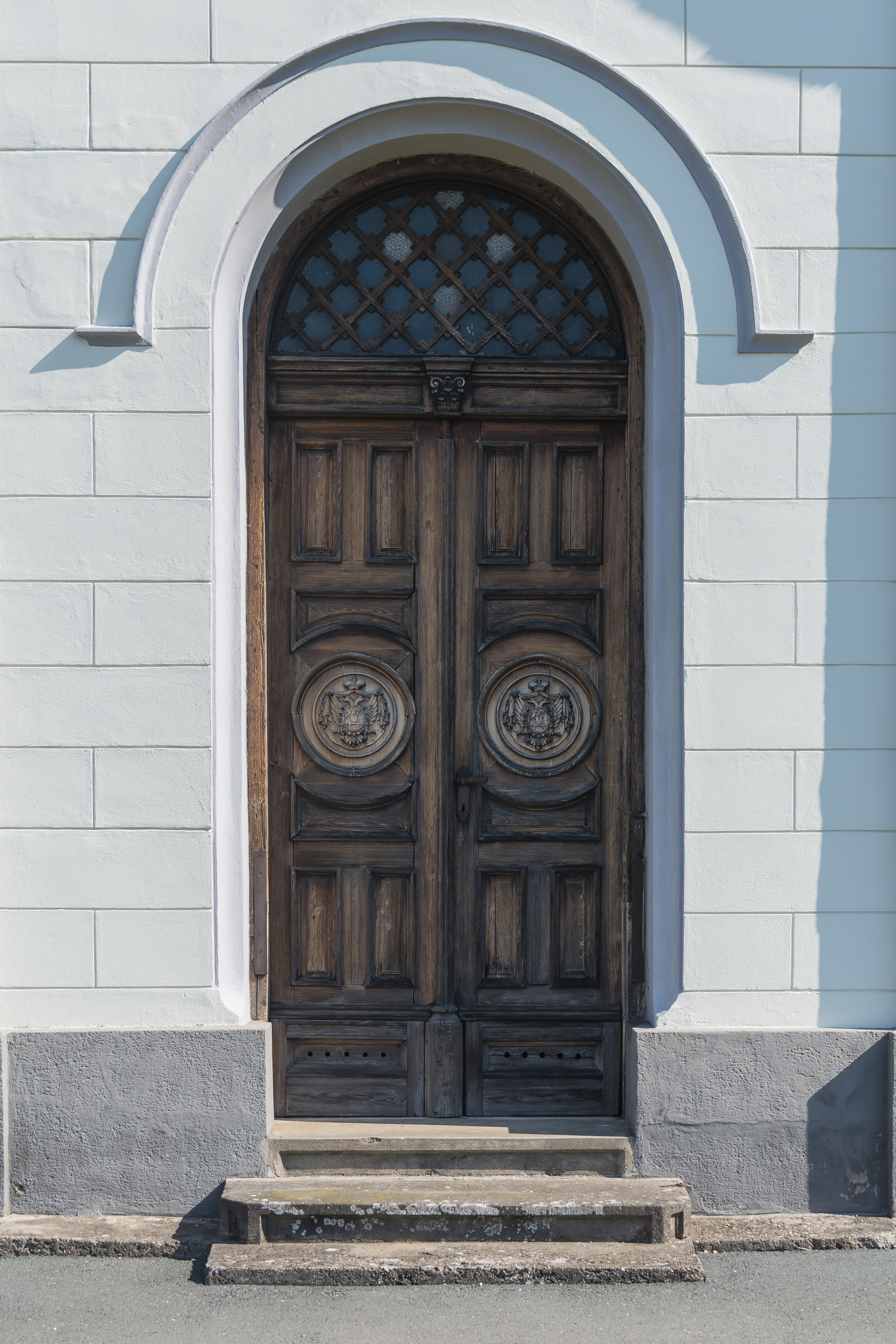
Coat of arms of the House of Lucchesi Palli on the door of the family Mausoleum in the cemetery of Mureck, Austria

There is certain news of them starting from the 15th century. They boast as legendary founder Adinolfo, son of a sister of Desiderio, who took his surname from his own castle called Tre Palli, whose descendants governed Lucca. The Sicilian founder would have been an Andrea Palli who passed to Sicily in 1067 or 1069, also taking the surname Lucchese to remember his homeland. Some Lucchese lived in Sciacca, Naro and Palermo; a Luigi Antonio was created prefect by Frederick II, Duke of Swabia; a Giacomo, Baron of Camastra, was senator of Palermo for several years; a Giuseppe was a juror of Naro. Giovanni, Prince of Campofranco, was praetor of Palermo. A Saverio was a juror of Licata.

Overall, the family owned a principality, that of Campofranco, acquired by Fabrizio in 1625, four duchies, three marquisates, a county and over eighteen fiefs. The Kingdom of Italy recognized the titles of count, Prince of Campofranco and Duke of Grazia.

=== Notable members ===
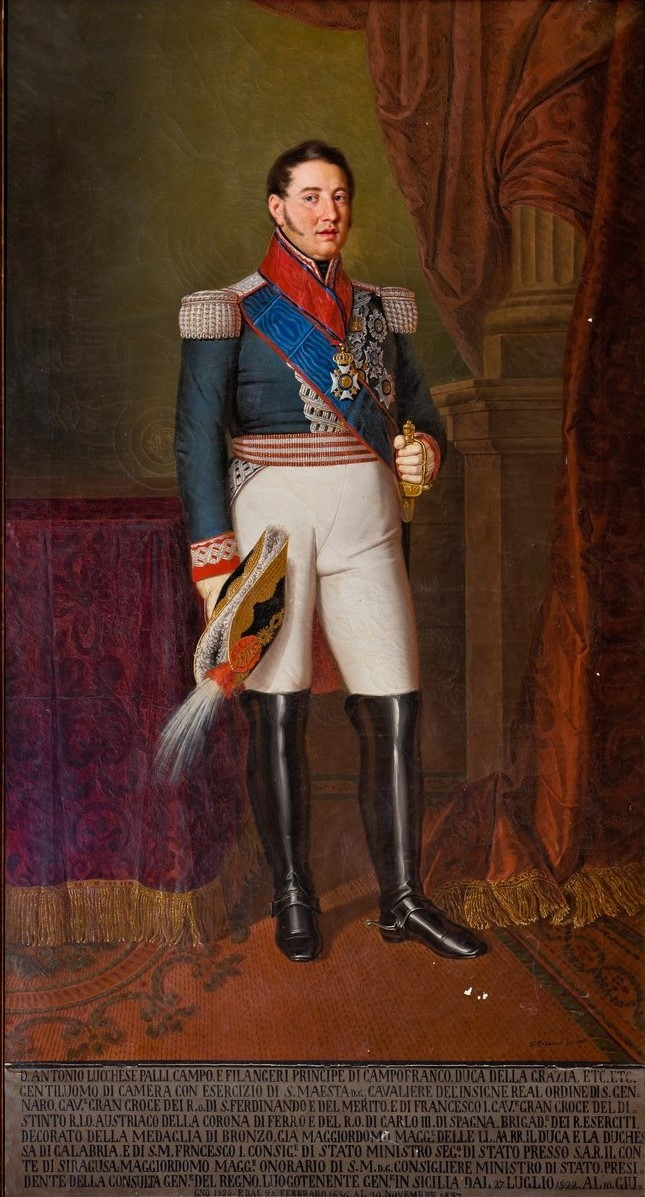
Don Antonio Lucchesi-Palli, 7th Prince of Campofranco, 3rd Duke of Grazia (1781-1856), Lieutenant General of the Kingdom from 1835 to 1837.

- Bernardo Lucchesi-Palli (1470–1526), built the chapel dedicated to the Madonna della Catena in the Cathedral of Naro.
- Fabrizio Lucchesi-Palli, 1st Prince of Campofranco (1608–1631), married Eleonora del Campo; father of Francesca, who was forced into monastic seclusion, annulled her profession with great public outcry to maintain the family patrimony and ensure a lineage.
- Fabrizio Lucchesi-Palli (1663–1707), married Anna Avarna; father of Andrea and Giuseppe, Imperial General and Governor of Brussels, who died in 1757.
- Andrea Lucchesi-Palli (1691–1768), son of Fabrizio; Bishop of Agrigento.
- Antonio Lucchesi-Palli, 6th Prince of Campofranco (1716–1803), son of Emanuele; married Anna Maria Tomasi di Lampedusa; he became 2nd Duke of Grazia in 1729 following the death of his grand-uncle, Antonio Lucchesi-Palli (1664–1729).
- Emanuele Lucchesi-Palli (1735–1795), son of Antonio; married Maria Bianca Filangieri (1756–1802) was the father of Antonio (1781–1856) and of Ferdinando (1784–1847), husband of opera singer Adelaide Tosi.
- Antonio Lucchesi-Palli, 7th Prince of Campofranco (1781–1856), son of Emanuele; Maggiordomo of King Francis I of the Two Sicilies in 1825, Councilor of State in 1831, appointed by Ferdinand II of the Two Sicilies in 1832 as Minister of State, Lieutenant General of the Kingdom from 1835 to 1837; he commissioned the architect Emmanuele Palazzotto in 1835 to design the Campofranco Palace in Palermo; married Maria Francesca Pignatelli.
- Ettore Lucchesi-Palli (1806–1864), son of Antonio; married Princess Marie-Caroline of Bourbon-Two Sicilies (the eldest daughter of King Francis I of the Two Sicilies).
- Adinolfo Lucchesi-Palli (1840–1911), son of Ettore; sports manager and diplomat; married Princess Lucrezia Nicoletta dei duchi di Sasso-Ruffo dei principi di Sant' Antimo, the older sister of the Prince Ruffo, the head of Motta-Bagnara branch, in 1860.
- Pietro Lucchesi-Palli (1870–1939), son of Adinolfo; married Princess Beatrice of Bourbon-Parma in 1906 (a daughter of Robert I, Duke of Parma and Princess Maria Pia of Bourbon-Two Sicilies)
- Ludovico Roberto Lucchesi-Palli (1908–1983), son of Pietro; married Donna Stefania Ruffo of Calabria of the Princes of Scilla.
- Adinolfo Lucchesi-Palli (1911–1986), son of Pietro; married Countess Sarolta Elisabeth of Teleki.
- Peter Lucchesi-Palli (b. 1943), son of Ludovico Roberto; current head of the House of Lucchese-Palli.
- Umberto Lucchesi-Palli (b. 1944), son of Ludovico Roberto; was Italian ambassador to Yemen and to the King of Morocco, who awarded him the Order of Ouissam Alaouite.

== Princes of Campofranco ==
List of the Princes and Princesses of Campofranco and the Head of the House of Lucchese-Palli.

- Fabrizio, created 1st Prince in 1625 (c. 1596–1631)
  - Antonio, 2nd Prince (c. 1618–1652)
  - Francesca, 3rd Princess (c. 1620–1683); married Salvatore Lucchesi-Palli, Baron of Grazia
    - Giovanni, 4th Prince (1658–1695)
      - Emanuele, 5th Prince (1696–1719)
        - Antonio, 6th Prince (1716–1803), became 2nd Duke of Grazia in 1729.
          - Giovanni Emanuele (1735–1795)
            - Antonio, 7th Prince (1781–1856), 3rd Duke
              - Emanuele, 8th Prince (1803–1891)
              - Ettore, 9th Prince (1806–1864), 4th Duke
                - Adinolfo, 10th Prince of Campofranco (1840–1911), 5th Duke
                  - Enrico, 11th Prince (1861–1924), 6th Duke
                  - Carlo, 12th Prince (1868–1951), (Note: As part of the republican constitution that became effective in Italy on 1 January 1948, titles of nobility ceased to be recognized in law (although they were not, strictly, abolished or banned), and the organ of state which had regulated them, the Consulta Araldica, was abolished.) 7th Duke
                    - Roberto (1897–1979)
                  - Pietro (1870–1939)
                    - Ludovico Roberto (1908–1983)
                      - Peter (b. 1943)
                      - Umberto (b. 1944)
                    - Adinolfo (1911–1986)
    - Antonio (1664–1729); created 1st Duke of Grazia in 1699.

== Properties ==
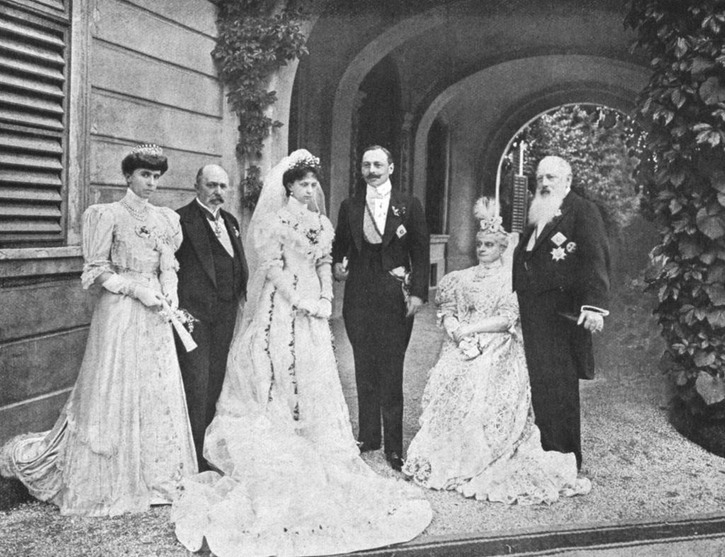
Marriage of Donna Beatrice of Bourbon-Parma with Count Pietro Lucchesi-Palli (on the left the Duke and Duchess of Parma, on the right Prince Adinolfo Lucchesi-Palli with Princess Lucrezia Ruffo), 1906

- Palazzo Campofranco in Palermo
- Palazzo dell'Hotel Bristol in Naples
- Lucchesi-Palli Castle in Campofranco
- Brunnsee Castle, Styria, Austria

== See also ==
- Italian nobility

== Bibliography ==
- Giovanni Battista di Crollalanza; Goffredo di Crollalanza; Aldo di Crollalanza (1879). Presso la direzione del Giornale araldico (ed.). Annuario della nobiltà italiana.
- L.P. Lauriel, ed. (1879). Biblioteca storica e letteraria di Sicilia.
