= Antonio Lucchesi-Palli, 7th Prince of Campofranco =

Don Antonio Lucchesi-Palli 7th Prince of Campofranco 3rd Duke of Grazia
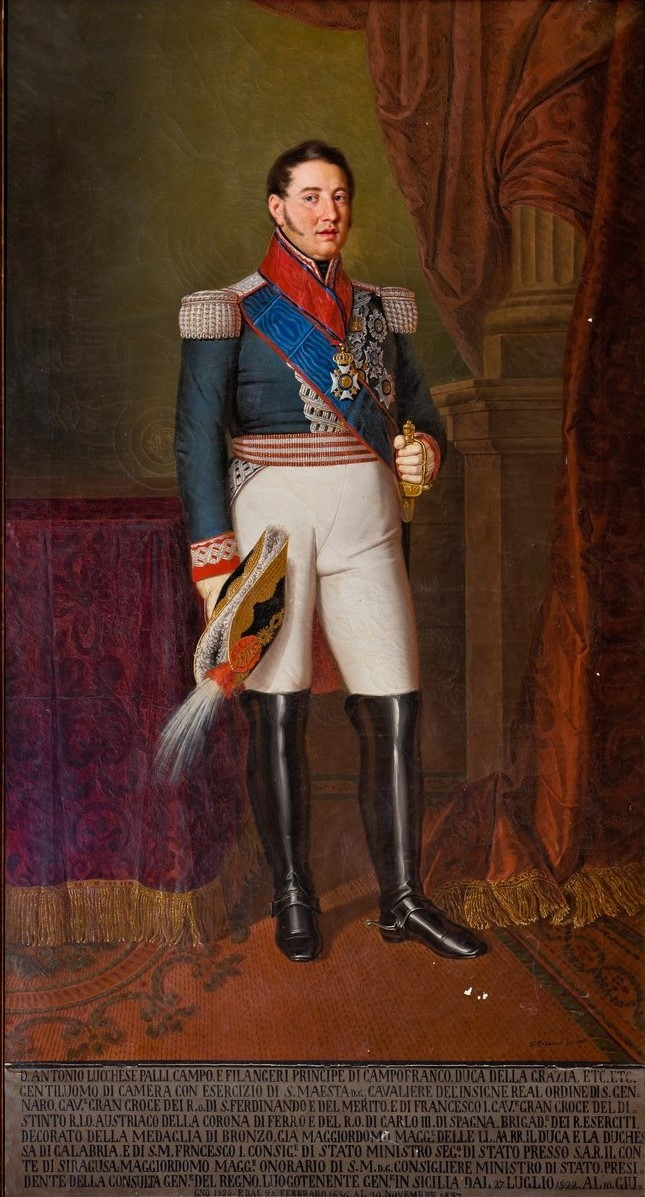
- Portrait of the Prince of Campofranco by Giuseppe Patania, c. 1830

Lieutenant General of the Kingdom of the Two Sicilies
- In office 1835–1837
- Preceded by: Prince Leopold, Count of Syracuse
- Succeeded by: Luigi Nicola De Majo, Duke of San Pietro

Personal details
- Born: Antonio Lucchesi-Palli; 17 May 1781; Palermo, Kingdom of the Two Sicilies
- Died: 26 April 1856 (aged 74); Naples, Kingdom of the Two Sicilies
- Spouse: Donna Maria Francisca Pignatelli (m. 1800; died 1837)

Antonio Lucchesi-Palli, 7th Prince of Campofranco, 3rd Duke of Grazia (17 May 1781 – 26 April 1856) was an Italian nobleman who served as Lieutenant General of the Kingdom from 1835 to 1837.

== Early life ==
Antonio was born into the noble Lucchesi-Palli family in Palermo, Kingdom of the Two Sicilies on 17 May 1781. He was the son of Count Giovanni Emanuele Lucchesi-Palli (1735–1795) and Donna Maria Bianca Filingeri dei principi di Cutò. Among his siblings were Count Alessandro Lucchesi-Palli, Count Ferdinando Lucchesi-Palli (who married the opera singer Adelaide Tosi), Donna Anna Maria Lucchesi-Palli and Donna Nicola Lucchesi-Palli.

His paternal grandparents were Donna Anna Maria Tomasi di Lampedusa and Emanuele Antonio Lucchesi-Palli, who became the 2nd Duke of Grazia in 1729 following the death of his grand-uncle, Antonio Lucchesi-Palli in 1729 (after already becoming the 6th Prince of Campofranco in 1719). His maternal grandparents were Alessandro Filingeri, 6th Prince of Cutò, and Nicoletta Filingeri, 2nd Baroness of San Carlo. Through his brother Ferdinando, he was uncle to Clotilde, who married Domenico Caracciolo, 8th Duke of Vietri, 3rd Duke of Casamassima, 1st Prince of Crucoli, in 1854.

== Career ==
The Prince served as Maggiordomo of King Francis I of the Two Sicilies in 1825, and was appointed Councilor of State in 1831. In 1832, he was appointed by Ferdinand II of the Two Sicilies as Minister of State, and served as Lieutenant General of the Kingdom from 1835 to 1837. In 1835, he commissioned the architect Emmanuele Palazzotto to design the neo-Gothic Campofranco Palace (Palazzo Campofranco) in Palermo.

The Prince was an art collector, and owned The Holy Family (The Madonna del Velo; Madonna di Loreto) from the mid-16th century, a copy after Raphael.

== Personal life ==
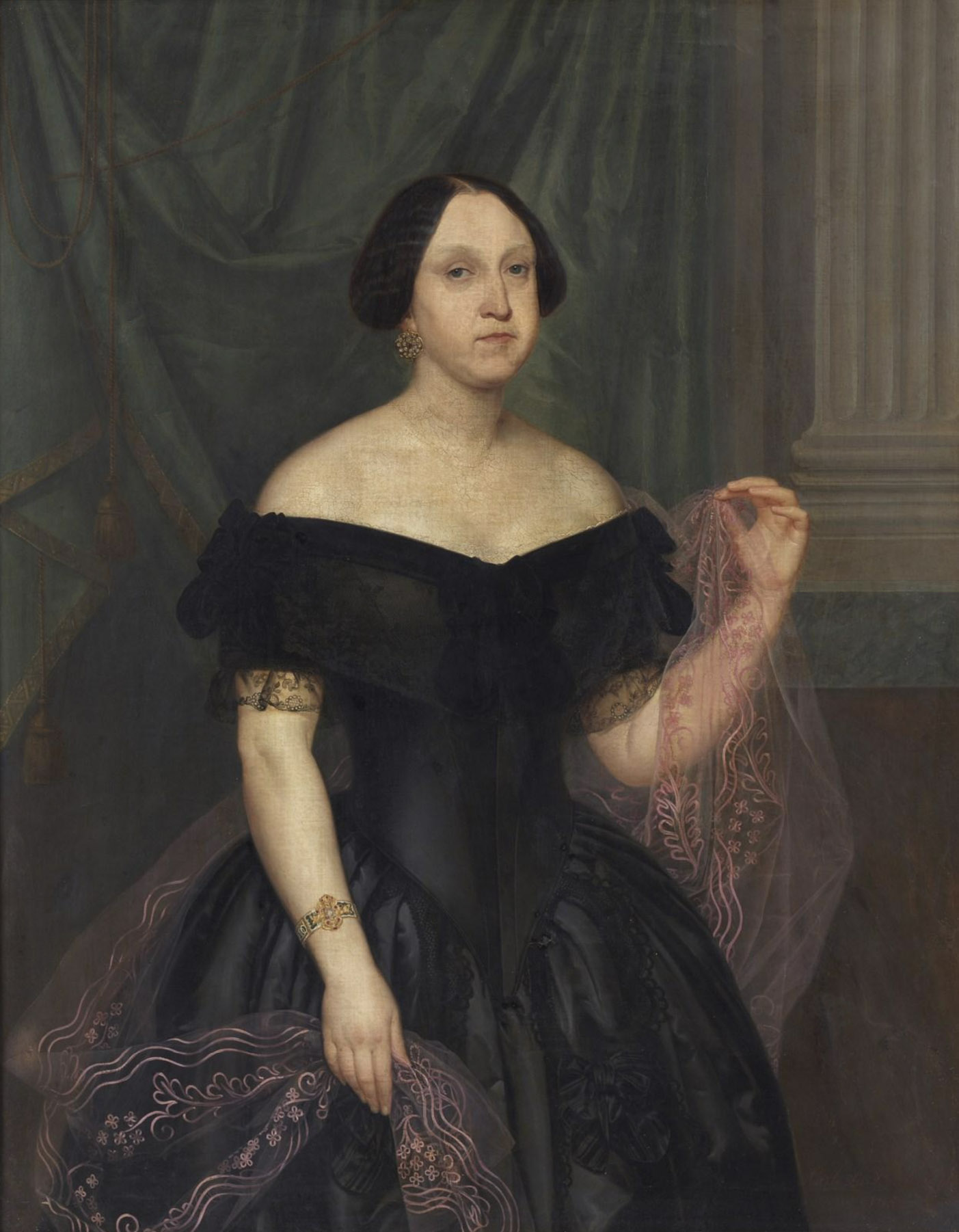
Portrait of his daughter, Bianca, Duchess of Monteleone, by Carlo La Barbera, 1852

On 30 July 1800, Lucchesi-Palli was married to Donna Anna Maria Francisca Paola Pignatelli (1784–1837), a daughter of Ettore Pignatelli, 9th Prince of Noia and 12th Duke of Monteleone, and Princess Anna Maria Piccolomini d'Aragona. Together, they were the parents of:

- Donna Bianca Lucchesi-Palli (1801–1884), who married her first cousin, Giuseppe Pignatelli, 11th Prince of Noia, a son of Diego María Pignatelli, 10th Prince of Noia, and Maria Carmela Caracciolo (a daughter of Giuseppe Litterio Caracciolo, 10th Marquis of Brienza).
- Emanuele Lucchesi-Palli, 8th Prince of Campofranco (1803–1891), who married Princess Emanuela Marziani, a daughter of Salvatore Marziani, Prince of Furnari, in 1818.
- Ettore Lucchesi-Palli (1806–1864), who married Princess Marie-Caroline of Bourbon-Two Sicilies, the eldest daughter of King Francis I and his first wife, Archduchess Maria Clementina of Austria (a daughter of Leopold II, Holy Roman Emperor).
- Don Alessandro Lucchesi-Palli (1809–1888)
- Don Diego Lucchesi-Palli (1811–1811), who died in infancy.
- Don Giuseppe Lucchesi-Palli (1812–1818), who died young.
- Don Francesco Lucchesi-Palli, Marquis of Montescaglioso (1814–1849), who married Donna Rosalia Filomarino, a daughter of Giacomo Filomarino, 11th Prince of Rocca d'Aspro and Rosa Cattaneo della Volta, Marchioness of Montescaglioso, in 1849.
- Donna Marianna Lucchesi-Palli (1819–1892), who married Senator Giuseppe Monroy, Count of Ranchibile, in 1840.

Prince Antonio died in Naples on 26 April 1856.

=== Descendants ===
Through his eldest son Emanuele, he was a grandfather of Donna Francesca Paola Lucchesi-Palli (1826–1851), who married Francesco Notarbartolo, Duke of Villarosa, in 1844.

Through his son Francesco, he was a grandfather of Donna Francesca Lucchesi-Palli (1846–1912), who married Carlo Pignone del Carretto, 8th Prince d'Alessandria.
