= Berrier (surname) =

Berrier is a surname. Notable people with the surname include:

- Jean Berrier (1766–1824), French playwright
- Bill Berrier (20th century), minor league baseball manager
- Ed Berrier (born 1961), second-generation NASCAR driver
- Franck Berrier (1984–2021), French football player
- Todd Berrier (21st century), NASCAR crew chief

== See also ==
- Berryer
