= Adelaide Tosi =

Italian operatic soprano

Adelaide Tosi (c. 1800 – 27 March 1859) was an Italian operatic soprano.

== Early life ==
Tosie was born in Milan in c. 1800.

== Career ==
She studied singing with Girolamo Crescentini. She made her professional debut in her native city on 26 December 1820, singing Ippolito in Simon Mayr's Fedra. On 12 March 1822 she portrayed Azema in the premiere of Giacomo Meyerbeer's L'esule di Granata at La Scala. Her debut in Naples was on 29 September 1824 at the Teatro di San Carlo in the premiere of Giovanni Pacini's Alessandro nelle Indie. On 7 April 1828, she portrayed Bianca in Vincenzo Bellini's Bianca e Fernando for the grand opening of the Teatro Carlo Felice in Genoa. She returned to that house later that season to sing Pamira in Gioachino Rossini's Le siège de Corinthe. She went on to portray roles in three world premieres of operas by Gaetano Donizetti in Naples: Argelia in L'esule di Roma (1828), Neala in Il paria (1829), and Elisabetta in Il castello di Kenilworth (1829).

== Personal life ==
On 2 May 1823 in Milan, Tosi was married to Count Ferdinando Lucchesi-Palli (1784–1847), a son of Count Giovanni Emanuele Lucchesi-Palli and Donna Maria Bianca Filingeri dei principi di Cutò. He was the younger brother of Antonio Lucchesi-Palli, 7th Prince of Campofranco. Together, they were the parents of two children with him:

- Donna Clotilde Lucchesi-Palli (1835–1917), who married Domenico Caracciolo, 8th Duke of Vietri, 3rd Duke of Casamassima, 1st Prince of Crucoli, in 1854.
- Don Edoardo Febo Lucchesi-Palli (1837–1903), who married Giovanna de Gregorio, dei principi di Sant'Elia.

She died in Naples in 1859.
