= Ettore Lucchesi-Palli, 4th Duke of Grazia =

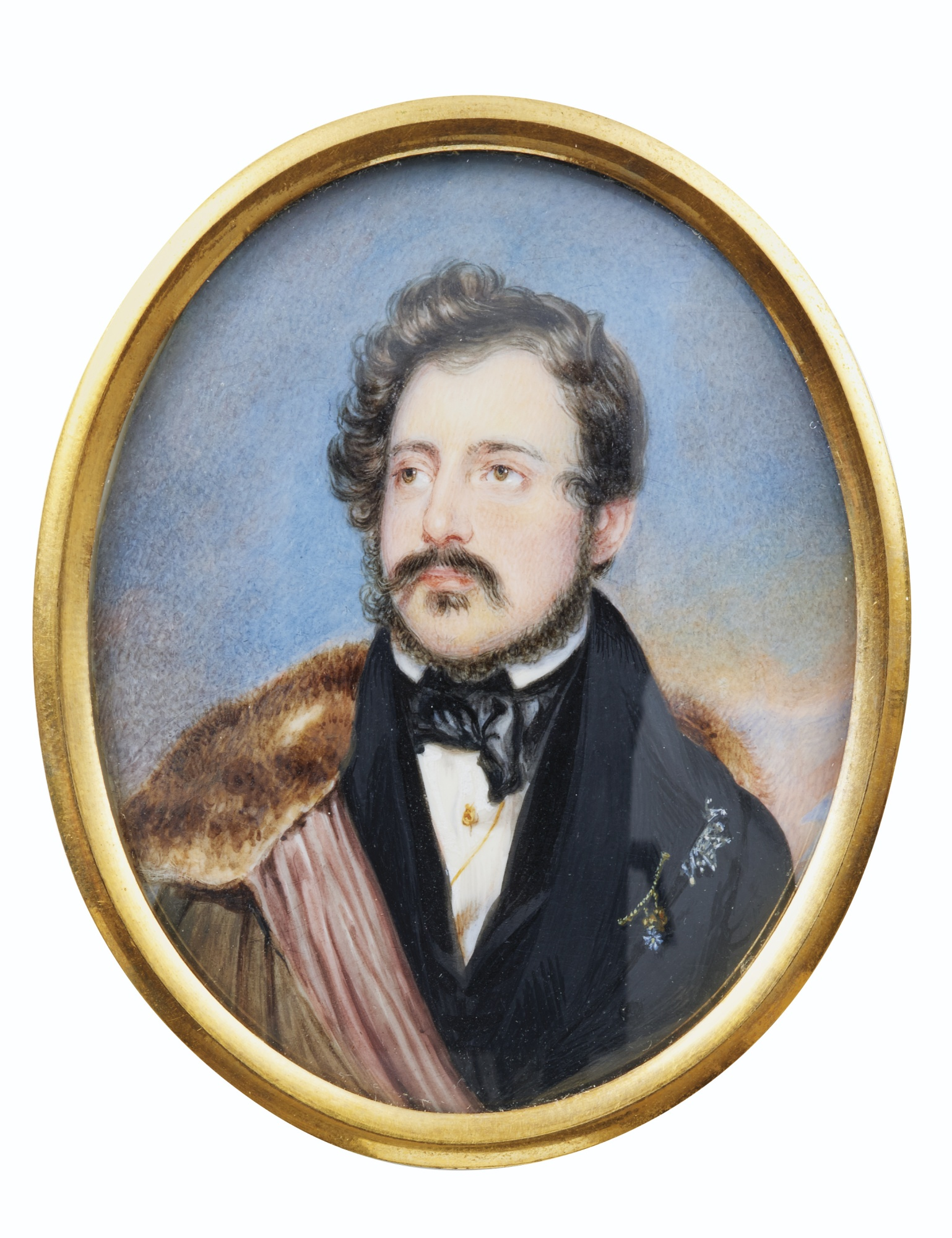
Miniature portrait of the Duke, by Moritz Michael Daffinger

Ettore Carlo Lucchesi-Palli, 4th Duke della Grazia, 9th Prince of Campofranco (2 August 1806 – 1 April 1864) was an Italian nobleman.

== Early life ==
Lucchesi-Palli was born on 2 August 1806 in Palermo, Sicily into the noble Lucchese-Palli family. He was the second son of the Viceroy of Sicily, Antonio Lucchesi-Palli, 7th Prince of Campofranco, 3rd Duke of Grazia, and Anna Maria Francisca Paola Pignatelli Tagliavia d'Aragona (1784–1837). His elder brother was Emanuele, 8th Prince of Campofranco.

His paternal grandparents were Count Giovanni Emanuele Lucchesi-Palli and Maria Bianca Filingeri, dei principi di Cutò. His maternal grandparents were Ettore Pignatelli, 9th Prince of Noia and 12th Duke of Monteleone and Anna Maria Piccolomini d'Aragona, 6th Princess of Valle di Casale and Maida.

== Career ==
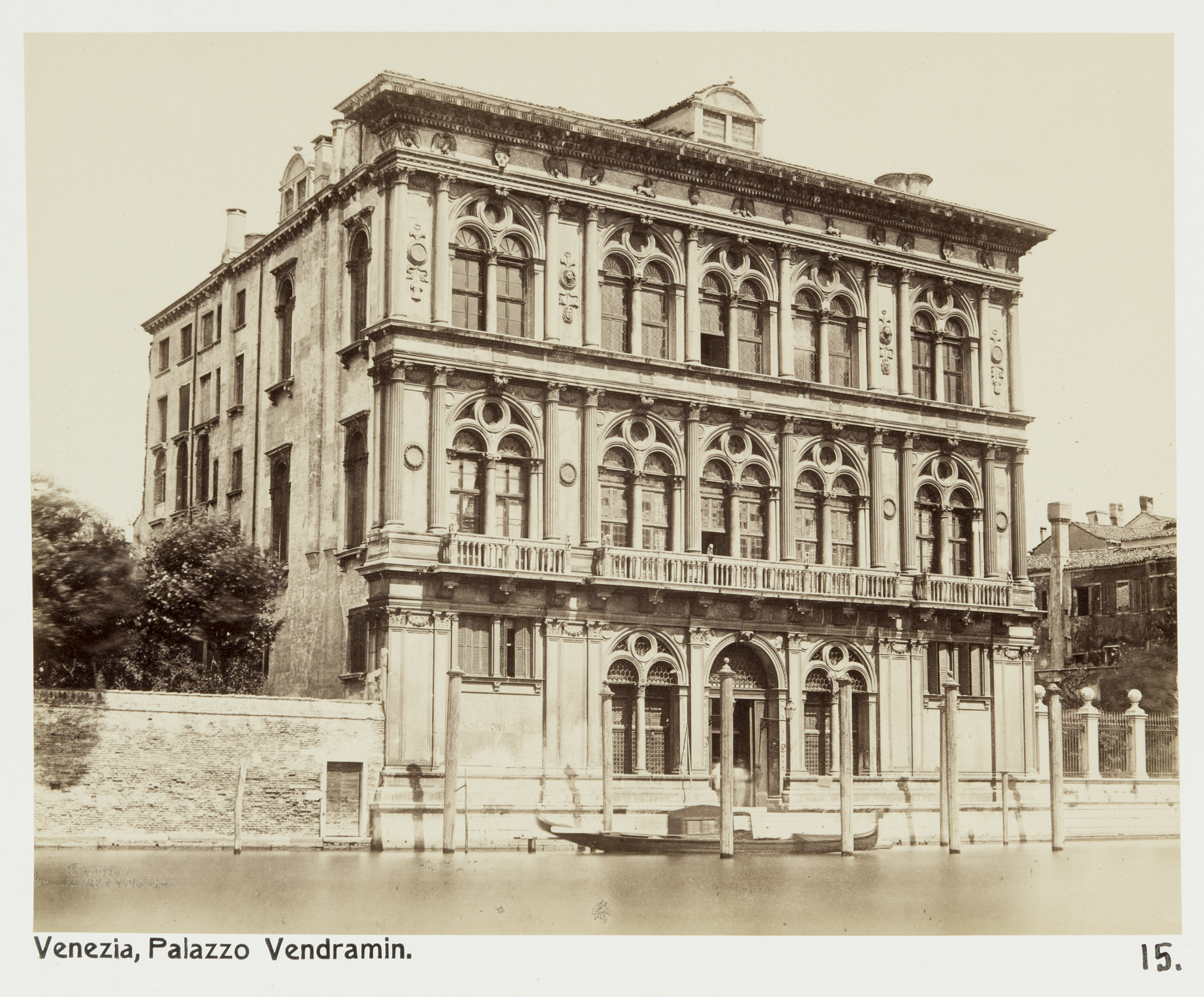
Ca' Vendramin Calergi Palazzo, 1891

After the release of his wife in June 1833, Ettore and Marie-Caroline went to Sicily. In 1844, they purchased the Ca' Vendramin Calergi Palazzo on the Grand Canal in Venice from the last member of the Vendramin family line.

In the turmoil of the Risorgimento, they had to sell the Palazzo to her grandson, Prince Henry, Count of Bardi, and many of its fine works of art were auctioned in Paris. They retired to Brunnsee, near Graz in Austria.

== Personal life ==
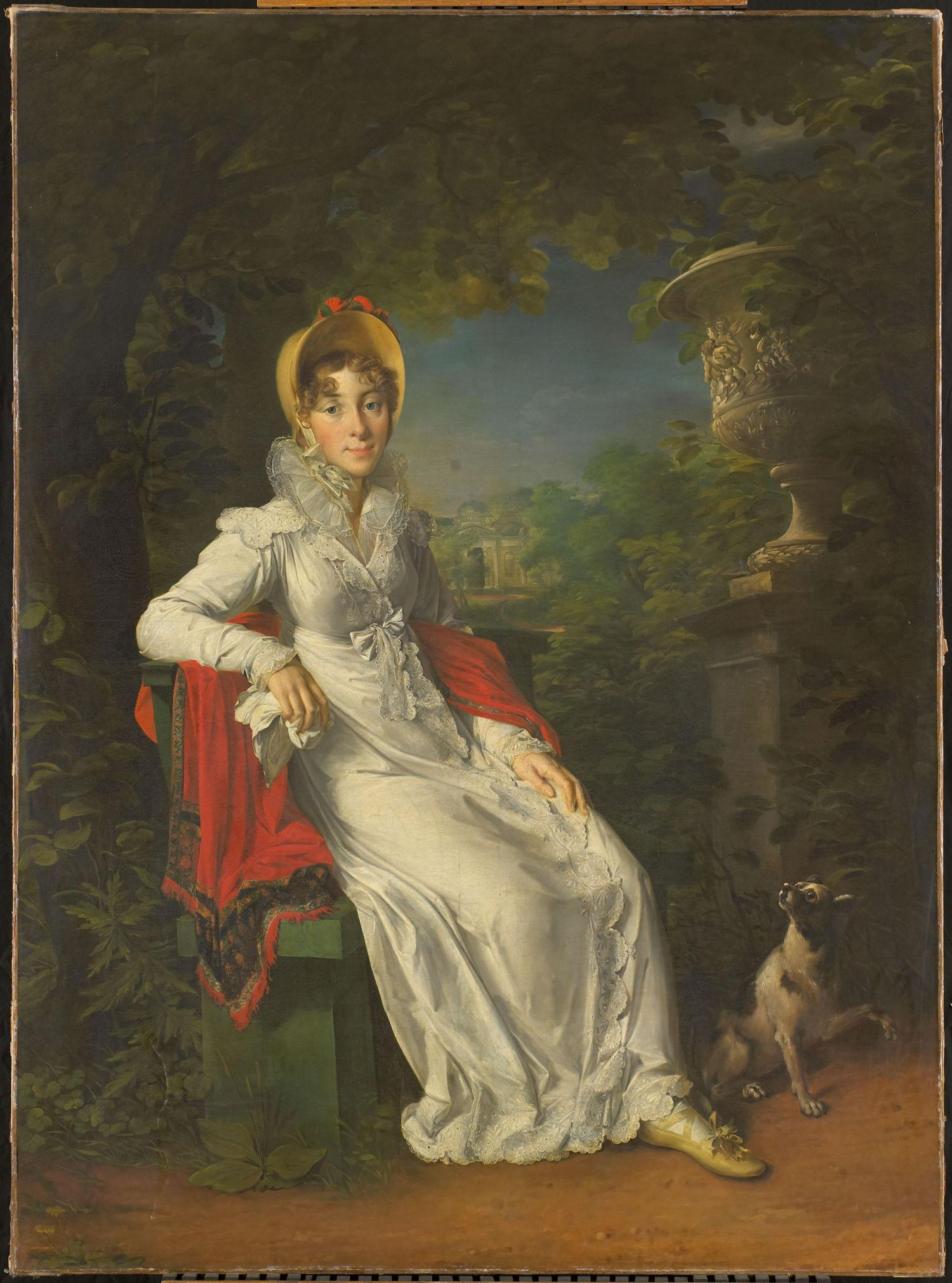
Portrait of his wife, Princess Marie-Caroline in the Bois de Boulogne, by François Gérard, 1837

On 14 December 1831 in Rome, he secretly married the Italian Princess Marie-Caroline of Bourbon-Two Sicilies, Duchess of Berry (1798–1870), a daughter of King Francis I of the Two Sicilies and Archduchess Maria Clementina of Austria (the tenth child and third daughter of Leopold II, Holy Roman Emperor, and Maria Luisa of Spain). A member of the House of Bourbon, from her first marriage to Prince Charles Ferdinand, Duke of Berry, a member of the French royal family, (Note: Charles Ferdinand was assassinated in 1820; Caroline was then pregnant with their fourth child, Henri, Count of Chambord (1820–1883), who was dubbed the "miracle child", as his birth continued the direct Bourbon line of King Louis XIV (his grand-uncle the King Louis XVIII, his grandfather, the future Charles X of France, and Charles' other son Louis Antoine all had no sons). He was thus going to be the eventual heir to the throne. As his mother, Caroline became an important figure in the politics of the Bourbon Restoration.) she was the mother of Princess Louise Marie Thérèse and Henri, Count of Chambord. Shortly after their marriage, she led an unsuccessful rebellion against King Louis-Philippe I to install her son on the French throne. Together, they were the parents of:

- Donna Anna Maria Rosalia Lucchesi-Palli (1833–1833), who was born during her mother's imprisonment at Blaye; she was released and died, aged three months, while in the care of a foster couple in Italy.
- Donna Maria Clementina Isabella Lucchesi-Palli (1835–1925), who married Count Camillo Zileri dal Verme degli Obizzi, the son of Giulio Zilleri dal Verme and Lucrezia dal Verme degli Obizzi, in 1856; Count Camille was the master of the Court of Maria's half-sister, Princess Louise Marie Thérèse, and her husband Charles III, Duke of Parma.
- Donna Francesca di Paola Lucchesi-Palli (1836–1923), who married Carlo Camillo Massimo, 3rd Prince of Arsoli, in 1860.
- Donna Maria Isabella Lucchesi-Palli (1838–1873), who married Maximilien, Marquis of Cavriani in 1856. After his death in 1863, she married Count Giovanni Battista de Conti in 1865.
- Don Maria Adinolfo Lucchesi-Palli (1840–1911), who married Princess Lucrezia Nicoletta Sasso-Ruffo dei principi di Sant' Antimo, the older sister of the Prince Ruffo, the head of Motta-Bagnara branch, in 1860.

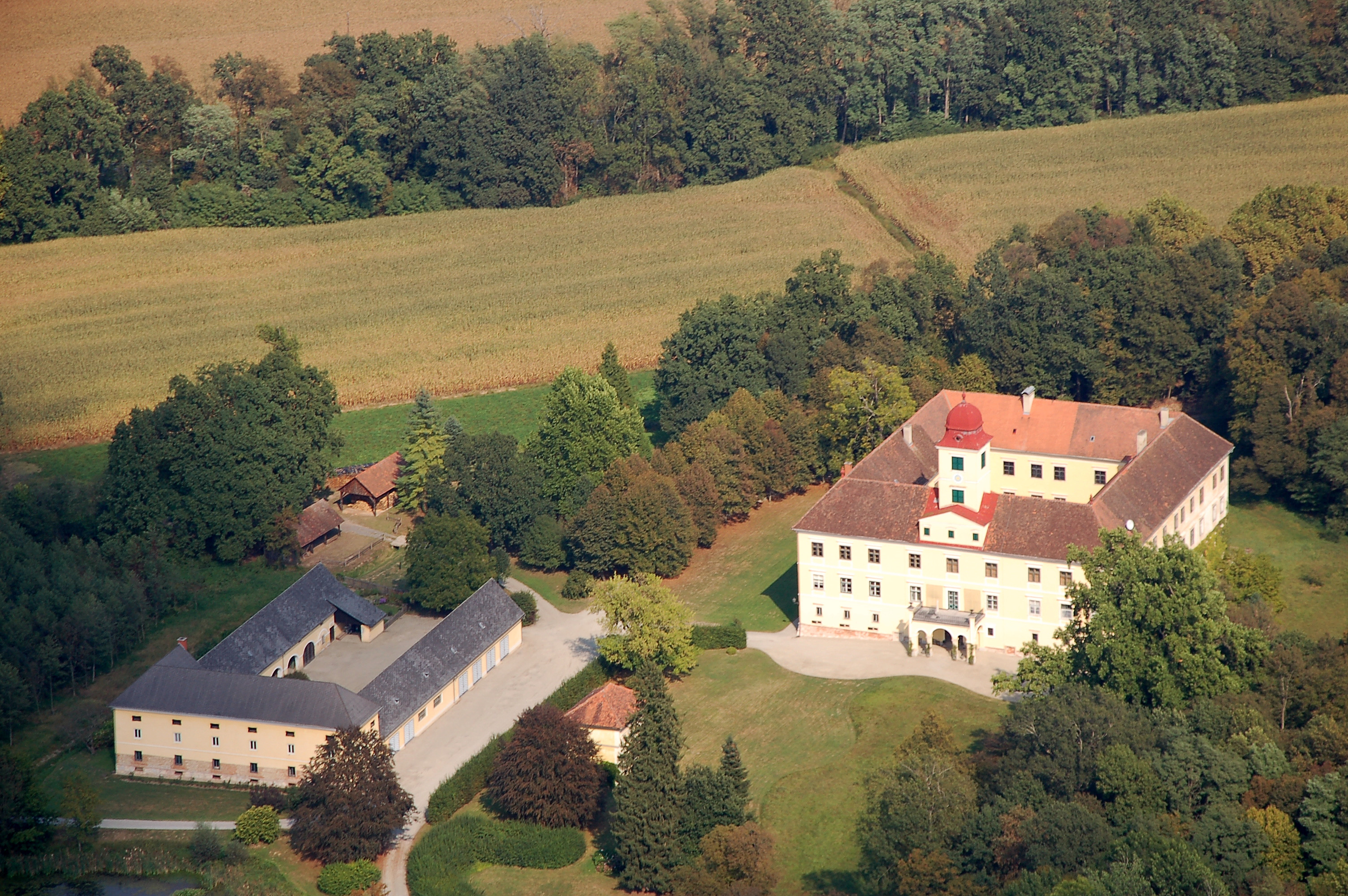
Brunnsee Castle

Lucchesi-Palli died on 1 April 1864 at his family's castle of Brunnsee in Styria, Austria, near Graz. His widow, by that point blind and five million francs in debt because of him, also died at Brunnsee on 16 April 1870. Her son, Henri, had to pay her debt in exchange for the estate in Brunsee and Ca' Loredan Vendramin Calergi.

=== Descendants ===
Through his daughter Maria Clementina, he was a grandfather of Countess Maria Graziella Zileri dal Verme, who married the Jaime Segismundo Álvares Pereira de Melo, the 8th Duke of Cadaval (head of junior Miguelist branch of the House of Braganza), in 1887.

Through his daughter Francesca, he was a grandfather of Prince Fabrizio Massimo di Roviano, who married his first cousin once removed Princess Beatrice of Bourbon, daughter of the Carlist and Legitimist Pretender Prince Carlos, Duke of Madrid and Princess Margherita of Bourbon-Parma.

Through his son Adinolfo, he was a grandfather of Pietro Lucchesi-Pailli, and Gabrielle Lucchesi-Palli (1875–1937), who married Girolamo Brandolini d'Adda, a member of the Brandolini family, in 1898.
