= Andrea Lucchesi-Palli =

Bishop of Agrigento from 1755 to 1768

Most Reverend Andrea Lucchesi-Palli
- Bishop of Agrigento
- Church: Catholic Church
- Diocese: Diocese of Agrigento
- In office: 1755–1768
- Predecessor: Lorenzo Gioeni
- Successor: Antonio Lanza

Orders
- Consecration: 27 July 1755 by Joaquín Fernández de Portocarrero

Personal details
- Born: 16 April 1691 Messina, Italy
- Died: 4 October 1768 (aged 77) Agrigento, Italy

Andrea Lucchesi-Palli (16 April 1691 – 4 October 1768), was an Italian Catholic clergyman who served as the 76th Bishop of Agrigento; he was a member of the noble Sicilian Lucchese-Palli family.

== Early life ==
He was born on 16 April 1692 in Messina to Fabrizio Lucchesi-Palli, Duke of Adragna (1663–1707) and Anna Avarna. His brother, Giuseppe Lucchesi-Palli, became an Imperial General and Governor of Brussels.

== Career ==
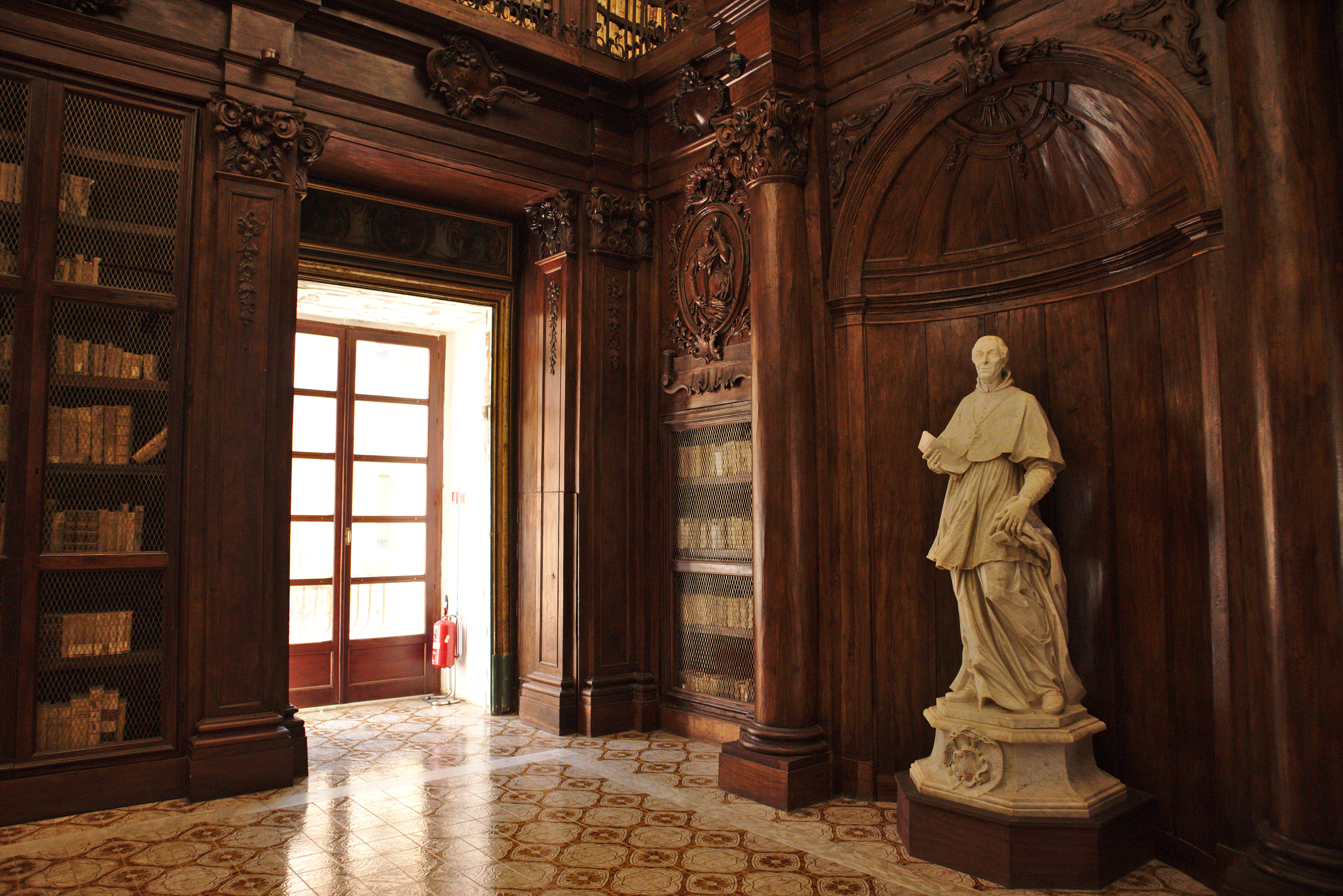
Statue depicting Bishop Lucchesi Palli in the Biblioteca Lucchesiana, founded by him

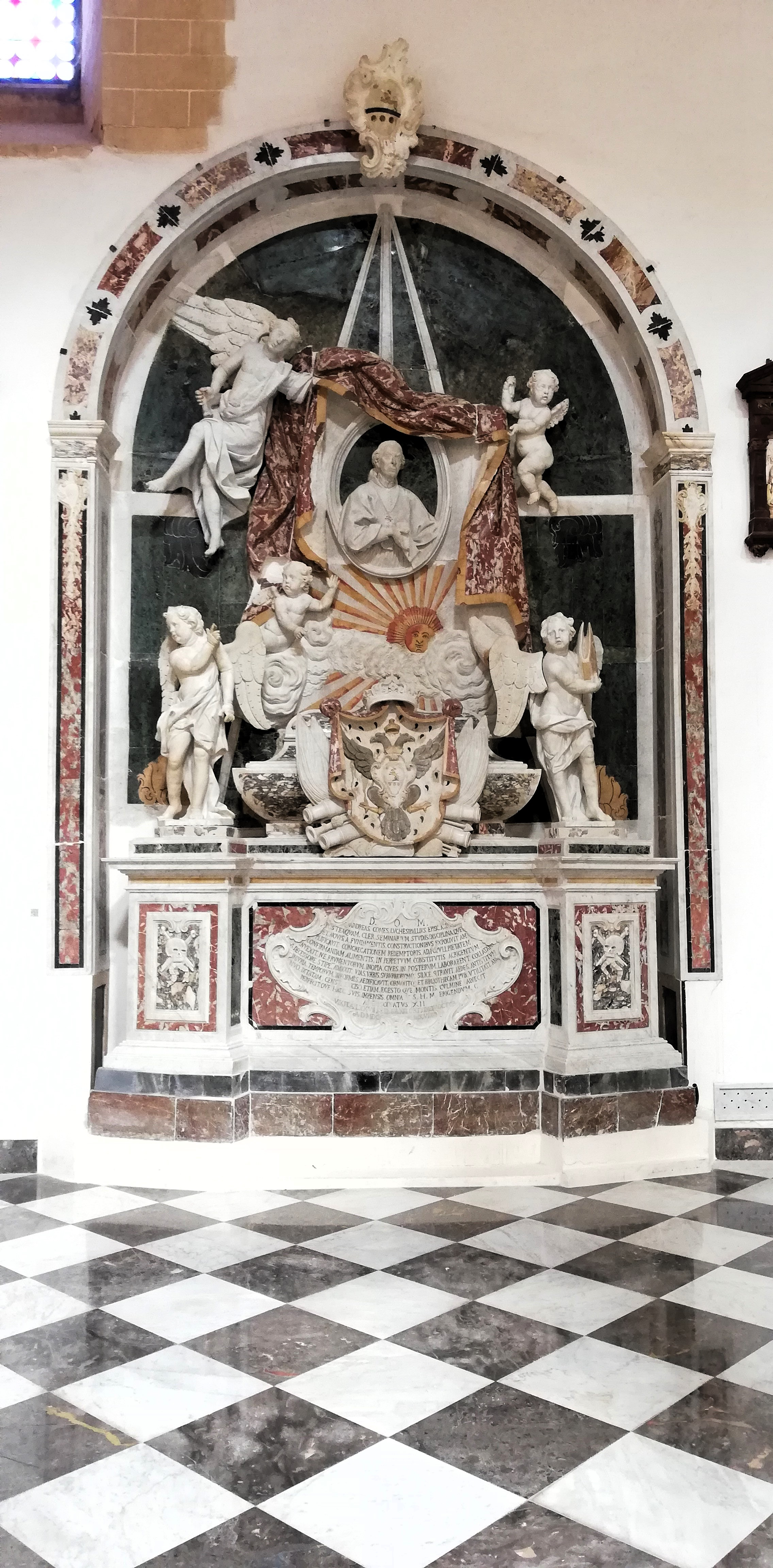
Memorial of Bishop Andrea Lucchesi Palli in the Cathedral of San Gerlando in Agrigento

Having undertaken an ecclesiastical career, he was ordained a Priest on 1 November 1716. He was selected as Bishop of Agrigento on 22 May 1755, confirmed on 21 July 1755 by Pope Benedict XIV and ordained on 27 July 1755.

The renovation of the Bishop's Palace and the construction, in 1765, of the Biblioteca Lucchesiana adjacent to the Palace are due to Bishop Lucchesi Palli. In the first years of its life, the library enjoyed considerable prestige and prosperity, thanks above all to the considerable amount of books and objects donated by the bishop. In fact, for several years he had already possessed a vast collection of volumes (about 20,000 books on science, law, theology and literature), and rare ancient objects, such as gems, semiprecious stones, ancient Roman, Greek and Sicilian coins: all of which were made available to scholars for consultation. The bishop also donated furniture to the library, such as reading tables and fine bookcases, and had the regulations for the use of the Library, which was managed by a delegation of canons, engraved on marble.

== Personal life ==
Lucchesi-Palli died in Agrigento on 4 October 1768 and was buried in the Cathedral of San Gerlando.

Catholic Church titles
Preceded by Lorenzo Gioeni	Bishop of Agrigento; 21 July 1755 – 4 October 1768	Succeeded by Antonio Lanza
