= Massimo family =

Noble family of Rome

House of Massimo
- Black noble family
- Country: Papal States; Italy Italy Corsica
- Founded: 1347; 679 years ago
- Founder: Cecco de Maximis
- Current head: Prince Fabrizio Massimo-Brancaccio (*1963)
- Titles: Cardinal (non-hereditary); Patrizio Romano; Prince of Arsoli; Prince of Roccasecca dei Volsci; Prince of Prossedi; Prince of Roviano; Prince of Triggiano; Duke of Anticoli-Corrado; Duke of Calcata; Duke of Rignano; Marquis of Calcata; Baron of Pisterzo; Lord of Intrafiumara; Noble of Velletri; Noble of Tivoli
- Motto: Cunctando restituit (Latin for 'By delaying, restored')
- Cadet branches: Lancellotti; Massimo-Lancellotti; Massimo d'Aracoeli (ducal branch, extinct 1907)

The House of Massimo is one of the great aristocratic families of Rome, member of the Papal nobility since the 16th century and elevated to princely rank in 1826.

== Legendary origins ==
The Massimo / Massimi family is sometimes referred to as one of the oldest noble families in Europe. According to the Augustinian historian Onofrio Panvinio (1529-1568) in his work "De gente Maxima" of 1556, the family descends in the male line from the "Maximi or Massimi" branch of the ancient Gens Fabia of republican Rome and from Quintus Fabius Maximus Verrucosus (c. 275 BC – 203 BC), called Cunctator ("the Delayer"). When asked by Napoleon (with whom he was negotiating the Treaty of Tolentino) whether the family descended from Fabius Maximus, the then-Prince Massimo famously replied: "Je ne saurais en effet le prouver, c'est un bruit qui ne court que depuis douze cents ans dans notre famille" ("I cannot actually prove it, it's a rumour that's only been running for twelve hundred years in our family").

The Massimo / Massimi family is also said to have provided two popes to the Catholic Church, both saints: Pope Anastasius I (reigned 399–401), who denounced the Origenist heresy, and Pope Paschal I from the Massimi branch of the family (reigned 817–824), who resisted the Frankish Kings and was involved in one of the earliest attempts to Christianise Scandinavia.

The occasional attribution of the canonized Popes Anastasius I and Paschal I to the noble Massimo family, and of that family’s descent from ancient Roman senators, is generally regarded as legendary. Nevertheless, genealogical traditions hold that Pope Paschal I was a direct descendant of the Massimi family. These same traditions link his ancestry to the later Massimi lineage, from which Cardinal Camillo Massimi (1620–1677) also descended, a 17th-century Italian cardinal celebrated for his humanist scholarship, art patronage, and distinguished collection.

== History ==
The current family name better documented history traces back to a Massimo who flourished c. 950 AD, and is identified in the person of Leo de Maximis by 1012.

The asserted genealogy of the family starts however with Cecco di Lello de Maximo, a tradesman member of the Arte della lana in 1347, whose trade benefits started the prosperity of the family. His son Lello, who died in 1420, had a spicer's shop in the Sant'Eustachio Rione and was Conservatore of Rome in 1415. Massimo, son of Lello, was in the banking business and served as Rome's chief Conservatore, a post held by several subsequent members of the family. Luca Massimo (died 1550) was granted the title "Baron of Pisterzo" in 1544 and Fabrizio Camillo Massimo of the Arsoli branch of the family became "Marquis of Roccasecca" in 1686.

Two branches descended from sons of Angelo Massimo (1491–1550), who became first Lord (Signore) of Intrafiumara in 1520; that of Tiberio, whose descendants became Dukes of Rignano and Calcata, and died out in 1907, and that of Fabrizio Massimo (1536–1633), who obtained the lordship of Arsoli in 1574. During the War of the Spanish Succession his descendant Giovanni Camillo Massimo (1659-1711) was sent to protect Italy's interests in the north. In 1711, Giovanni Camillo was executed by Spain and his youngest son Francesco Giovanni Massimi (1696–1745) took asylum in the commune of Massimino, which by 1713 declared sovereign independence. Massimiliano Camillo Massimi (1770–1840) of the latter line was granted the title Prince of Arsoli, by Pope Leo XII and Prince for all descendants in 1826. His grandson, Carlo Camillo (1836–1921), 3rd Prince of Arsoli was additionally made a Roman prince in 1854. His son Francesco Camillo, Prince Massimo and Prince of Arsoli (1865–1943) became "Sopraintendente Generale delle Poste Pontificie", and his grandson Leone, Prince of Arsoli and Prince Massimo (1896–1979) became Duke di Anticoli-Corrado in 1904 by avuncular cession.

Another grandson of the 1st Prince of Arsoli, Don Filippo Massimo (1843–1915), inherited the fortune and adopted the marital surname of the Prince's eldest daughter Donna Giuseppina Massimo (1799–1862), who was the widow and heiress of Ottavio Lancellotti, Prince of Lauro (1789–1852). Although the senior line of Don Filippo's descendants retains the Lancellotti surname and title, his younger son Don Luigi (1881–1968), resumed the paternal name in the combination of "Massimo Lancellotti", and his descendants flourish, having been granted the Italian title "Prince of Prossedi" in 1932.

Although powerful, the post-medieval Massimo were not a sovereign family, yet repeated heads of the family and other family members contracted a remarkable number of marriages with members and descendants of reigning royal dynasties into the late 20th century, consistently so after the marriage in 1765 of Papal postmaster Camillo Francesco Massimo (1730–1801), Marquis of Roccasecca, to Barbara Savelli-Palombara (1750–1826), the last of the great line of the Papal Savelli family and heiress to a large fortune.

Their son the first Prince of Arsoli, Massimiliano Camillo Massimo (1770–1840), married Princess Cristina of Saxony (1775–1837) in 1796, daughter of Xavier of Saxony, Prince of Poland and Lithuania, a younger son of King Augustus III of Poland.

Massimiliano's son, the 2nd Prince of Arsoli Camillo Vittorio Massimo (1803–1873), married Princess Maria Gabriella of Savoy-Carignano (1811–1837] in 1827, second cousin of Charles Albert, King of Sardinia whose son, King Victor Emmanuel II (1820–1878), became the first King of a united Italy in 1861.

The third Prince of Arsoli, Camillo Carlo Massimo (1836–1873) wed Donna Francesca Lucchesi Palli (1836–1923), the daughter of Ettore Lucchesi-Palli, 8th Duke della Grazia. Through her mother, Princess Maria Carolina of Bourbon-Sicily (1798–1870), the daughter of the Neapolitan King Francis I of the Two Sicilies (and widow of Charles X of France's assassinated heir, Charles Ferdinand, Duke of Berry), Francesca was a half-sister of the Legitimist pretender to the French throne Henri, Count of Chambord.

They had two sons, Francesco Massimo, 4th Prince of Arsoli and Prince Massimo (1865–1943), who married Donna Eleonora Brancaccio (1875–1943) in 1895 (daughter of Salvatore Brancaccio, Prince of Triggiano), and Fabrizio Massimo (1868–1944) who in 1895 had been ceded the tiles of Prince of Roviano and Duke of Anticoli-Corrado, and who in 1897 married HRH Princess Beatrice of Bourbon (1874–1961), daughter of the Carlist pretender to the French and Spanish thrones, Carlos, Duke of Madrid. Prince Fabrizio and the Infanta had four daughters no sons: Margherita Massimo who married Emilio Pagliano, Fabiola Massimo who married Enzo Galli Zugaro, Maria della Neve Massimo who married Charles Piercy, and Bianca Massimo who married Graf Paul von Wurmbrand-Stuppach. In 1904, Fabrizio ceded the dukedom of Anticoli-Corrado to his nephew Prince Leone Massimo, son of his elder brother the 4th Prince of Arsoli.

Prince Leone (1896–1979) also became 5th Prince of Arsoli and Prince Massimo in 1943, having in 1935 wed HRH Princess Maria Adelaide of Savoy-Genoa (1904–1979), daughter of Prince Thomas, Duke of Genoa (1854–1931) and first cousin of then-reigning Victor Emmanuel III of Savoy, King of Italy.

The Massimo tradition of royal intermarriage continued when, in 1989, Prince Carlo Massimo (born 1942) married Doña Elisa Osorio de Moscoso y Estagna (born 1946), daughter of Pedro, Duke de Montemar (1904–1986), whose paternal great-grandmother was the Infanta Luisa Teresa de Borbón-Cadiz, daughter of the Infante Francisco de Paula of Spain (1824–1900) by her marriage to José Osorio de Moscoso, Duke de Sessa.

The princely family is represented by Fabrizio Prince Massimo, 7th Prince of Arsoli and Triggiano (born 1963), Prince Jimmy Massimo (born 1981), and by Stefano Massimo, Prince of Roccasecca dei Volsci (born 1955), whose heir is Prince Valerio Massimo (born 1973). On the 21 May 2009 Prince Valerio reached the summit of Mount Everest.

== Significance ==
The family were major patrons of the arts, with the brothers Pietro and Francesco Massimo acquiring fame by protecting and encouraging the German printers Arnold Pannartz and Konrad Sweynheim, who came to Rome in 1467, where the first printed books in Italy were produced in the Massimo Palace. In the 17th century Cardinal Camillo II Massimo was famous as the patron of both Velasquez and Poussin.

The Palazzo Massimo alle Colonne in Rome was built by the celebrated Sienese architect Baldassare Peruzzi by order of Pietro Massimo, on the ruins of an earlier palace destroyed in the sack of Rome in 1527. The curved façade is built on and dictated by the foundations of the stands for the stadium odeon of the emperor Domitian. The interior ceilings and vestibules are elaborately ornamented with rosettes and coffered roofs. The entrance ceiling is decorated with a fresco by Daniele da Volterra, who represented "Life of Fabius Maximus". The chapel on the 2nd floor was a room where the 14-year-old Paolo Massimo, son of Prince Fabrizio Massimo, was recalled briefly to life by Saint Philip Neri on March 16, 1583. The interior of the palace is open to public only on that day each year when the family receive the cardinals and other high officials to honor the event. Other notable events in the palace of the 16th century include various intra-familial murders. The palace is considered one of the most important early Renaissance mannerist masterpieces and remains the principal residence of the family, along with the Massimo castle in Arsoli.

== Sources ==
- "Paul Theroff's Online Gotha"
- Rendina, Claudio (2004). Le grandi famiglie di Roma. Rome: Newton Compton.
