= Berryer =

Berryer is a surname. Notable people with the surname include:

- Antoine Pierre Berryer (1790–1868), French advocate and parliamentary orator
- Nicolas René Berryer (1703–1762), French magistrate and politician

== See also ==
- Berrier (surname)
