= Filomarino =

Filomarino is an Italian surname. Notable people with the surname include:

- Ascanio Filomarino (1583–1666), Italian Roman Catholic cardinal
- Ferdinando Cito Filomarino (born 1986), Italian film director and screenwriter
- Gennaro Filomarino (1591–1650), Roman Catholic prelate
- Paolo Filomarino (1562–1623), Roman Catholic prelate
