= Marie-Caroline of Bourbon-Two Sicilies, Duchess of Berry =

Italian and French princess (1798–1870)

Princess Marie Caroline
- Duchess of Berry; Duchess della Grazia
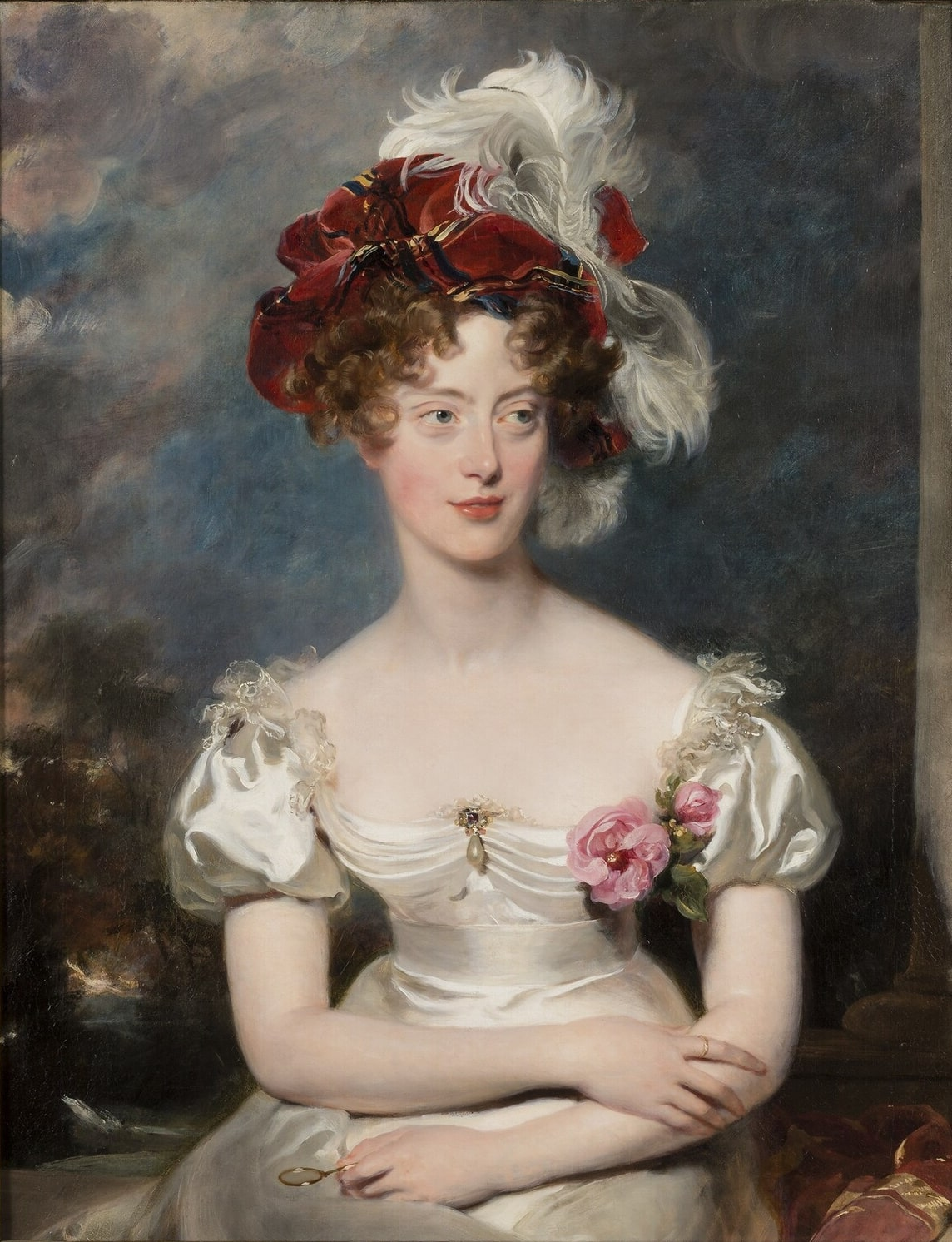
- Portrait of the Duchess of Berry (1825)
- Born: 5 November 1798; Caserta Palace, Caserta, Kingdom of Naples
- Died: 16 April 1870 (aged 71); Brunnsee, Styria, Austria-Hungary
- Burial: Mureck Cemetery, Mureck, Austria
- Spouse: Prince Charles Ferdinand, Duke of Berry (m. 1816; died 1820) Ettore Lucchesi-Palli, 4th Duke of Grazia (m. 1831; died 1864)
- Issue 5 more...: Louise, Duchess of Parma and Piacenza; Henri, Count of Chambord; Adinolfo Lucchesi-Palli, 9th Duke della Grazia
Names
- Italian: Maria Carolina Ferdinanda Luisa; French: Marie Caroline Ferdinande Louise
- House: Bourbon-Two Sicilies
- Father: Francis I of the Two Sicilies
- Mother: Archduchess Maria Clementina of Austria
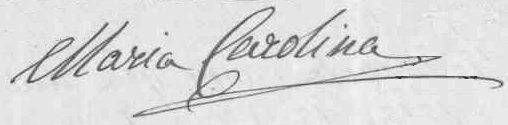
- Signature

Princess Maria Carolina of Naples and Sicily (Maria Carolina Ferdinanda Luisa; 5 November 1798 – 16 April 1870) was an Italian princess of the House of Bourbon who married into the French royal family, and was the mother of Henri, Count of Chambord. She led an unsuccessful rebellion against King Louis Philippe I to install her son on the French throne.

== Early life ==
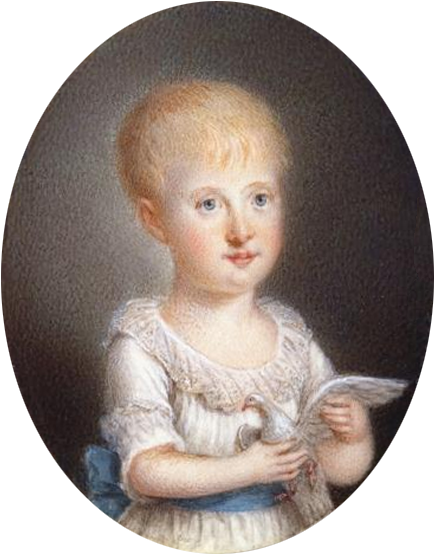
Maria Carolina as a child in Naples, early 1800s

Maria Carolina was born at Caserta Palace in Naples. She was the eldest child of Prince Francesco, the future King Francis I of the Two Sicilies, and his first wife, Archduchess Maria Clementina of Austria, the tenth child and third daughter of Emperor Leopold II and Maria Luisa of Spain. Her parents were double first cousins, meaning that rather than the usual eight great-grandparents, Maria Carolina had four.

Maria Carolina was baptised with the names of her paternal grandparents, Maria Carolina of Austria and King Ferdinand IV of Naples and III of Sicily, as well as her maternal grandmother Empress Maria Louisa.

She spent her youth in Palermo and in Naples. Her mother died in 1801; her father married again in 1802 to Infanta María Isabel of Spain, another first cousin, and had twelve more children.

== French marriage ==
In 1816, French ambassador Pierre Louis Jean Casimir de Blacas arranged with the Kingdoms of Naples and Sicily (Note: Which became the Kingdom of the Two Sicilies in December.) for Maria Carolina to marry Louis XVIII's nephew, Prince Charles Ferdinand, Duke of Berry. The marriage was held on 24 April 1816 in Naples. Maria Carolina thus became Duchess of Berry; known as Madame de Berry in France.

Even though it was arranged, the marriage was happy, with Maria Carolina and her husband living at the Élysée Palace in Paris which was given to them. They had four children, of which the youngest two survived infancy. The elder was Louise of Artois (1819–1864).

== Widowhood ==
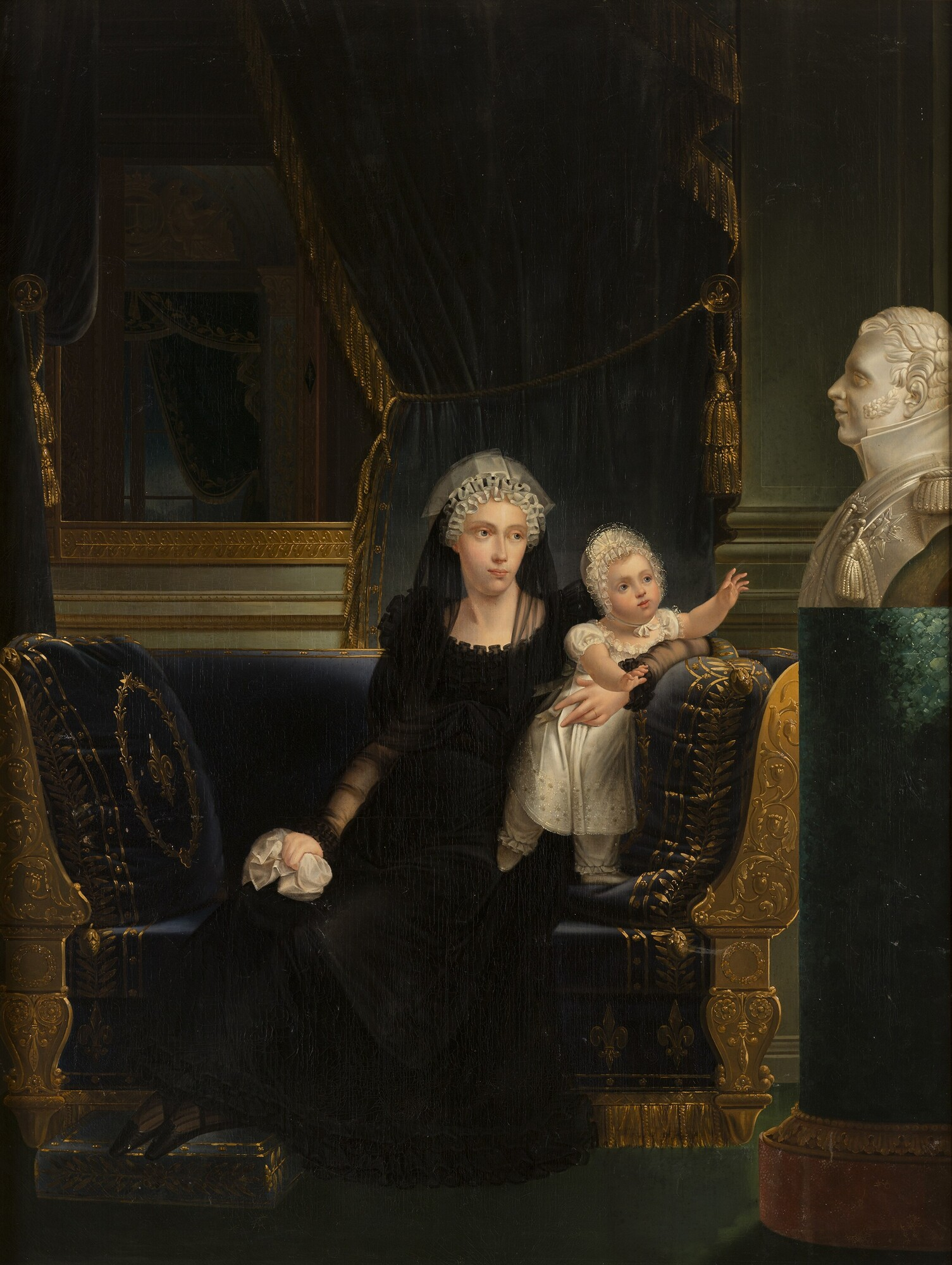
Marie Caroline dressed in mourning with her daughter Louise Marie Thérèse, overlooked by a bust of her deceased husband

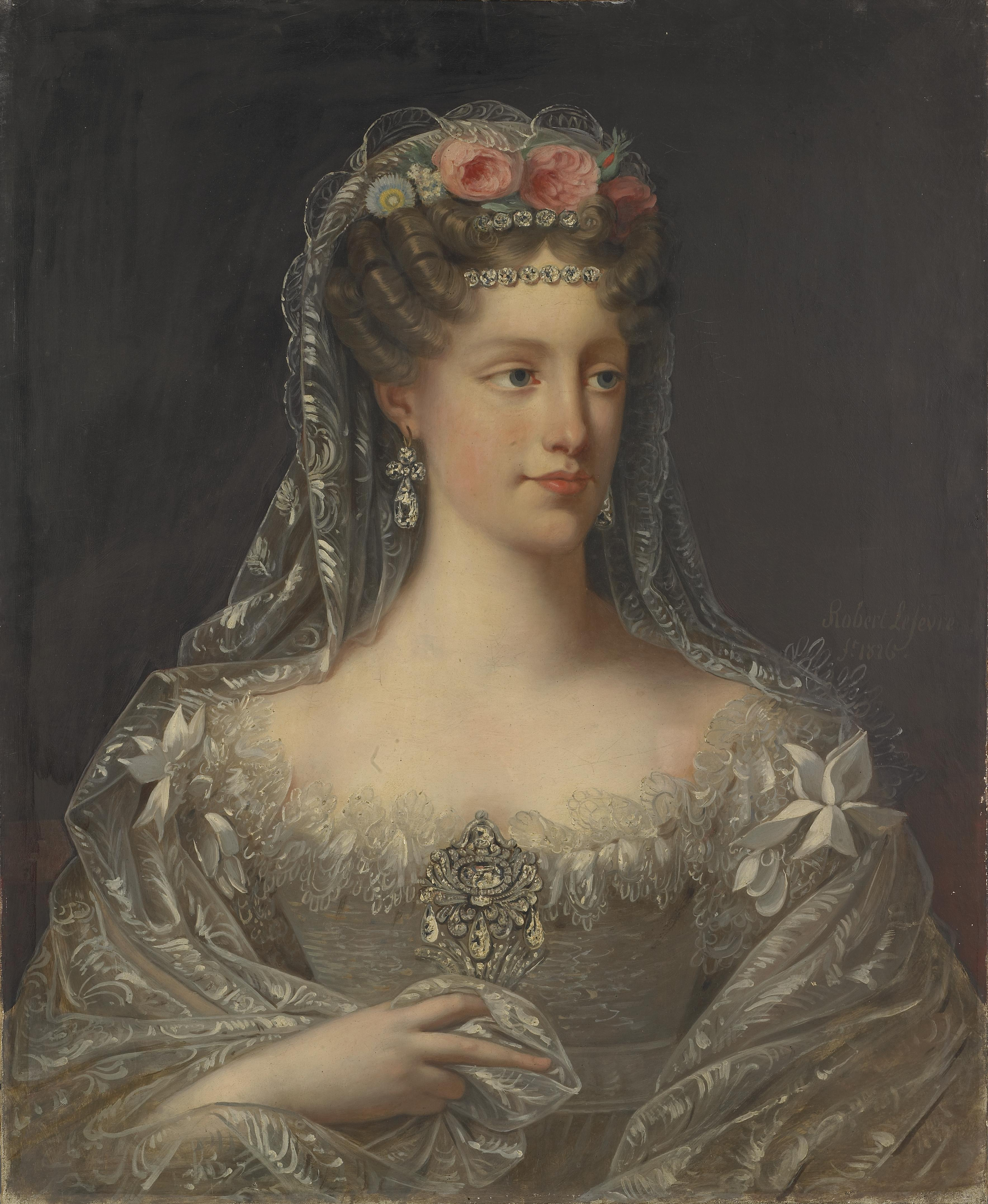
Portrait by Robert Lefèvre, 1826

Charles Ferdinand was assassinated in 1820; Marie Caroline was then pregnant with their fourth child, Henri, Duke of Bordeaux (1820–1883), who was dubbed the "miracle child", as his birth continued the direct Bourbon line of King Louis XIV (his grand-uncle the King Louis XVIII, his grandfather, the future Charles X, and Charles' other son Louis Antoine all had no sons). He was thus going to be the eventual heir to the throne. As his mother, Marie Caroline became an important figure in the politics of the Bourbon Restoration.

In 1824, Louis XVIII died and was succeeded by Marie Caroline's father-in-law as Charles X.

In the July Revolution of 1830, Charles X was overthrown. Both Charles and his elder son abdicated; but their cousin Louis Philippe of Orléans, who happened to be Marie Caroline's paternal uncle by marriage, did not proclaim Henri as King. In May 1832, the Duchess of Berry hastened from Paris by the aid of Pierre-Antoine de Candie de la Berryer, counselor to the Parlement, on her landing in the south of France to organize an insurrection in favor of her son, the Duke of Bordeaux, since then known as the Count of Chambord. Instead Louis Philippe allowed the Chamber of Deputies to declare him king. Marie Caroline and Henri went into exile with Charles and his family. She lived in Bath for a time, and then joined Charles and Louis Antoine in Edinburgh. Charles lived in Holyrood Palace, but Marie Caroline (and also Louis Antoine) lived at 11 (now 12) Regent Terrace.

== Rebellion ==
Marie Caroline did not find conditions in Edinburgh agreeable, nor did she accept her son's exclusion from the throne by the Orléanist "King of the French". She declared her son to be the legitimate king, and herself to be regent. In 1831 she left Edinburgh, and returned to her family in Naples via the Netherlands, Prussia, and Austria. From Naples, with the help of the Vicomte de Saint Priest, she intrigued for a Legitimist rebellion to "restore" Henri to the throne. She also secretly married an Italian nobleman, Ettore Carlo Lucchesi-Palli, Duca della Grazia (1805–1864) on 14 December of that year.

In April 1832 she landed near Marseille. Receiving little support, she made her way to the Vendée and Brittany, where she succeeded in instigating a brief but abortive insurrection in June 1832. However, her followers were defeated. After remaining hidden for five months in a house in Nantes, she was betrayed by Simon Deutz to the government in November 1832, and imprisoned in the Chateau of Blaye.

Anxious to avoid inflaming public opinion any further, the Orleanist government refused to bring Marie Caroline to trial. Instead, the government argued that, because she and the other members of the senior Bourbon branch had been banished from France three years earlier, Marie Caroline was not subject to French law, nor did she enjoy its protections. In effect, this gave the government the right to detain her indefinitely as a political prisoner.

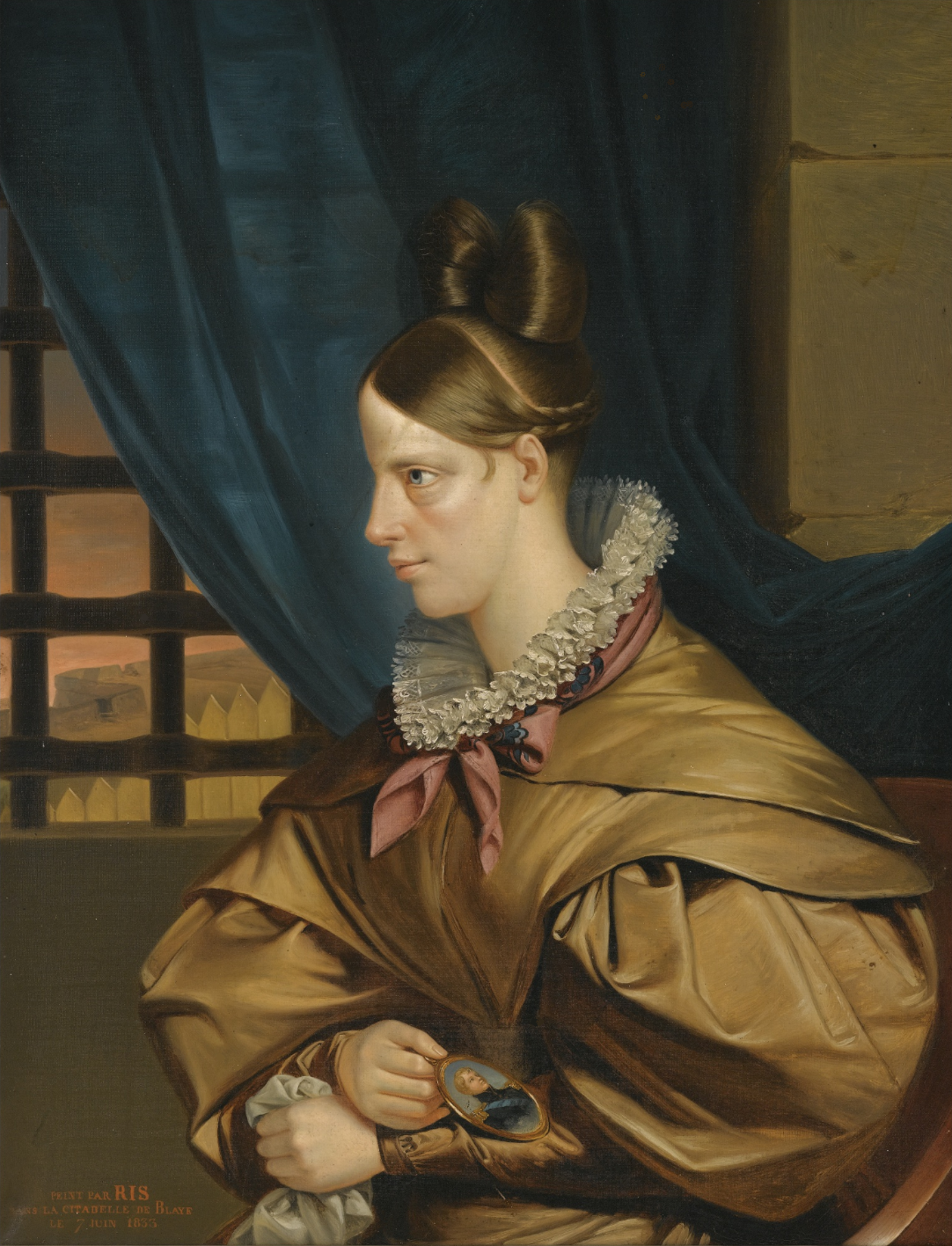
Duchess of Berry imprisoned in Blaye, 1832

Early in her incarceration, rumors began to circulate that the Duchess was pregnant. On 26 February 1833, she published a statement in Le Moniteur Universel announcing that she had secretly remarried, though she failed to state the identity of her new husband. The announcement scandalized her supporters and was interpreted as an admission of her pregnancy.

It was only after she gave birth in May that she named Count Lucchesi-Palli as her husband and the child's father. Few believed this claim, however, since the Count was known to have been living in Holland during the time the child was conceived. The Comtesse de Boigne claimed the union to have been hastily arranged by partisans of the Duchess, in order to save her reputation and conceal the scandal of having a child out of wedlock. She claimed that Madame du Cayla had bribed the debt-ridden Count to agree to the scheme, and that she had even obtained a forged marriage certificate in the Duchy of Modena to make the union appear legitimate.

Whatever the truth of these claims, Marie Caroline's remarriage lost her the sympathies of the Legitimists. She had French nationality by her marriage to the Duke of Berry, but lost it by her remarriage to an Italian; thus she was in theory ineligible to serve as regent. She was no longer an object of fear to the French government, which released her in June 1833.

== Later life ==
After her release, Marie Caroline went to Sicily with her husband. The daughter born in prison died in infancy, as did another daughter born the following year, but they had four additional surviving children after that. In 1844, Marie Caroline and her husband purchased the Ca' Vendramin Calergi palazzo on the Grand Canal in Venice from the last member of the Vendramin family line.

In the turmoil of the Risorgimento, they had to sell the palazzo to her grandson, Prince Henry, Count of Bardi, and many of its fine works of art were auctioned in Paris. They retired to Brunnsee, near Graz in Austria. Her husband died there in 1864, and she died in 1870.

French novelist Alexandre Dumas wrote two stories about her and her plotting.

== Patron of the arts ==
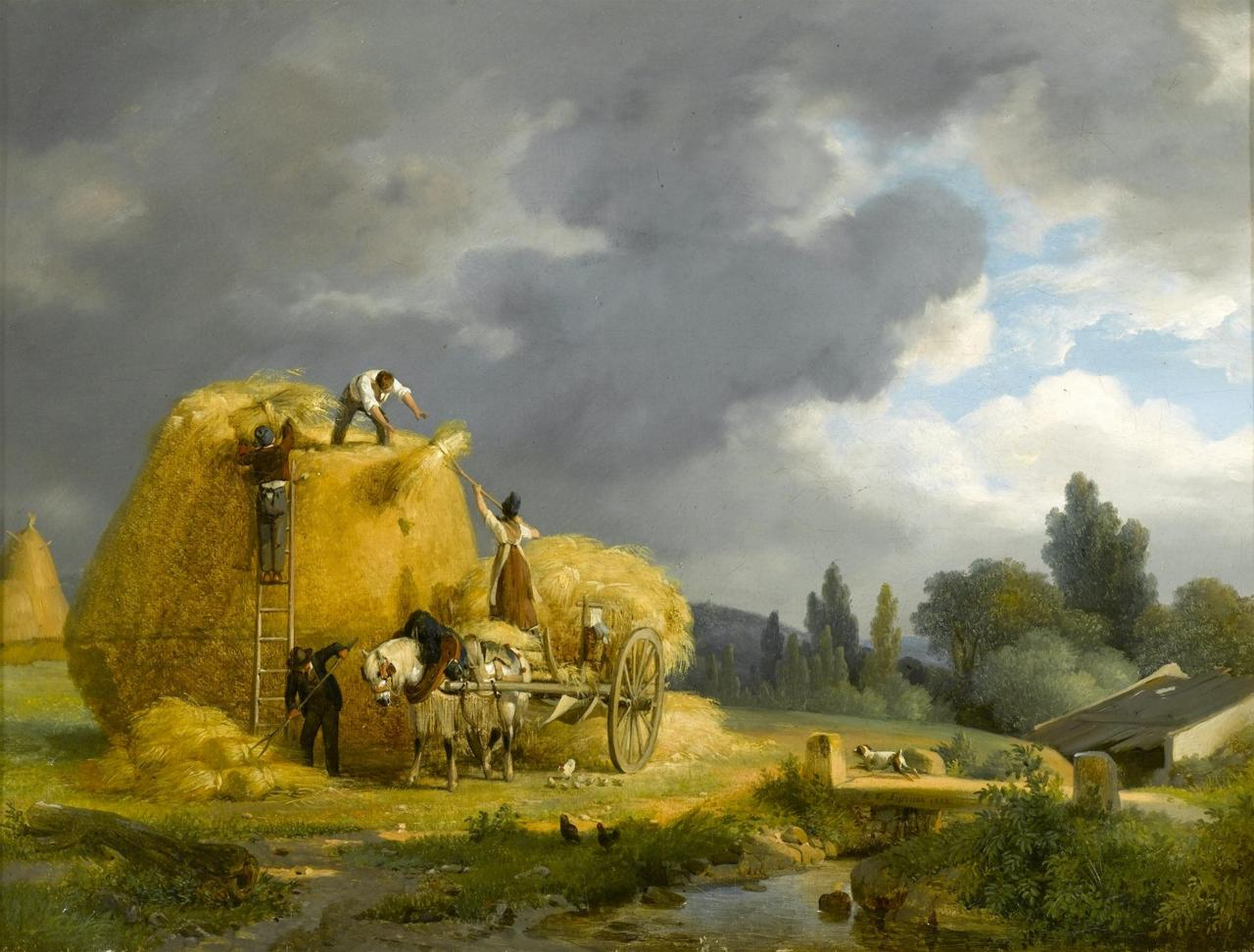
La moisson (1822) by Auguste-Xavier Leprince, oil on canvas, 24.2 x 32.1 cm, featured in her 1822 sale

Even as a member of the royal family, the Duchess of Berry was an exceptional theatre-goer. She was the patron of the Théâtre du Gymnase, which changed its name, for a time, to the théâtre de Madame, in her honor. She attended the Odéon at least nine times during 1824 to 1828. She contributed to benefit performances, such as that of Giacomo Rossini's La dame du lac (1826), for victims of the fire at Antonio Franconi's Cirque Olympique; she contributed 500 francs.

The Duchess of Berry and her first husband, Prince Charles Ferdinand of Artois, were enthusiastic art collectors. Her sale of 1822 was novel for its catalogue which contained lithographic reproductions of all the works. Lithography, invented by Alois Senefelder, had only been fully described in 1818 in Vollstandiges Lehrbuch der Steindruckerei, translated into French in 1819. The lithographs, produced by Isidore Laurent Deroy sparked an interest in the technique as a means for reproducing art.

She was a collector of landscapes; her collection featured at least three by Ruisdael. She had several genre scenes by Auguste-Xavier Leprince and she owned works by Jan van der Heyden, Michel Philibert Genod, François Marius Granet, Pauline Auzou, Jean-Claude Bonnefond, Charles Marie Bouton, Martin Drolling, Hortense Haudebourt-Lescot, Achille Etna Michallon, Paul Veronese, Titian and Bellini, among many others.

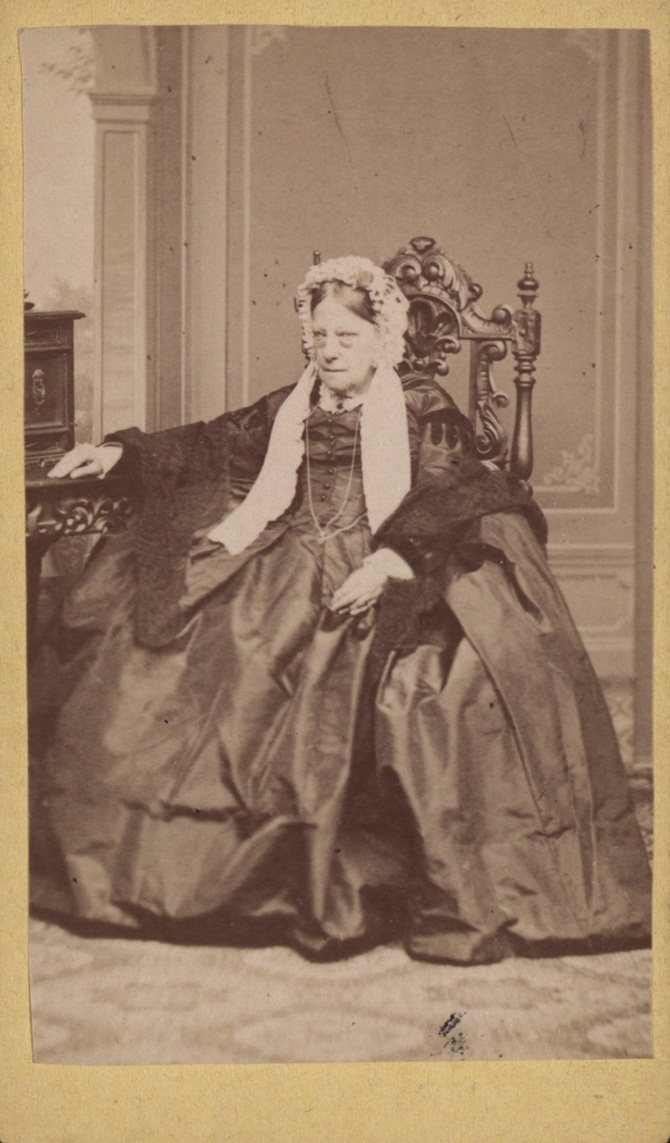
Princess Marie Caroline in her last year, 1870

The Duchess was known to patronise the Sèvres Porcelain Manufactory, commissioning notable works by Jean-Charles-François Leloy.

== Final years ==
Having lost within two months, at the beginning of 1864, her daughter, Duchess of Parma, and her second husband, who had ruined her—five million francs in debt—she had her son Count of Chambord pay her debt in exchange for the estate in Brunsee and Ca' Loredan Vendramin Calergi. She died blind on 16 April 1870, in her husband's ancestral castle of Brunsee in Styria, Austria and was buried at the cemetery of Mureck, next to her husband's father.

== Issue ==
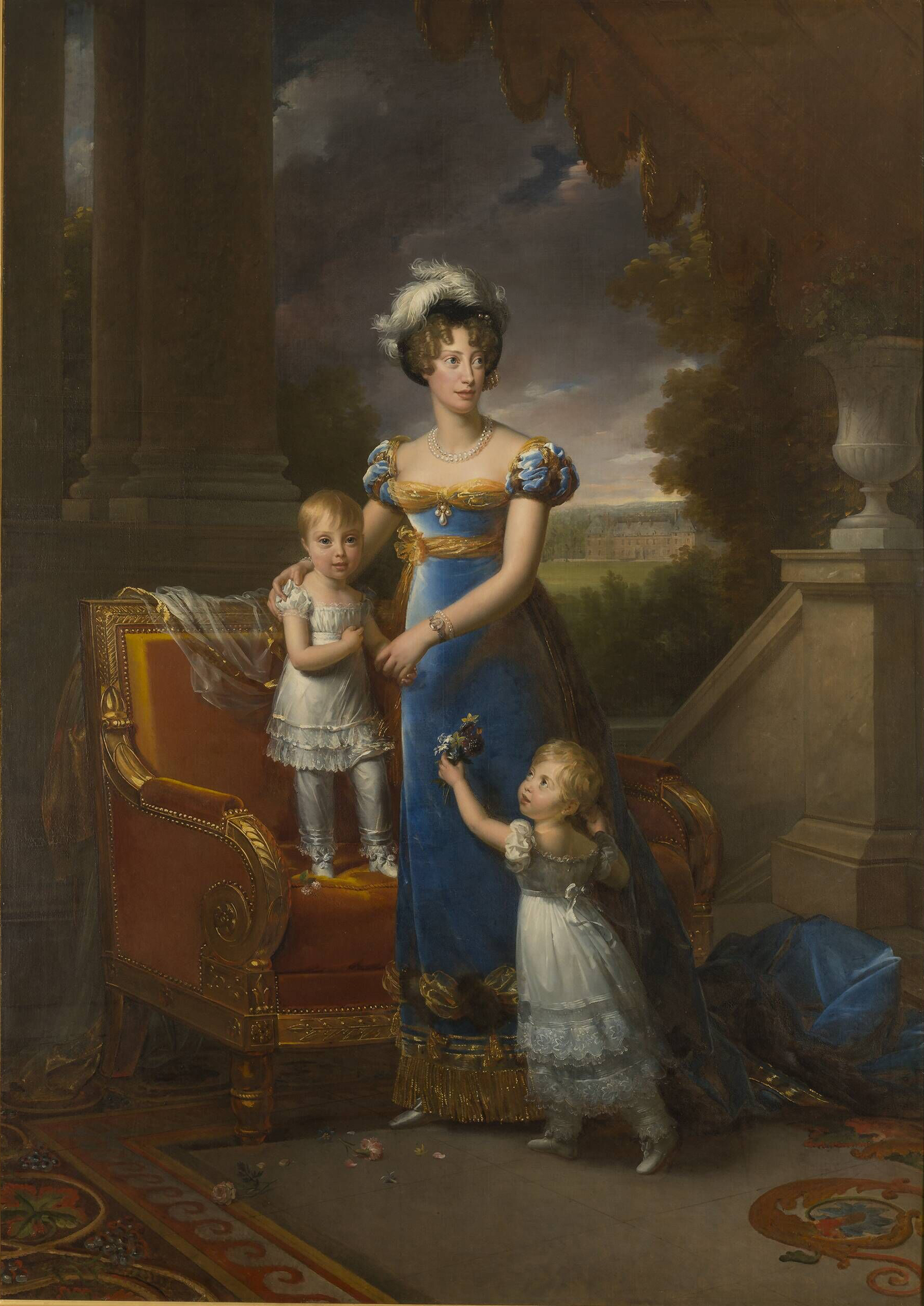
The Duchess of Berry and Her Children by François Gérard, 1820

Children with Prince Charles Ferdinand, Duke of Berry:

- Princess Louise Élisabeth (13 July 1817 – 14 July 1817)
- Prince Louis (born and died 13 September 1818)
- Princess Louise Marie Thérèse, Duchess of Parma (21 September 1819 – 1 February 1864)
- Prince Henri, Duke of Bordeaux and Count of Chambord (29 September 1820 – 24 August 1883)

Children with Ettore Lucchesi-Palli, 4th Duke of Grazia, son of Antonio Lucchesi-Palli, 7th Prince of Campofranco:

- Anna Maria Rosalia Lucchesi-Palli (10 May 1833 – 19 August 1833); born during her mother's imprisonment at Blaye, in June 1833 she was released with her and moved to Italy, where her parents placed her in the care of a foster couple until her death, aged three months.
- Maria Clementina Isabella Lucchesi-Palli (19 November 1835 – 22 March 1925), who in 1856 married Count Camille Zilleri dal Verme, the son of the great master of the court of the Princess Louise Marie Thérèse, Duchess of Parma, her half-sister, and the widow of the assassinated Charles III, Duke of Parma. In 1887, their daughter married Jaime Segismundo Álvares Pereira de Melo, Duke of Cadaval, the head of junior Miguelist branch of the House of Braganza, also known as the Brigantine dynasty. Maria Clementina and Camille are great-great-grandparents of Diana Álvares Pereira de Melo, 11th Duchess of Cadaval.
- Francesca di Paola Lucchesi-Palli (12 October 1836 – 10 May 1923), who married prince Massimo d'Arsoli in 1860. Their second son, Fabrizio married his first cousin once removed Princess Beatrice of Bourbon, Marie-Caroline's great-granddaughter by her eldest daughter Princess Louise Marie Thérèse.
- Maria Isabella Lucchesi-Palli (18 March 1838 – 1 April 1873), who married marquis Maximilien Cavriani in 1856, later married count Giovanni Battista de Conti.
- Hector Adinolfo Lucchesi-Palli, 5th Duke of Grazia, 10th Prince of Campofranco (10 March 1840 – 4 February 1911) who married Lucrezia Nicoletta, Princess Sasso-Ruffo dei principi di Sant' Antimo, the older sister of Prince Ruffo of the House of Ruffo di Calabria, the head of Motta-Bagnara branch. The Duke was the owner of Ca' Loredan Vendramin Calergi, where his mother Marie-Caroline of Bourbon-Two Sicilies, Duchess of Berry lived until her last days. They had a son Pietro Lucchesi-Pailli and a daughter Gabrielle Lucchesi-Palli (1875–1937), who in 1898 married in the chapel of this palace Girolamo Brandolini Rota, since 1914 Brandolini d'Adda, a member of the Brandolini family.
