= Archduchess Maria Clementina of Austria =

Duchess of Calabria

Maria Clementina of Austria
- Duchess of Calabria
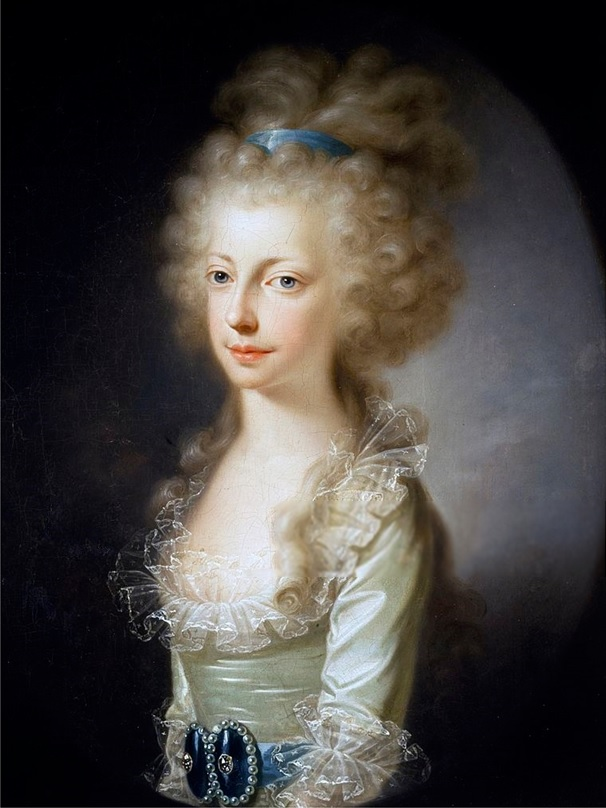
- Portrait by Joseph Hickel, 1796
- Born: 24 April 1777; Villa del Poggio Imperiale, Grand Duchy of Tuscany
- Died: 15 November 1801 (aged 24); Naples, Kingdom of Naples
- Burial: Basilica of Santa Chiara, Naples
- Spouse: Prince Francis, Duke of Calabria (m. 1797)
- Issue: Princess Caroline, Duchess of Berry; Prince Ferdinando, Duke of Noto
Names
- Marie Klementine Josepha Johanna Fidelis
- House: Habsburg-Lorraine
- Father: Leopold II, Holy Roman Emperor
- Mother: Maria Luisa of Spain

Maria Clementina of Austria (24 April 1777 – 15 November 1801) was an Austrian archduchess and the tenth child and third daughter of Leopold II, Holy Roman Emperor and Maria Luisa of Spain. In 1797, she married her double first cousin Prince Francis, Duke of Calabria, heir to the kingdoms of Naples and Sicily. She was modest, well educated and kind, becoming popular in her adoptive country. Afflicted with frail health, she died of tuberculosis at 24. Her only surviving child was Princess Caroline, Duchess of Berry.

== Early life ==
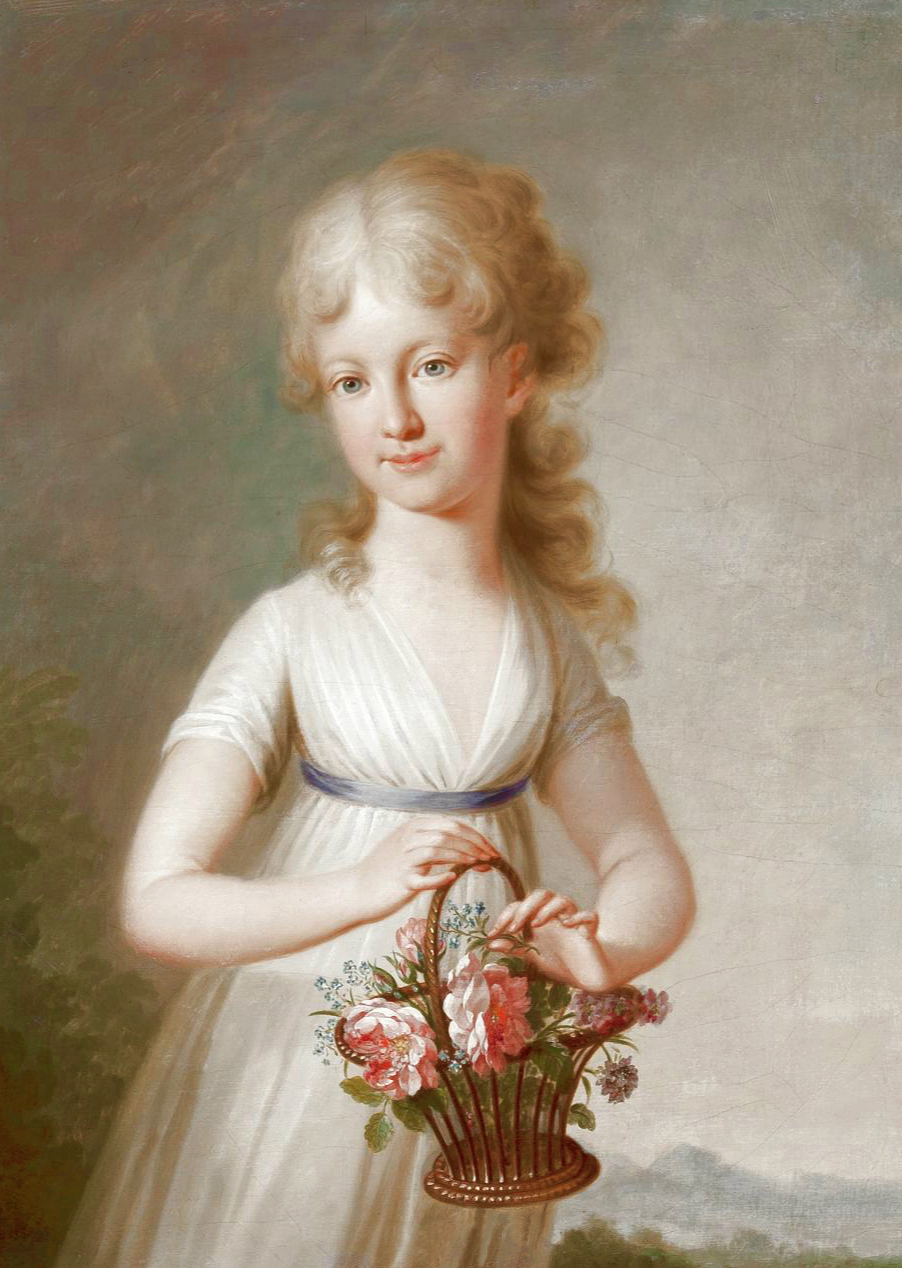
Portrait of Maria Clementina as a young girl by Joseph Hickel.

Archduchess Maria Clementina was born at the Villa del Poggio Imperiale, then located in the Grand Duchy of Tuscany, which had been ruled by her father Leopold I, Grand Duke of Tuscany (later Holy Roman Emperor) since 1765. She was named after Prince Clemens Wenceslaus of Saxony, her mother's uncle and brother of Maria Amalia of Saxony, Maria Clementina's maternal grandmother.

Her father was a son of Empress Maria Theresa and her mother a daughter of Charles III of Spain and Maria Amalia of Saxony. Maria Clementina was her parents' tenth child among sixteen children. She was raised in the Grand Duchy of Tuscany where her father ruled and the family lived until 1790 when, at the death of Maria Clementina's paternal uncle, Joseph II, her father became Emperor of the Holy Roman Empire and the family moved to the court of Vienna.

In the same year, 1790, she was engaged to Francis, Hereditary Prince of Naples, eldest surviving son of Ferdinand IV of Naples and his consort, Maria Carolina of Austria. Prince Francis was the Heir apparent to both the Neapolitan and Sicilian thrones. They were double first cousins as they shared all their grandparents in common. Their union was the last of three between the Austrian and Neapolitan royal families, the previous two being between Archduke Francis, her oldest brother and Maria Theresa of Naples and Sicily in 1790 after Archduke Ferdinand and Luisa of Naples and Sicily.

The marriage by proxy took place on 19 September 1790. It was a turbulent period with the Napoleonic Wars afflicting the Italian peninsula and the actual wedding did not occur for several years. In the meantime, both of Maria Clementina's parents died in 1792, in a short period of time, and her brother Francis became the new Emperor. A truce with France finally allowed Maria Clementina to travel to Naples in 1797. A frigate picked her up in Trieste, and her new family awaited her at Foggia where the wedding took place on 26 June 1797. It was a simple event since it was war time.

== Hereditary Princess ==
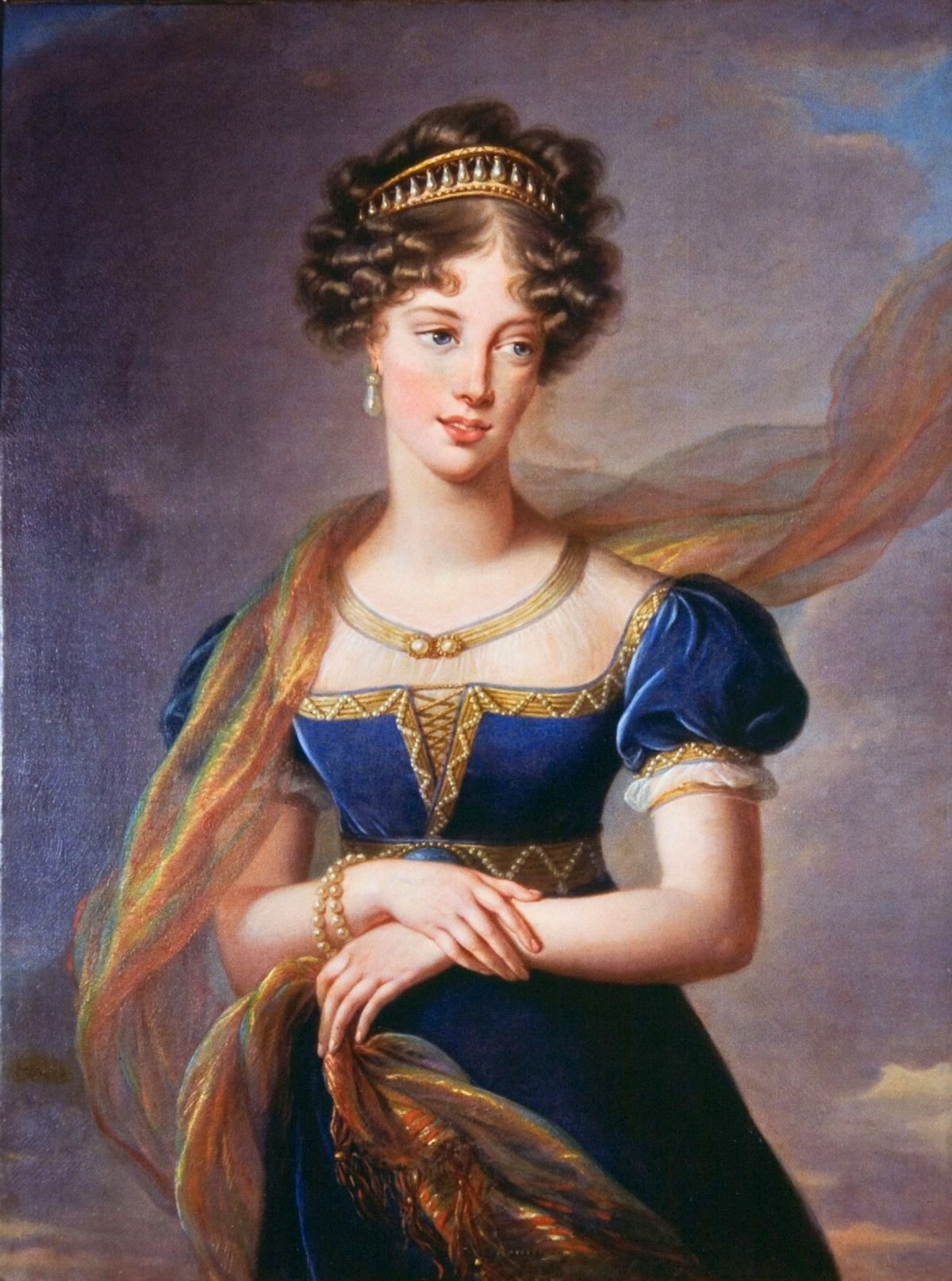
Portrait of the Duchess of Berry by Élisabeth Vigée Le Brun, 1824. Her only daughter, who married into the French royal family.

Maria Clementina was considered to be rather pretty, though unfortunately marked by smallpox, but was regal in her bearing. "My son loves her passionately and she reciprocates," wrote the Queen of Naples, her mother-in-law, adding that: "It is a pleasure to see them harmonize so well... I am delighted with the Princess, gentle, fresh sensible and accommodating." However, Maria Clementina was homesick and her character was sullen and reserved. Some weeks later Queen Maria Carolina added about the couple: "Her husband is her husband two or three times in twenty four hours, a matter which interests her. In spite of this, there is a sadness, a boredom, an invincible disgust. I think it must be due to her health or it is unnatural, she has no taste for anything at all. It is not that she regrets her life in Vienna.... I will do everything for her happiness, although I am sowing amid brambles and on thorny soil. But she is my son's wife. Thanks to my training the young man is very much in love with her as a woman... but this may not last with so much disgust, boredom and no charm of feature, which he is fortunately too nice to notice... I shall try to win her confidence, but I am not sure of succeeding. All her wants are anticipated; nothing is lacking; she is discontented and everybody notices it."

Maria Clementina was dignified and kind. Better educated and more intelligent than her placid husband, she dominated him. The couple got along well. "Her husband adores her in every sense of the word. He says she loves him, and assuredly shows and demands many proofs of love" wrote the Queen of Naples. The couple's marital passion astonished the Queen who: "asked heaven to calm their over-excited senses by sending them children". Like her husband, Maria Clementina cared little for court life. She preferred family games, moonlit walks on the terrace, and conversation.

They had two children. She died in Naples the year after she gave birth to a son. She is thought to have died from lung disease or tuberculosis, leaving behind her daughter and her devastated husband. She was buried in Basilica of Santa Chiara, Naples, with her son.

After her death, her husband married Infanta María Isabel of Spain, again his first cousin, the youngest surviving daughter of Charles IV of Spain (brother of Maria Clementina's mother) and Maria Luisa of Parma.

Her only daughter, Maria Carolina, married Charles Ferdinand, Duke of Berry in April 1816. He was the son of Charles X of France and Princess Maria Theresa of Savoy. The couple were the parents of the French pretender Henri d'Artois, comte de Chambord and the Duchess of Parma making Maria Clementina an ancestress of the present Duke of Calabria.

== Issue ==
1. Princess Caroline of Naples and Sicily (5 November 1798 – 17 April 1870) married Prince Charles Ferdinand, Duke of Berry and had issue; married secondly, Ettore Lucchesi-Palli, 8th Duke della Grazia and had issue.
2. Prince Ferdinando, Duke of Noto (27 August 1800 – 1 July 1801) died in infancy.

== Ancestry ==
Ancestors of Archduchess Maria Clementina of Austria

16. Charles V, Duke of Lorraine
8. Leopold, Duke of Lorraine
17. Eleanor of Austria
4. Francis I, Holy Roman Emperor
18. Philippe I, Duke of Orléans
9. Élisabeth Charlotte of Orléans
19. Elisabeth Charlotte of the Palatinate
2. Leopold II, Holy Roman Emperor
20. Leopold I, Holy Roman Emperor
10. Charles VI, Holy Roman Emperor
21. Eleonore Magdalene of Neuburg
5. Maria Theresa of Austria
22. Louis Rudolph, Duke of Brunswick-Wolfenbüttel
11. Elisabeth Christine of Brunswick
23. Christine Louise of Oettingen-Oettingen
1. Archduchess Maria Clementina of Austria
24. Louis, Dauphin of France
12. Philip V of Spain
25. Maria Anna Victoria of Bavaria
6. Charles III of Spain
26. Odoardo Farnese, Hereditary Prince of Parma
13. Elisabeth Farnese
27. Dorothea Sophie of Neuburg
3. Maria Luisa of Spain
28. Augustus II of Poland
14. Augustus III of Poland
29. Christiane Eberhardine of Bayreuth
7. Maria Amalia of Saxony
30. Joseph I, Holy Roman Emperor
15. Maria Josepha of Austria
31. Wilhelmina Amalia of Brunswick
