= Eichfeld =

- Former municipality
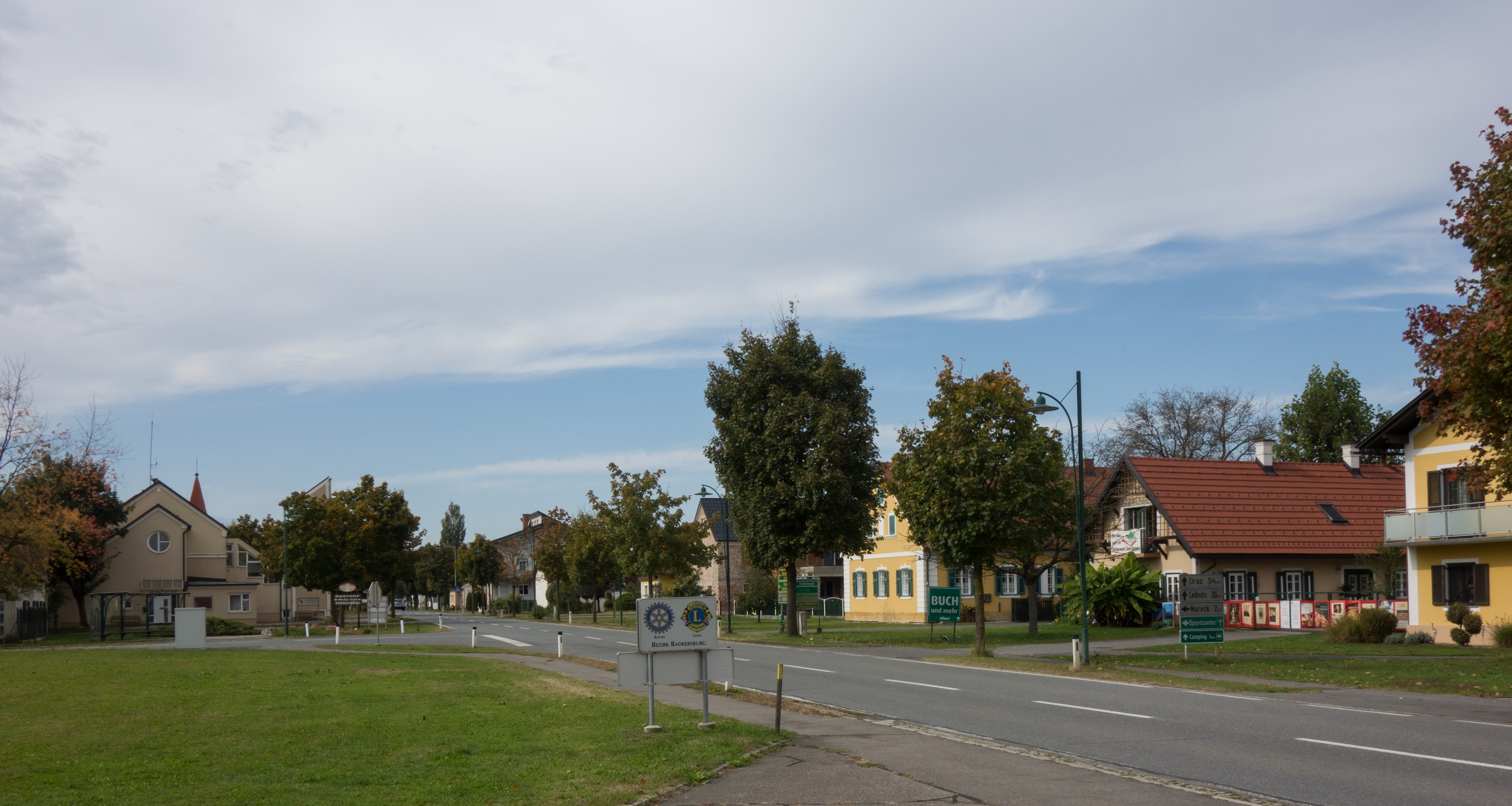
- Street in Eichfeld

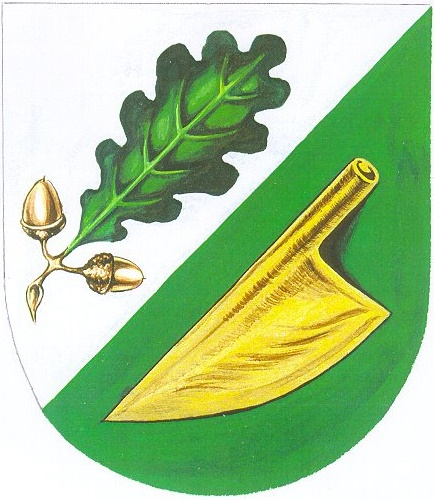
- Coat of arms

- Location within Austria
- Coordinates: 46°43′29.58″N 15°46′06.28″E
- Country: Austria
- State: Styria
- District: Südoststeiermark

Area
  - Total: 17.98 km^{2} (6.94 sq mi)
- Elevation: 238 m (781 ft)

Population (1 January 2016)
  - Total: 887
  - Density: 49.3/km^{2} (128/sq mi)
- Time zone: UTC+1 (CET)
  - Summer (DST): UTC+2 (CEST)
- Postal code: 8480, 8482
- Area code: 03472
- Vehicle registration: RA
- Website: www.eichfeld.at

Eichfeld is a town in the district of Südoststeiermark in Styria in Austria. The villages of Hainsdorf-Brunnsee and Oberrakitsch are located within the town. On 1 January 2015, administrative reform actions in Styria merged the towns of Mureck, Gosdorf, and Eichfeld, which includes the villages of Hainsdorf-Brunnsee and Oberrakitsch. The new municipality is called Mureck.

== Population ==
Historical population
Year	Pop.	±%
1869	1,443	—
1880	1,369	−5.1%
1890	1,396	+2.0%
1900	1,346	−3.6%
1910	1,318	−2.1%
1923	1,246	−5.5%
1934	1,256	+0.8%
1939	1,224	−2.5%
1951	1,201	−1.9%
1961	1,090	−9.2%
1971	1,056	−3.1%
1981	1,067	+1.0%
1991	995	−6.7%
2001	973	−2.2%
2012	887	−8.8%
