= The Duchess of Berry and Her Children =

Painting by François Gérard

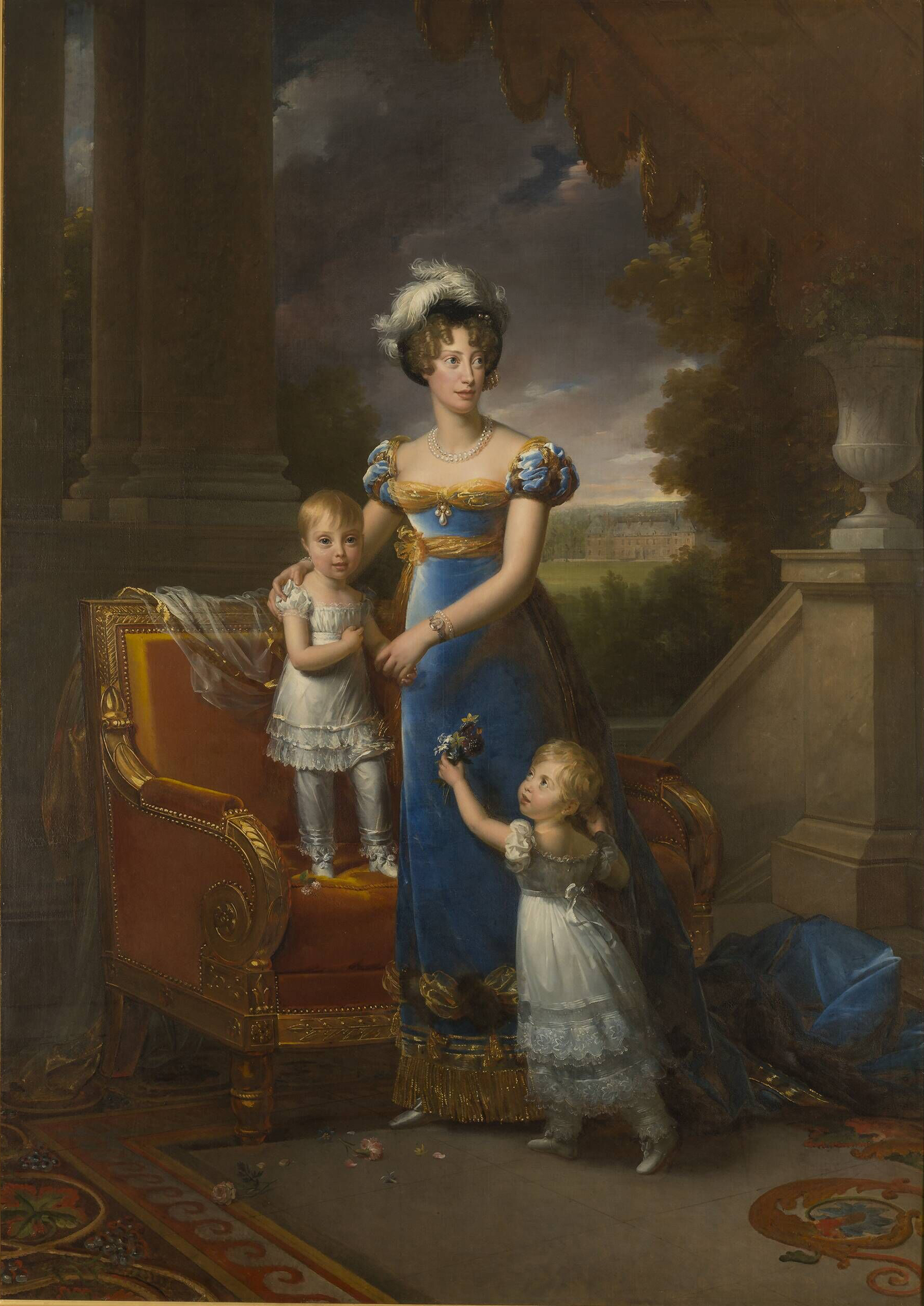
- Artist: François Gérard
- Year: c.1822
- Type: Oil on canvas, portrait painting
- Dimensions: 275 cm × 181 cm (108 in × 71 in)
- Location: Palace of Versailles, Versailles

The Duchess of Berry and Her Children (French: Portrait of la duchesse de Berry et ses enfants) is an c.1822 portrait painting by the French artist François Gérard. It depicts the widowed Duchess of Berry with her two children Louise and Henri. She had married the younger son of the Count of Artois, brother of the childless Louis XVIII, in 1816. Her residence the Château de Rosny-sur-Seine can be seen in the background.

Following the Duke of Berry's assassination in February 1820, it looked as the continued rule of the Bourbon family was in doubt, but the Duchess gave birth to his posthumous son Henry who seemingly secured the future of the dynasty. Gérard has been a leading painter of the Napoleonic era but was able to be successfully continue his career following the Bourbon Restoration. While the painting is sometimes dated 1820, the size of Henri (born in September 1820) and the absence of mourning suggest it was produced slightly later. The work was exhibited at the Salon of 1822 at the Louvre in Paris. Today it is in the collection of the Palace of Versailles having been purchased in 1837 for 10,000 Francs from the artist's widow by Louis Philippe I during the July Monarchy. The Duchess also appeared in the 1824 Portrait of the Duchess of Berry by Élisabeth Vigée Le Brun.

== See also ==
- Portrait of the Duchess of Berry, an 1825 painting by Thomas Lawrence

== Bibliography ==
- Pomeroy, Jordana. Daring: The Life and Art of Elisabeth Vigée Le Brun. ISBN 1947440101. J. Paul Getty Trust, 2025.
- Skuy, David. Assassination, Politics and Miracles: France and the Royalist Reaction of 1820. ISBN 0773524576. McGill-Queen's University Press, 2003.
- Price, Munro. The Perilous Crown: France Between Revolutions, 1814-1848. ISBN 1405040823. Pan Macmillan, 2010.
