= The Duchess of Berry Presenting the Duke of Bordeaux =

Painting by Charles-Nicolas Lafond

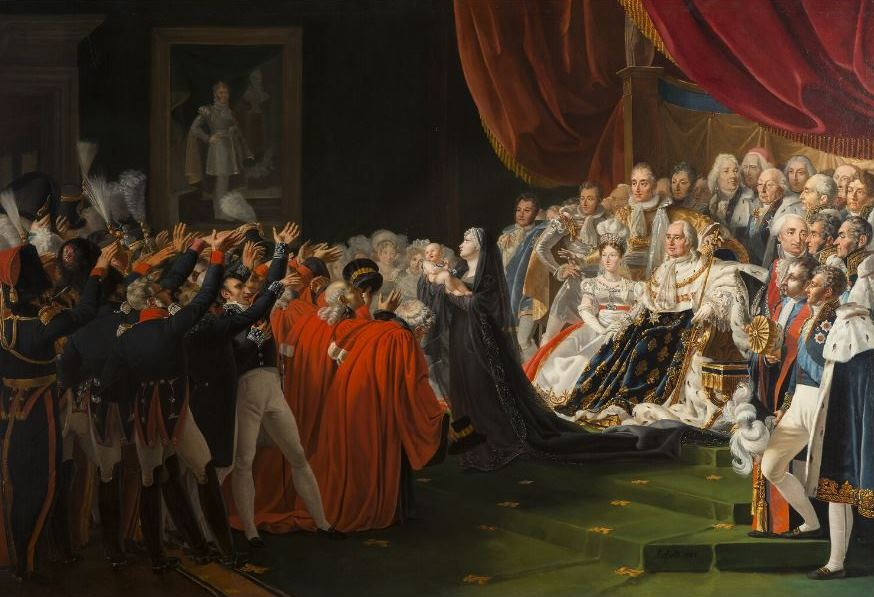
- Artist: Charles-Nicolas Lafond
- Year: 1821
- Type: Oil on canvas, history painting
- Dimensions: 138 cm × 195.5 cm (54 in × 77.0 in)
- Location: Palace of Versailles, Versailles

The Duchess of Berry Presenting the Duke of Bordeaux (French: La duchesse de Berry présente le duc de Bordeaux) is an 1821 history painting by the French artist Charles-Nicolas Lafond. It portrays the moment that the widowed Duchess of Berry presents her young son the Duke of Bordeaux to the French court. The assembled crowd, led by the boy's great uncle Louis XVIII, respond with delight. The Duke of Berry had been assassinated by a Bonapartist at the Paris Opera in February 1820. Seven month's later his wife gave birth to a son, considered a miracle baby as it seemed to secure the succession of the House of Bourbon for another generation. In the event, the family was overthrown in the July Revolution of 1830 and Bordeaux spent most of his life in exile.

Amongst others depicted are the future Charles X of France, Marie Thérèse of France, the Duke of Angoulême, the Prince of Condé and Talleyrand. In the background hangs the Portrait of the Duke of Berry by François Gérard, which the Duke sat for the year of his assassination. It was exhibited at the Salon of 1822. Today it is in the collection of the Palace of Versailles.

== See also ==
- The Death of the Duke of Berry, an 1824 painting by Alexandre Menjaud

== Bibliography ==
- Pène, Henri. Henri de France. H. Oudin, 1884.
- Price, Munro. The Perilous Crown: France Between Revolutions, 1814-1848. Pan Macmillan, 2010.
