= Château de Rosny-sur-Seine =

- Location within France

General information
- Type: château
- Architectural style: Louis XIII
- Location: France
- Coordinates: 49°0′12″N 1°37′49″E
- Construction started: ca. 1598
- Completed: 1828

Design and construction
- Architect: Joseph-Antoine Froelicher

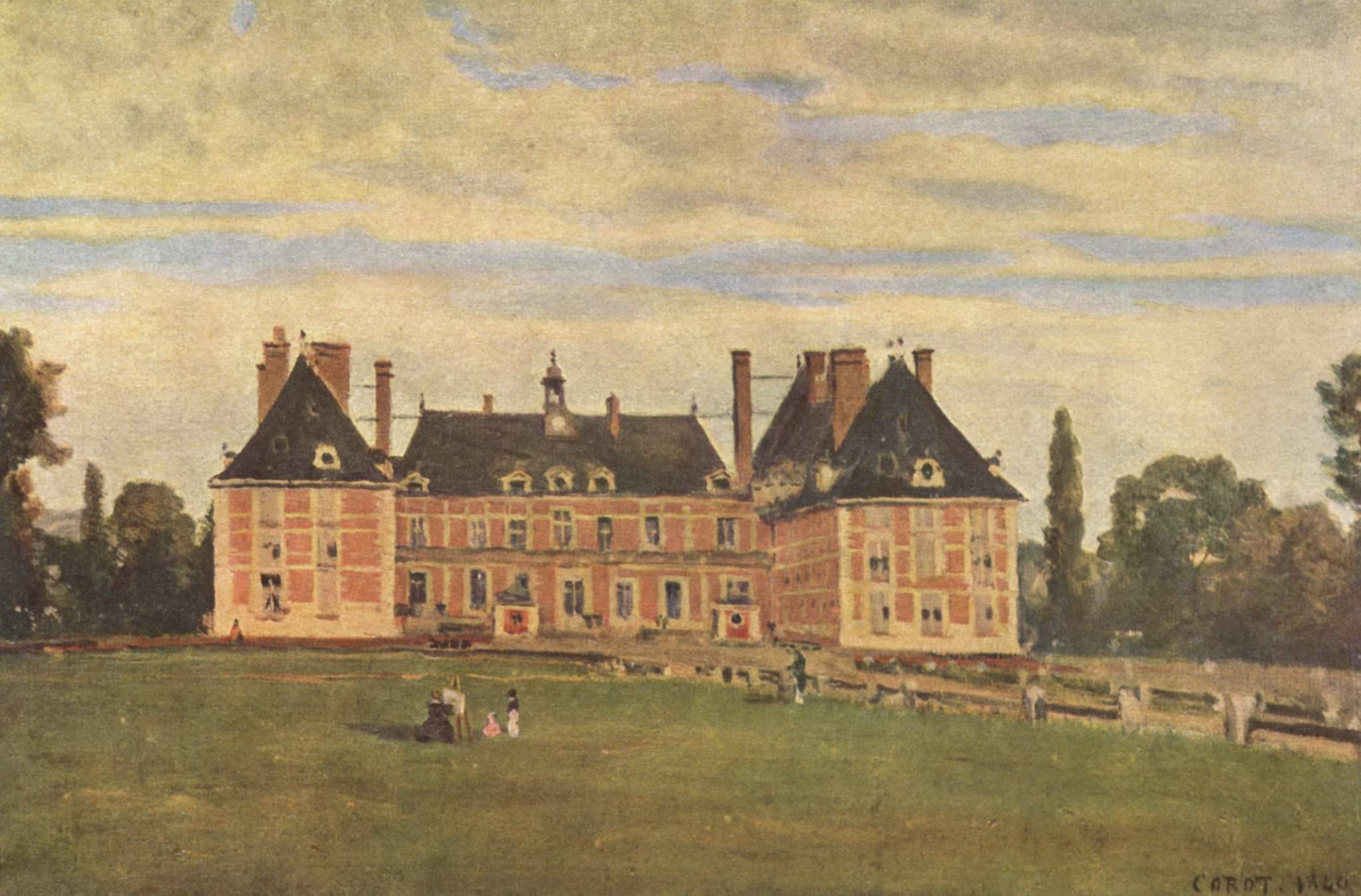
Château de Rosny, by Jean-Baptiste-Camille Corot, 1840

The Château de Rosny-sur-Seine is a château in the Louis XIII style, situated in Rosny-sur-Seine in Yvelines, on the left bank of the Seine, at a short driving distance from Paris by the road to Rouen. It is famous as the seat of Maximilien de Béthune, duc de Sully, who retired to the old château to heal from his wounds at the battle of Ivry, 1590, and constructed the present building on old foundations in the closing years of the 16th century. It went through several substantial alterations in the 19th and 20th centuries, and a period of neglect in the 1980s and 1990s. As of 2004, it is under renovation.

== History ==
The château was built of bricks and limestone by Maximilien de Béthune, duke of Sully, on the site of an old fortified manor that had been dismantled and burned in 1435. In 1529, the old building passed by marriage to Jean de Béthune, the grandfather of Sully, who was born at the old house, but it was modest by the standards of the day, and he had it replaced in the last years of the 16th century with a new building more befitting his high rank. He is reputed to have ceased building in 1610 at the death of Henri IV, who had visited him there and whose monogram appears on the decorated joists of a room there.

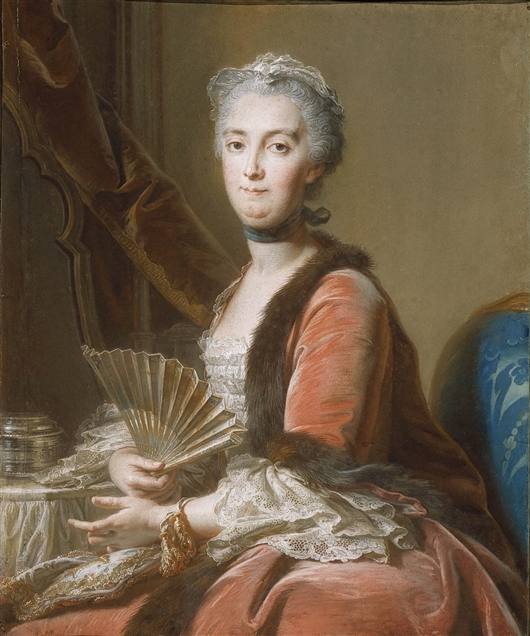
Portrait of the Countess of Sénozan (ca. 1751) by Jean Valade

In 1709, the estate passed into the hands of the Olivier family. The château was inherited in 1740 by Jean-Antoine Olivier de Sénozan (1713-1778), from his brother François Olivier. He took up permanent residence there in 1753, with his wife the Countess of Sénozan (1718-1794). She was older sister to jurist, statesman and botanist Malesherbes. He was a frequent visitor to the estate. After Jean-Antoine's death in 1778, she seems to have returned to Paris, where she was executed in May 1794, on charges of conspiracy against the state.

The estate went to Madeleine Olivier de Senozan de Viriville (1764–1794), whose son, Edmond de Talleyrand-Périgord, sold it in 1817 to a Parisian merchant. From him it was purchased on 14 August 1818 by Charles Ferdinand, duc de Berry at a cost of 2.5 million francs. It was his summer residence until he was assassinated on 13 February 1820. Caroline Ferdinande Louise, duchesse de Berry then became châtelaine of Rosny. In 1826, she employed the architect Joseph-Antoine Froelicher to complete the construction of the wings that had been left unfinished by Sully after the death of Henri IV.

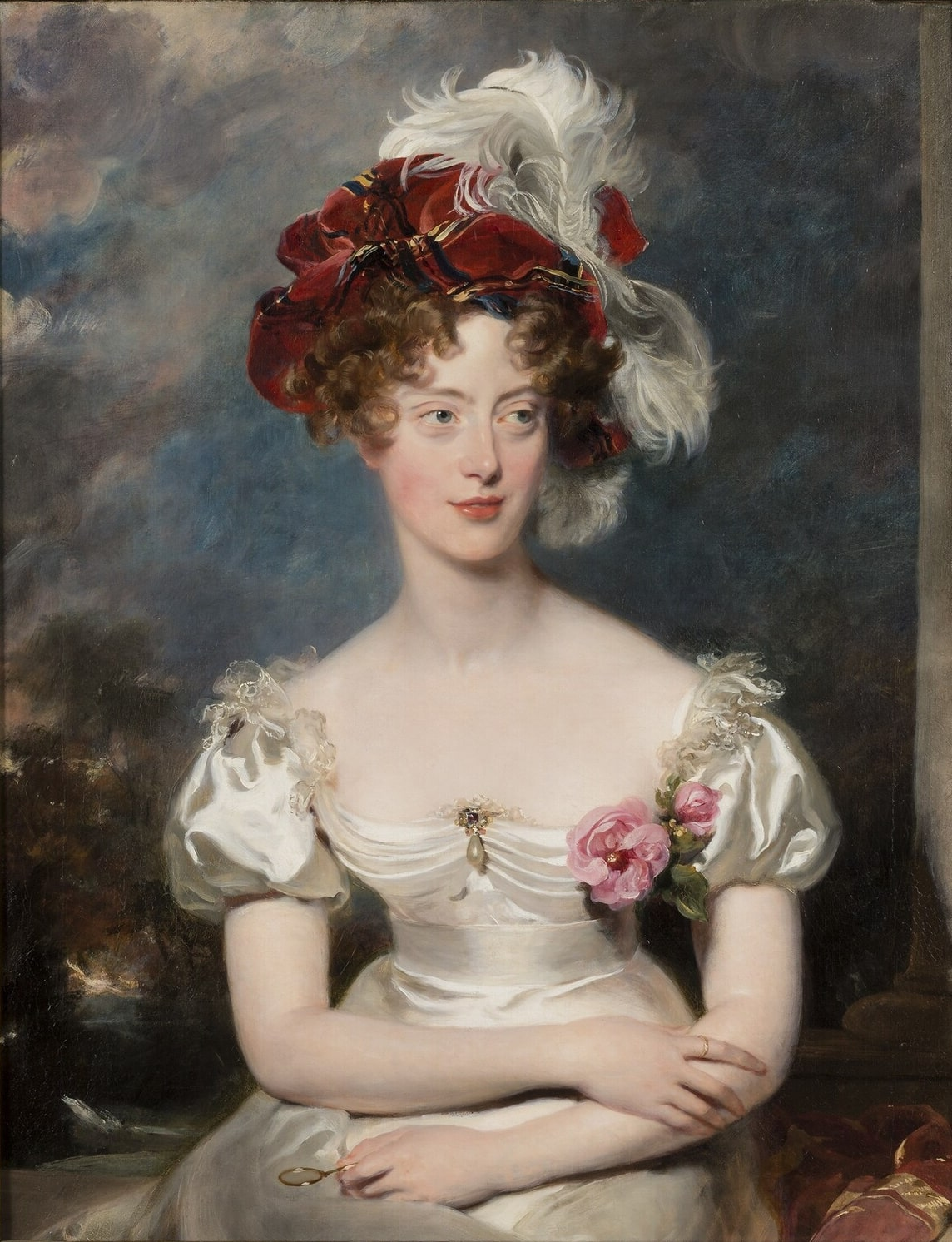
Portrait of the Duchess of Berry by Thomas Lawrence, 1825

When she left France with Charles X in 1830, she bequeathed the château and recommended the staff to her aunt, Queen Marie-Amélie. (Note: On 7 August 1830, she wrote to her of the Merlerault: "I count in this occasion on your kindness and friendship to me, like you to that of your husband. Believe me, my dear aunt, your affectionate and obedient niece. Caroline. P.S. I recommend to you, dear aunt, all the people of my house, and I will be obliged to you for all that you will be able to do for them." Marie-Amélie responded on 12 August: "I will add that we did not need to know your desire in this respect. The heart of my husband as mine had carried us to occupy it; as of the first moment, he ordered that a safeguard be sent to Rosny. All has been respected there and all is there in the best state possible" (citation from: Guy Antonetti, Louis-Philippe, Paris, Librairie Arthème Fayard, 2002, p. 601 – ISBN 2-213-59222-5)) When she had lost any hope of returning to France, after her exile, she sold the château and its property in 1836 to an English banker, who yielded in his turn to an anonymous company of businessmen. The property was then parceled out, and the château was slated to be dismantled. In 1840, the comte Le Marois acquired the estate, and saved the building from total destruction. The new owner, finding the residence too large for his use, demolished the wings built by the Duchess of Berry, leaving the remainder of the construction its current state.

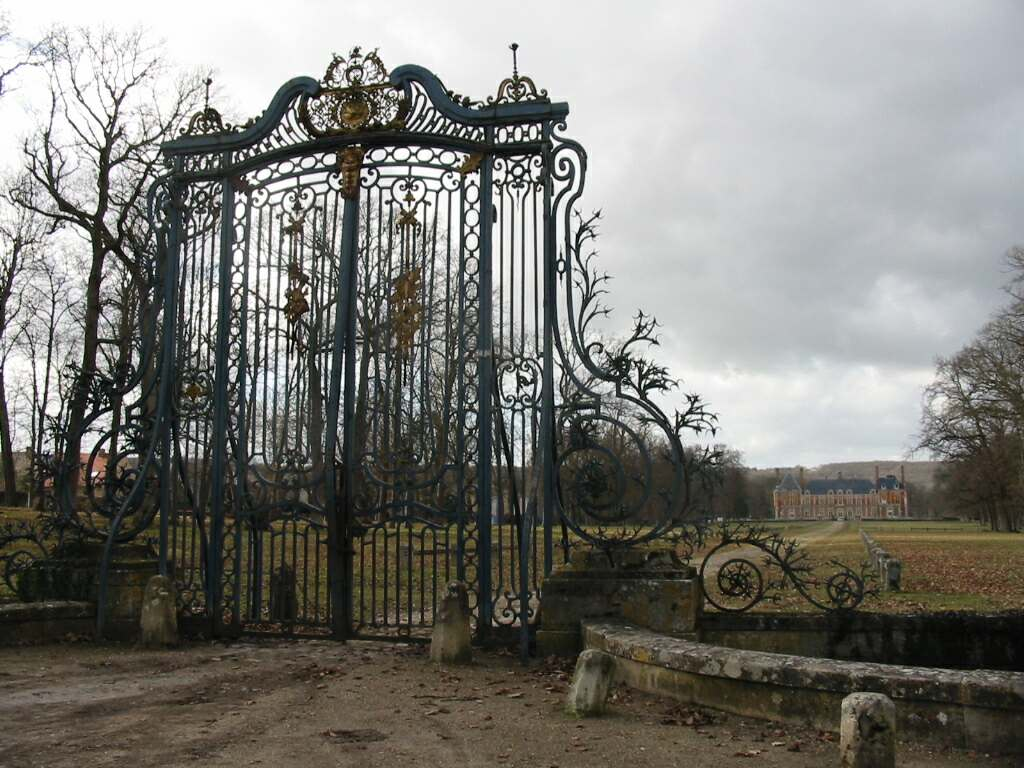
The château (in 2006) with François Olivier's iron grillwork gate bearing the family arms

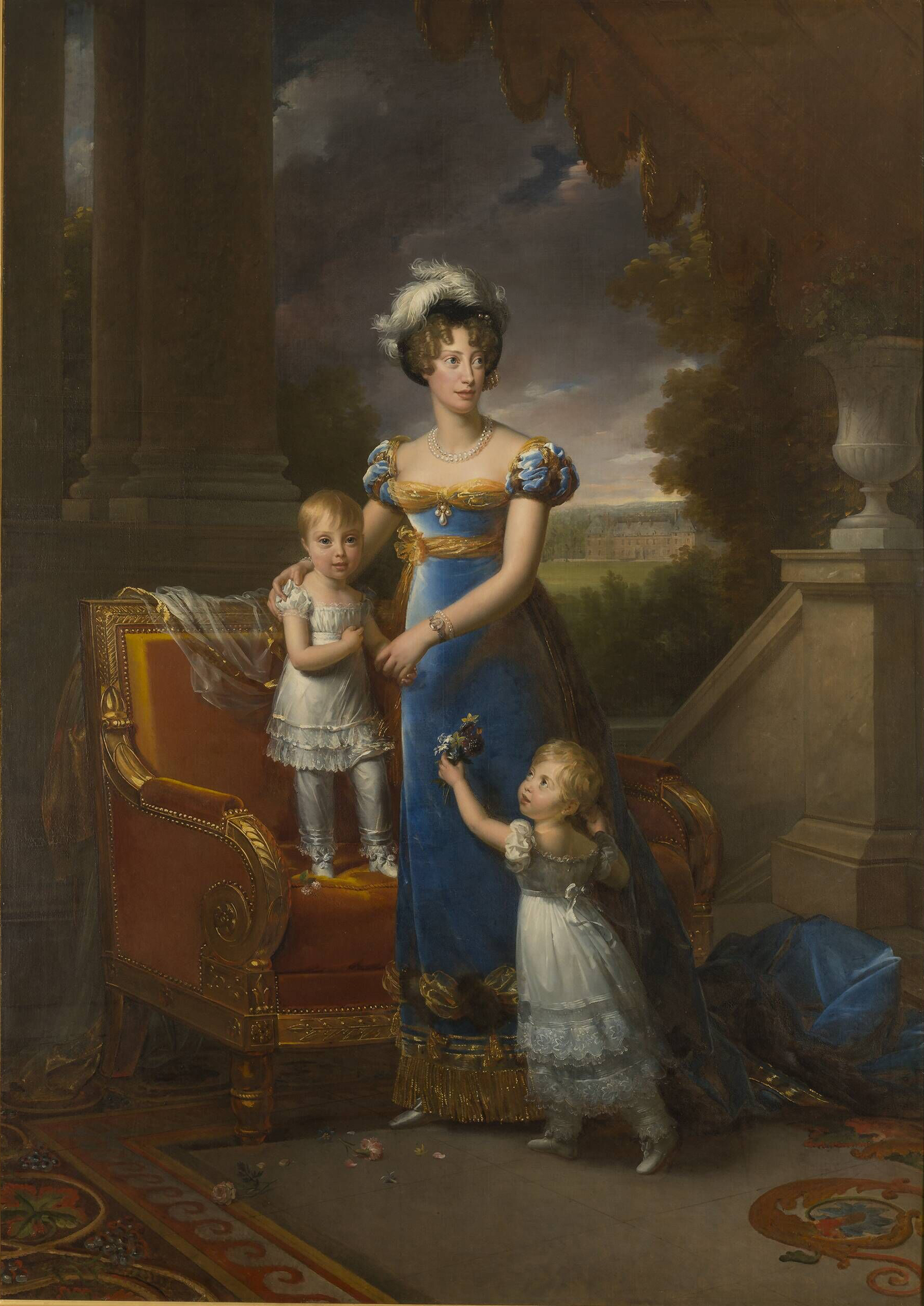
The Duchess of Berry and Her Children by François Gérard, 1822. The Château can be seen in the background

The Château of the Duchess of Berry by Richard Parkes Bonington, 1825

From the 19th century until 1955, the château and the property belonged to the Lebaudy family, who arranged the commons to lodge their stables, and their kennels, since they practised fox hunting in the surrounding forests. The château was classified a monument historique in 1941. It hosted the 11th World Scout Conference in 1947.

The château was bought in 1955 by Doctor Hertz, who arranged in the commons a center of functional rehabilitation (currently APARC), he and later his widow, continued to live in the château until August 1984.

The château was acquired in December 1984 by a Japanese company, the Nippon Sangyo Kabushiki Kaisha and it underwent various degradations, including a fire in January 1997. It was largely stripped of its furniture, tapestries, chimneypieces, ornaments, statues, woodwork and even of certain trees from its parks, which were sold through auctions. It was repossessed by the State, and conservation work was undertaken by the French Ministry of Culture and Communication.

Since 1999, the château has belonged to a private owner who wishes to make it a relais-château to accommodate overnight tourists. The work is still in progress, and the château is not open to the public.
