= Portrait of the Duke of Berry =

Painting by François Gérard

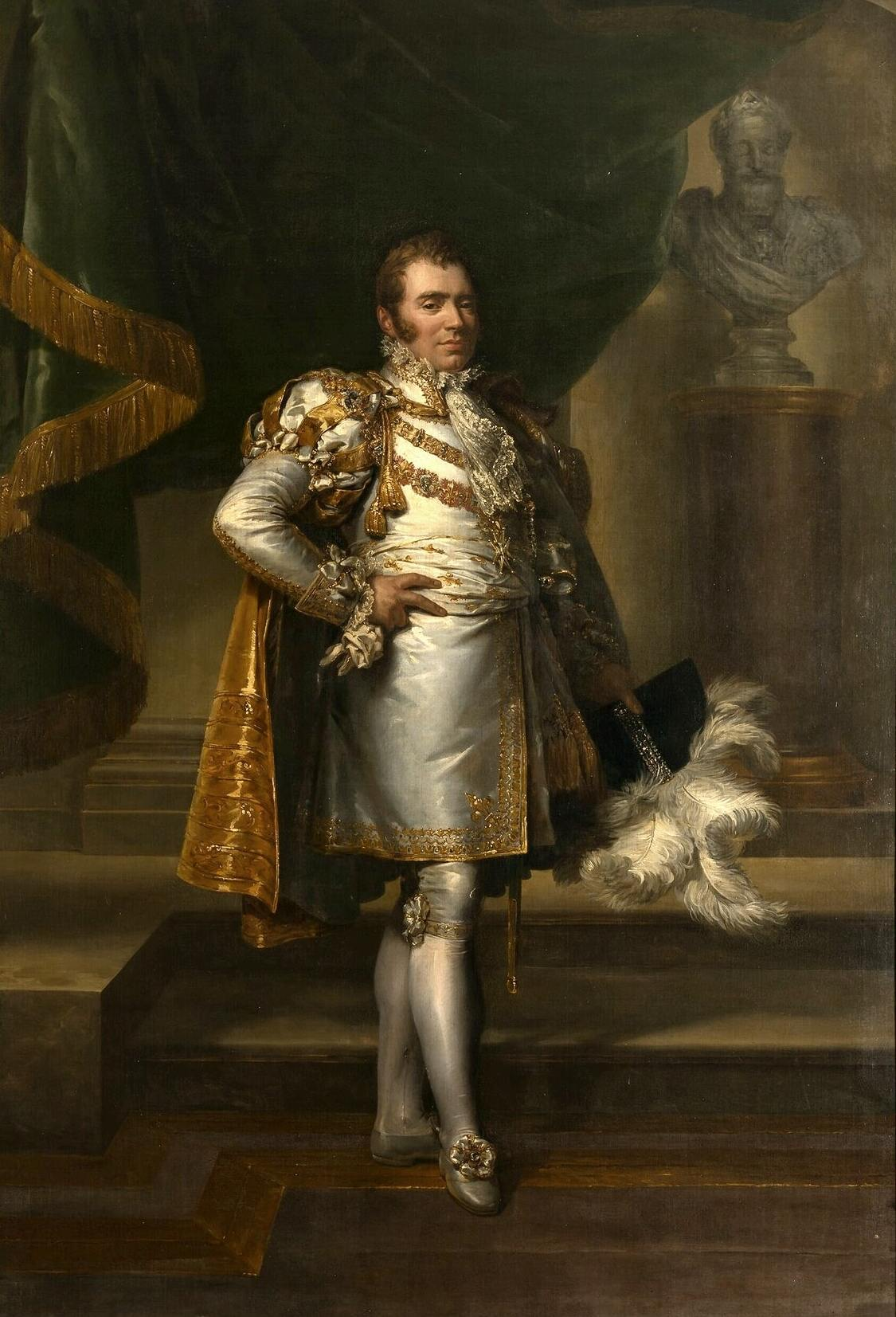
- Artist: François Gérard
- Year: 1820
- Type: Oil on canvas, portrait painting
- Dimensions: 243 cm × 164 cm (96 in × 65 in)
- Location: Palace of Versailles, Versailles

Portrait of the Duke of Berry is an oil on canvas portrait painting by the French artist François Gérard, from 1820.

== History and description ==
It depicts Charles Ferdinand, Duke of Berry, the second son of the future Charles X of France who was then Count of Artois. Berry was the nephew of the reigning monarch Louis XVIII, who had come to throne following the defeat of Napoleon's Empire.

A prominent figure of Restoration France, Berry was assassinated by a Bonapartist Louis Pierre Louvel the year of the painting. Stabbed and mortally wounded while leaving the opera in Paris, he died the following day. Eight months after his death, his Italian wife Marie-Caroline gave birth to a son Henry, Duke of Bordeaux who seemingly secured the succession of the House of Bourbon for a further generation. In the event the family's rule ended when they were overthrown by the July Revolution in 1830.

Today the painting is in the collection of the Palace of Versailles outside Paris. It is featured in the 1821 painting The Duchess of Berry Presenting the Duke of Bordeaux by Charles-Nicolas Lafond. Gérard's colleague Alexandre Menjaud produced a work The Death of the Duke of Berry depicting Berry's deathbed scene which is also now at Versailles.

== See also ==
- The Death of the Duke of Berry, an 1824 painting by Alexandre Menjaud
- Portrait of the Duchess of Berry, an 1825 painting of the Duke's wife by Thomas Lawrence

== Bibliography ==
- Allard, Sébastien, Loyrette, Henri & Des Cars, Laurence. Nineteenth Century French Art: From Romanticism to Impressionism, Post-Impressionism and Art Nouveau. ISBN 2080305328. Rizzoli International Publications, 2007.
- Hobbs, Jeffrey B. The Duchesse de Berry in Captivity: Political Legitimacy and the Nation State in 1830's France. University of Wisconsin, 2007.
- Price, Munro. The Perilous Crown: France Between Revolutions, 1814-1848. ISBN 1405040823. Pan Macmillan, 2010.
- Strieter, Terry W. Nineteenth-Century European Art: A Topical Dictionary. ISBN 0861721152. Bloomsbury Academic, 1999.
