= Assassination of the Duke of Berry =

1820 political murder in Paris

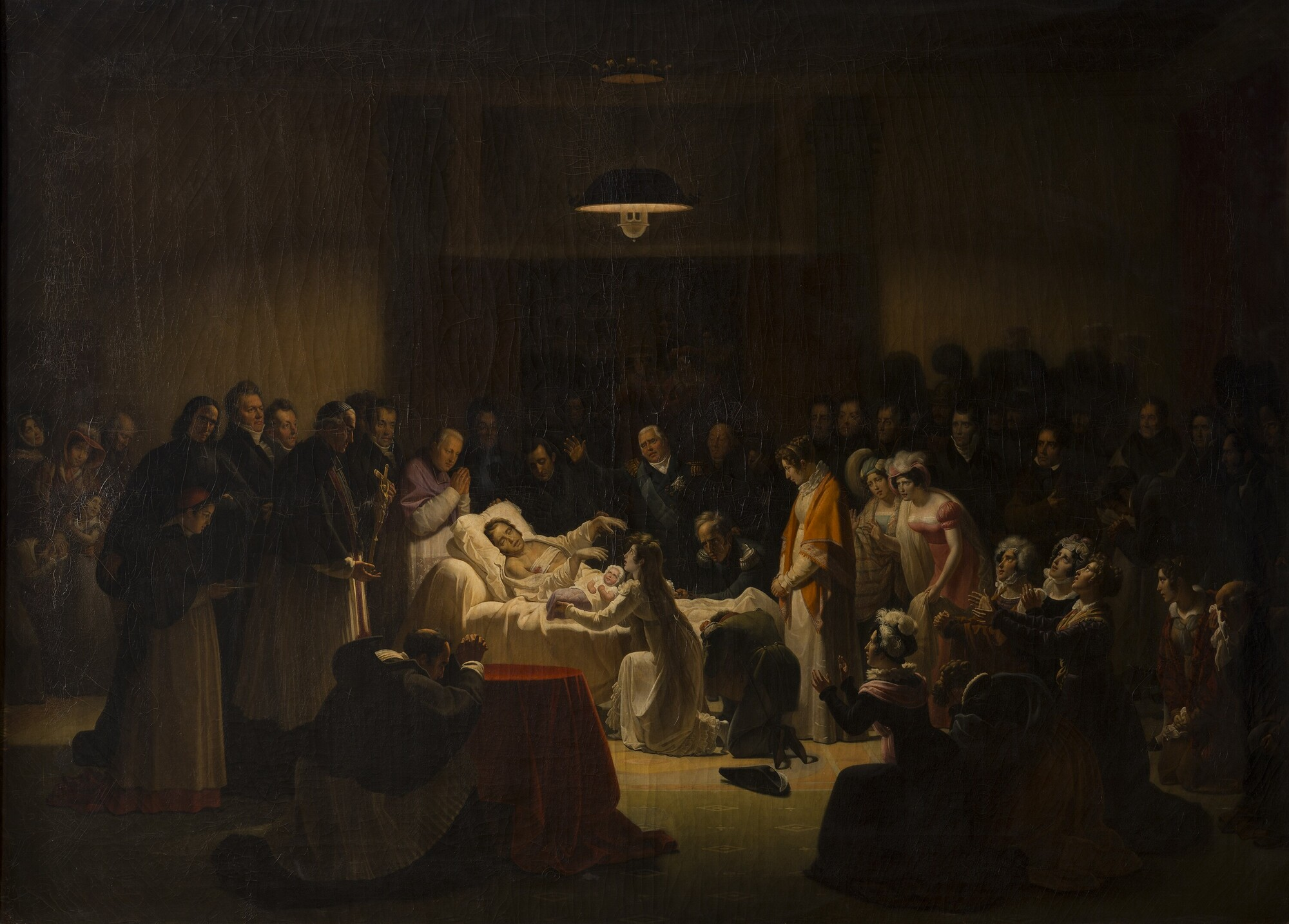
The Death of the Duke of Berry by Alexandre Menjaud

The Assassination of the Duke of Berry took place on 13 February 1820 in Paris when Charles Ferdinand, Duke of Berry was fatally wounded. Berry was the nephew of the reigning French monarch Louis XVIII and the younger son of the future king Charles X.

The killing of the Duke had significant impact on French politics of the Restoration era, boosting the position of the Ultra-Royalist movement. After his death his pregnant wife Marie-Caroline gave birth to a son Henri, securing the future succession of the French dynasty.

== Background ==
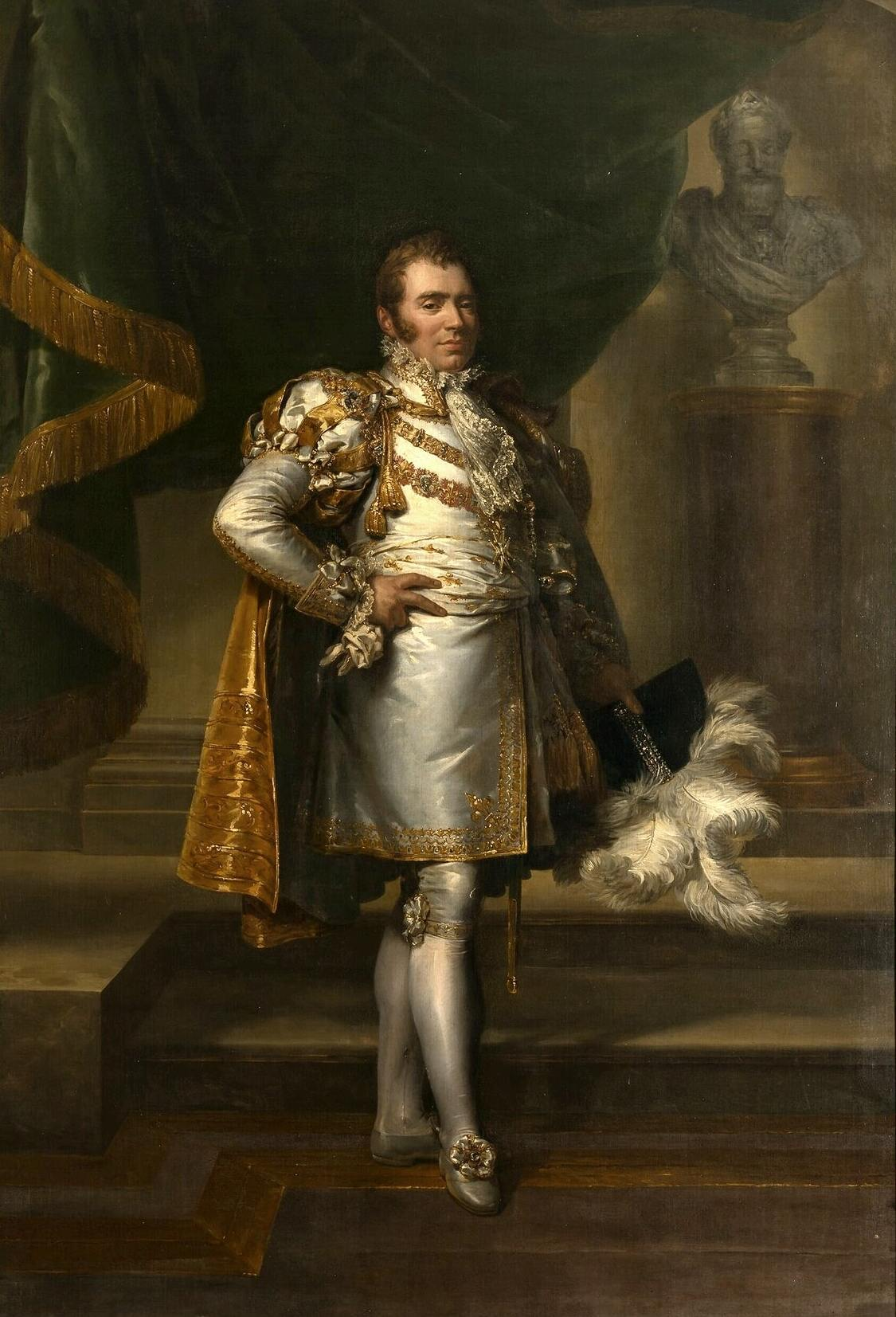
Portrait of the Duke of Berry by François Gérard, 1820

Following the defeat of Napoleon at the Battle of Waterloo during the Hundred Days campaign in 1815 the Second Bourbon Restoration saw Louis XVIII return to the throne. An Allied Army under the Duke of Wellington remained on French territory to guarantee the terms of the Treaty of Paris were upheld.

The Allied Occupation of France ended in November 1818 following the Congress of Aix-la-Chapelle. The Ultra-Royalists had unsuccessfully made a last-minute attempt to persuade the Allied forces to remain to ensure stability. On 11 February 1818 a failed assassination attempt on the life of the Duke of Wellington took place in Paris when Marie André Cantillon shot at him with a pistol.

As Louis XVIII was widowed and childless it was clear that his younger brother the Count of Artois would inherit the throne. In turn, the Count's two sons — the Duke of Angoulême and the Duke of Berry — were prospective heirs to the throne. Angoulême had no children, but his younger brother Berry had married in 1816 and already had a daughter, Louise.

== Assassination ==
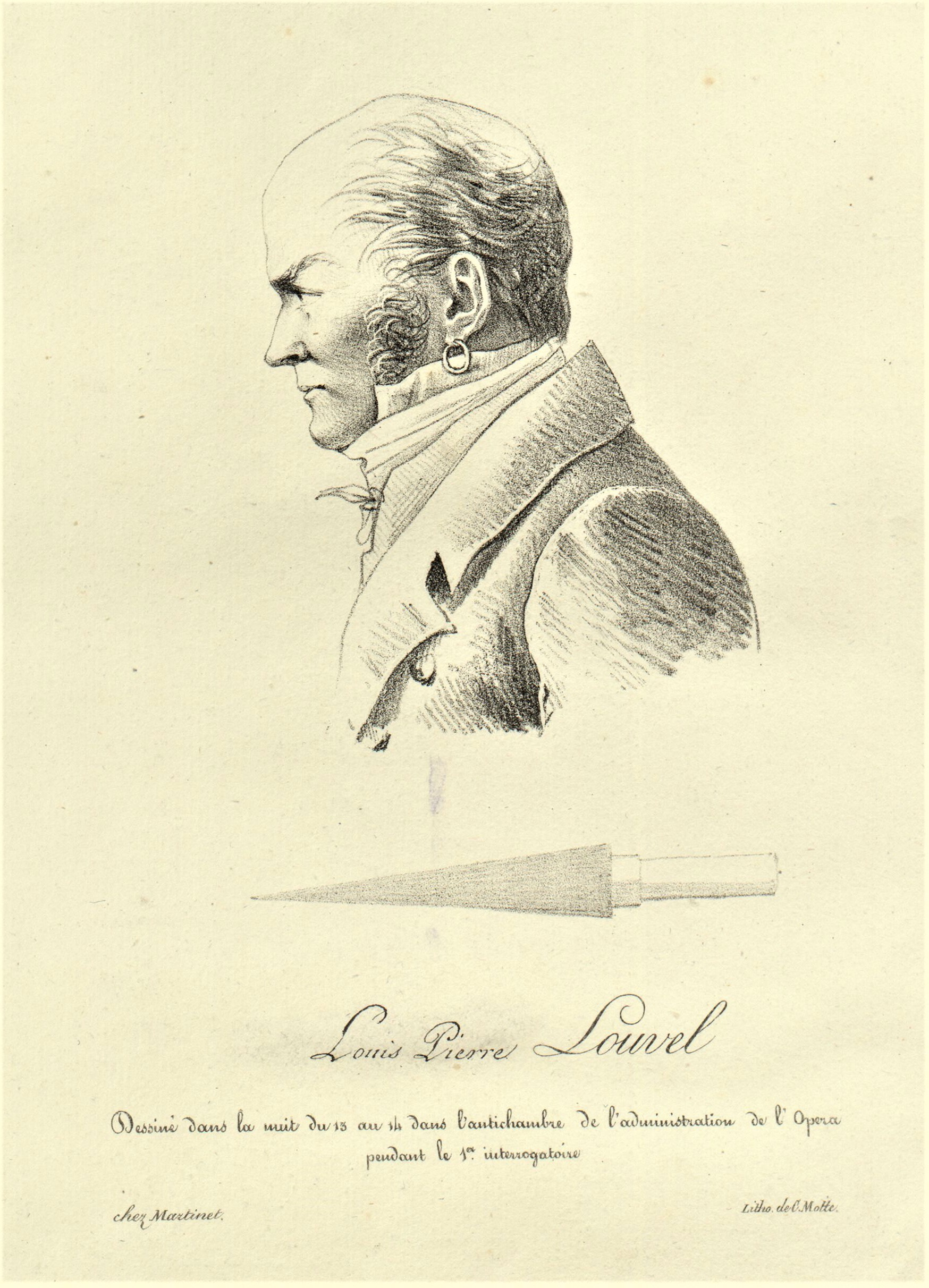
Lithograph of Berry's assassin Louis Pierre Louvel

On the evening of 13 February 1820, the Duke of Berry and his wife attended the Paris Opera at the Théâtre National, which featured a programme including Le Rossignol by Louis-Sébastien Lebrun and some ballets.

During the intermission the duchess, who had felt unwell, decided to leave. Her husband escorted her out to their carriage in the Rue Rameau. He was planning to return to the theatre, as the singer Virginie Oreille — his long-standing mistress — was performing that night and he wished to see her afterwards.

In the street he was attacked by Louis Pierre Louvel, who — evading a sentry and others who tried to intervene — stabbed Berry in the chest with a seven-inch dagger. The depth of the wound convinced Berry at once that it was a fatal one. In the confused moments after his attack he managed to get away but was soon captured in the nearby Arcade Colbet.

Berry was taken to the manager's office and laid out on the floor. His wife, who had knelt over his fallen body, was covered in his blood and extremely distressed. As news of the attack spread, the royal family and leading politicians hurried there to gather round the clearly dying Duke. Louis XVIII arrived around 5am in the morning. Berry pleaded with his uncle to spare the life of his assassin. Louis gave a noncommittal response and insisted that Berry would recover from his wound.

== Aftermath ==
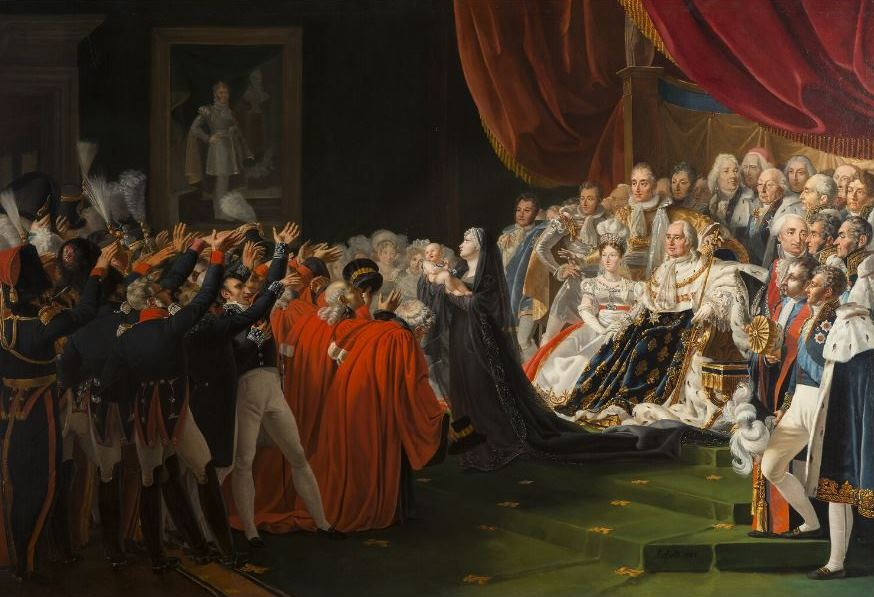
The Duchess of Berry Presenting the Duke of Bordeaux by Charles-Nicolas Lafond, 1821

From 17 to 22 February Berry's body lay in state at the Tuileries Palace, with many coming to pay their respects. The burial took place at the cathedral of Saint-Denis in Paris on 14 March.

The assassin Louvel was arrested and committed for trial. A saddler by trade, he had formerly served in the French Imperial Army. Louvel was a committed Bonapartist who believed that by wiping out the royal family he could secure the return of Napoleon, then still in exile on Saint Helena in the custody of the British Army. He was found guilty and guillotined on 7 June 1820.

The political fallout of the murder sharply altered French politics under the Constitutional Monarchy of the Bourbons. It led to the dismissal of the reformist Prime Minister the Duke of Decazes and his replacement by the conservative Duke of Richelieu. Although a moderate, Richelieu, who had previously served as Chief Minister between 1815 to 1818, was now beholden to the Ultra-Royalists. In December 1821 Richelieu was succeeded by the staunch Ultra-Royalist Joseph de Villèle, who held office until 1828. Ultras such as Chateaubriand and Charles Nodier attributed blame for the murder to the liberalism of Decazes.

Louis ordered the site of the assassination, the Théâtre National, to be closed and demolished. The Paris Opera was relocated to the Salle Le Peletier.

As the weeks passed following Berry's death, it became clear that his wife had fallen pregnant not long before the Duke's assassination. She gave birth to a boy, the Duke of Bordeaux, on 29 September 1820. The birth of this posthumous son to Berry was hailed by French Royalists as it appeared to assure the succession of the House of Bourbon for a further generation. However, the July Revolution of 1830 drove the dynasty into exile. From 1844 Bordeaux headed the Legitimist movement in exile.

A number of artworks commemorated the assassination and its aftermath. Most notable of these was The Death of the Duke of Berry by Alexandre Menjaud, which was exhibited at the Salon of 1824. The earlier Salon of 1822 had featured The Duchess of Berry Presenting the Duke of Bordeaux which celebrated the birth of an heir. Victor Hugo, then an Ultra-Royalist young writer produced odes commemorating both events. Louis XVIII was reportedly moved to tears by the poetic tribute to his nephew and rewarded Hugo

== See also ==
- Carlsbad Decrees, measures adopted in the German Confederation following the 1819 assassination of August von Kotzebue
- Cato Street Conspiracy, an 1820 plot by revolutionaries to assassinate the British cabinet of Lord Liverpool

== Bibliography ==
- Boucher, Jean-Jacques. Charles Ferdinand d'Artois, duc de Berry, 1778-1820. Lanore, 2000.
- Everist, Mark. Music Drama at the Paris Odéon, 1824-1828. University of California Press, 2002.
- Muir, Rory. Wellington: Waterloo and the Fortunes of Peace 1814–1852. Yale University Press, 2015.
- Price, Munro. The Perilous Crown: France Between Revolutions, 1814-1848. Pan Macmillan, 2010.
- Robb, Graham. Victor Hugo: A Biography. Picador, 1998.
- Skuy, David. Assassination, Politics and Miracles: France and the Royalist Reaction of 1820. McGill-Queen's University Press, 2003.
- Stewart, John Hall. The Restoration Era in France, 1814-1830. Van Nostrand, 1968.
