= Portrait of the Duchess of Berry (Vigée Le Brun) =

Painting by Élisabeth Vigée Le Brun

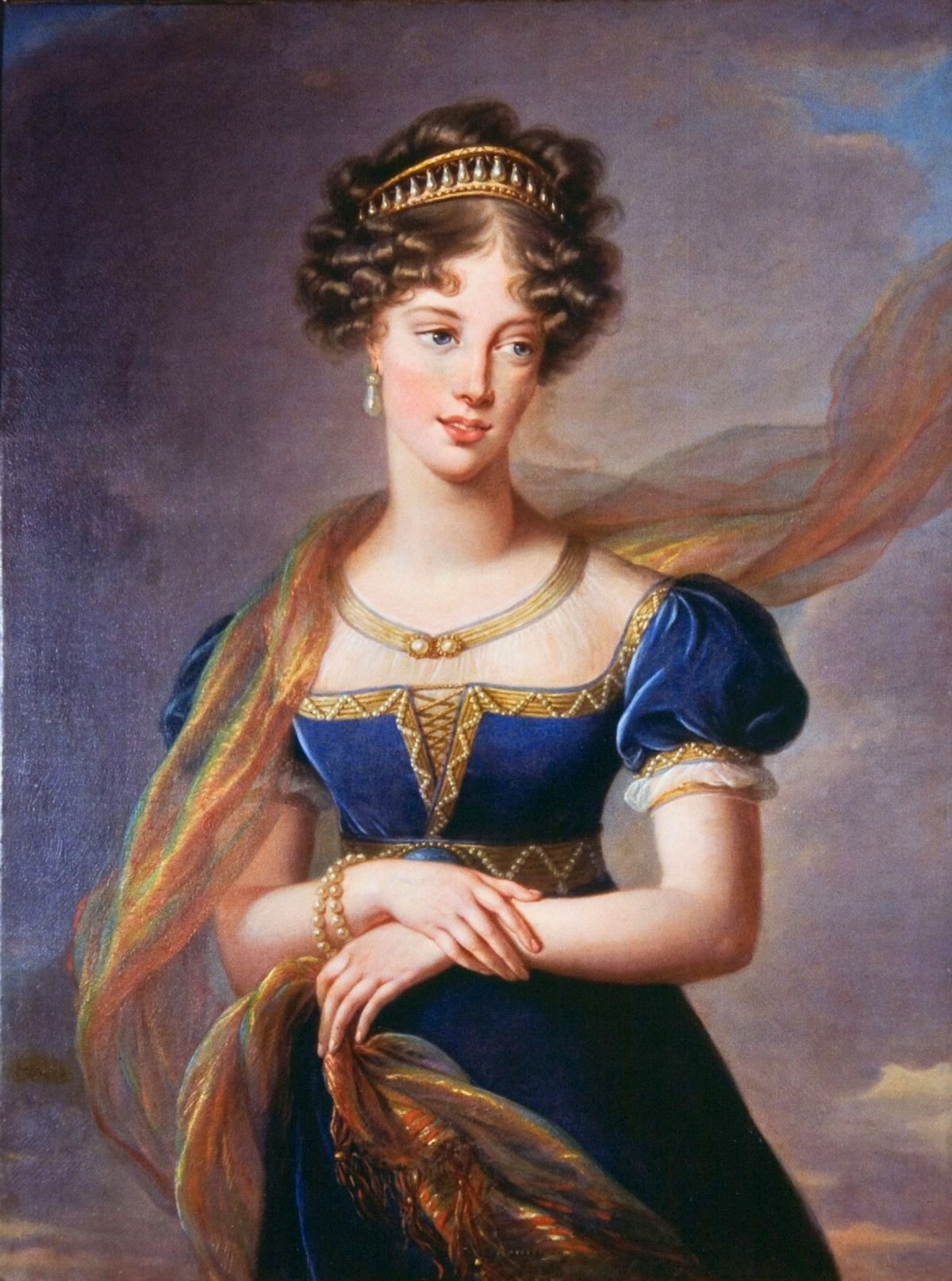
- Artist: Élisabeth Vigée Le Brun
- Year: 1824
- Type: Oil on canvas, portrait painting
- Dimensions: 100 cm × 75 cm (39 in × 30 in)
- Location: Private Collection

Portrait of the Duchess of Berry is an 1824 portrait painting by the French artist Élisabeth Vigée Le Brun depicting the Italian Marie-Caroline, Duchess of Berry, a member of the reigning Bourbon Dynasty of France. Le Brun had been a leading painter of Ancien Regime France, associated with Marie Antoinette. Following the French Revolution she spent many years in exile before returning. The painting was commissioned by the French crown, one of a major works featuring the Duchess during the period. She is depicted in a blue velvet dress against a stormy background.

Marie-Caroline married the Duke of Berry in 1816. After the assassination of her husband at the Paris Opera in February 1820, the Duchess gave birth to a posthumous son - the apparent future heir Henry, Duke of Bordeaux. In the 1820s she was a prominent figure at that French court and a noted art collector. The July Revolution of 1830 overthrew her father-in-law Charles X of France and the family went into exile. In 1832 she led a failed uprising in the Vendée in support of her son.

It was exhibited at Salon of 1824 at the Louvre in Paris. both this and another work were overshadowed by the emergence of Romanticism at the Salon.

Today the painting is in a private collection, but featured in an exhibition at the Metropolitan Museum of Art in 2016.

== See also ==
- Portrait of the Duchess of Berry, an 1825 portrait by Thomas Lawrence

== Bibliography ==
- Baillio, Joseph & Baetjer, Katharine & Lang, Paul. Vigée Le Brun. Metropolitan Museum of Art, 2016.
- Price, Munro. The Perilous Crown: France Between Revolutions, 1814-1848. Pan Macmillan, 2010.
