= Charles Ferdinand =

Charles Ferdinand may refer to:

- Charles Ferdinand, Duke of Berry (1778–1820)
- Charles William Ferdinand, Duke of Brunswick (1735–1806)

== See also ==
- Ferdinand Charles (disambiguation)
