= The Death of the Duke of Berry =

Painting by Alexandre Menjaud

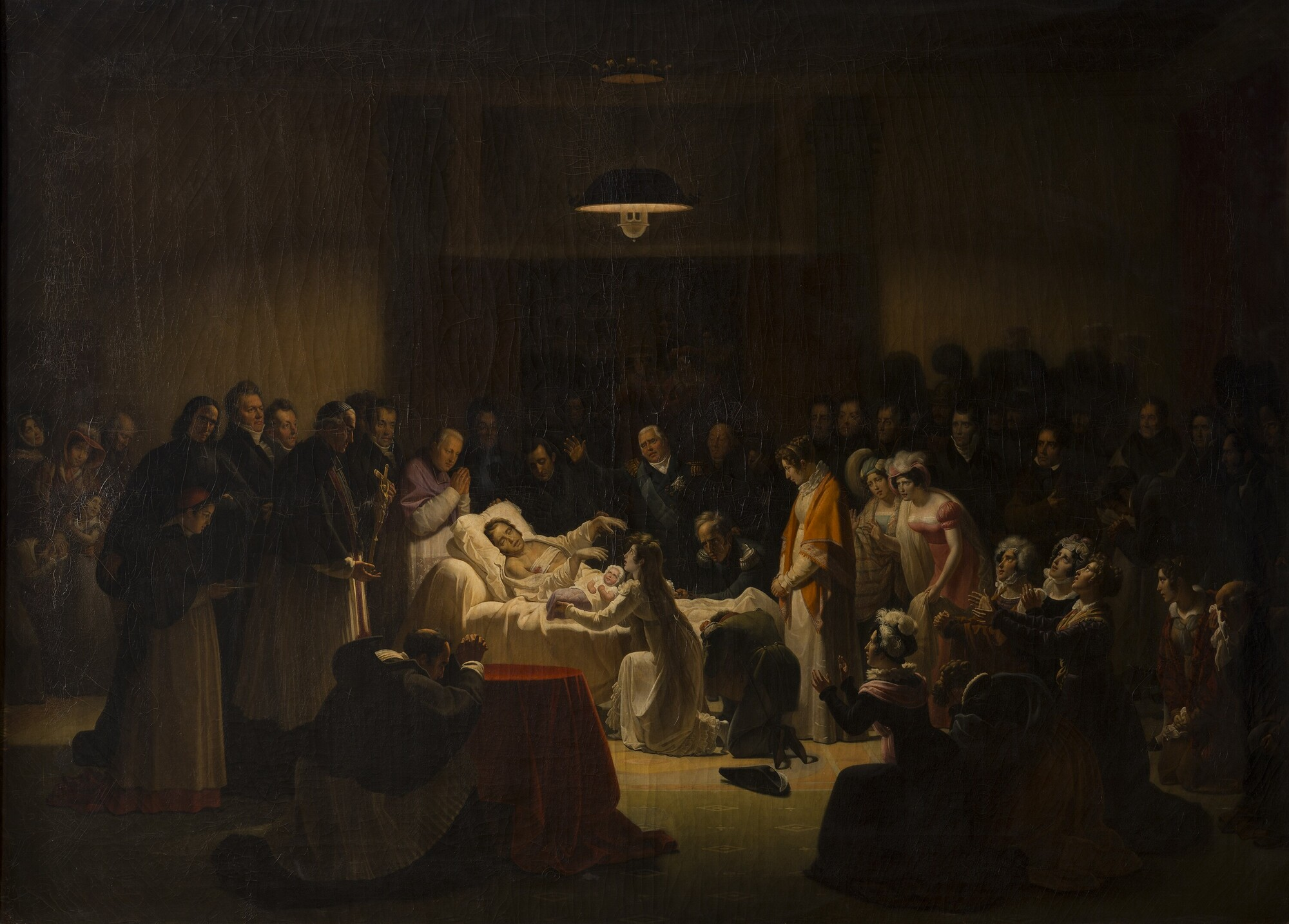
- Artist: Alexandre Menjaud
- Year: 1824
- Type: Oil on canvas, history painting
- Dimensions: 131 cm × 169.5 cm (52 in × 66.7 in)
- Location: Palace of Versailles, Versailles

The Death of the Duke of Berry (French: Mort du duc de Berry) is an 1824 history painting by the French painter Alexandre Menjaud. It depicts the final moments of Charles Ferdinand, Duke of Berry on 13 February 1820 after he was mortally wounded by an assassin at the Théâtre National. Berry was the nephew of the French king Louis XVIII and a prominent figure of the Restoration era. It is also known as Les Derniers moments du duc de Berry.

Shortly after attending the Paris Opera the Duke was stabbed by the Bonapartist Louis Pierre Louvel. It took several hours for him to die and he was treated by the surgeon Charles Bougon. The scene produced by Menjaud is in the style of heroic death scenes popular in Neoclassical art. Notably Berry had pleaded with his uncle to spare the life of his assassin, although he was ultimately guillotined for his crime. The reaction to the assassination led to the ascendency of the Ultra-royalist movement. Unknown at the time, Berry's wife Marie Caroline was pregnant with a son Henri whose birth in September 1820 seemed to secure the future of the Bourbon dynasty.

The painting features notable figures of the Restoration era who crowd around the wounded Duke including his uncle, King Louis XVIII, his father the Count of Artois, his elder brother Duke of Angoulême and his wife Marie Caroline who holds up their young daughter Princess Louise. In the wider group gathered are the Prince of Condé, the Duke of Orléans, the Duchess of Orléans, Adelaide of Orléans, the current and future Prime Ministers Decazes and Richelieu and the politician and writer François-René de Chateaubriand. The work was commissioned by the French state for six thousand francs to be hung in the Musée du Luxembourg. The painting was exhibited at the Salon of 1824 at the Louvre. Today it is in the collection of the Palace of Versailles.

== See also ==
- Portrait of the Duke of Berry, an 1820 painting by François Gérard

== Bibliography ==
- Allard, Sébastien. Paris 1820: l'affirmation de la génération romantique : actes de la journée d'étude organisée par le Centre André Chastel le 24 mai 2004. Peter Lang, 2005.
- Price, Munro. The Perilous Crown: France Between Revolutions, 1814-1848. Pan Macmillan, 2010.
