= Portrait of the Duchess of Berry =

1825 painting by Thomas Lawrence

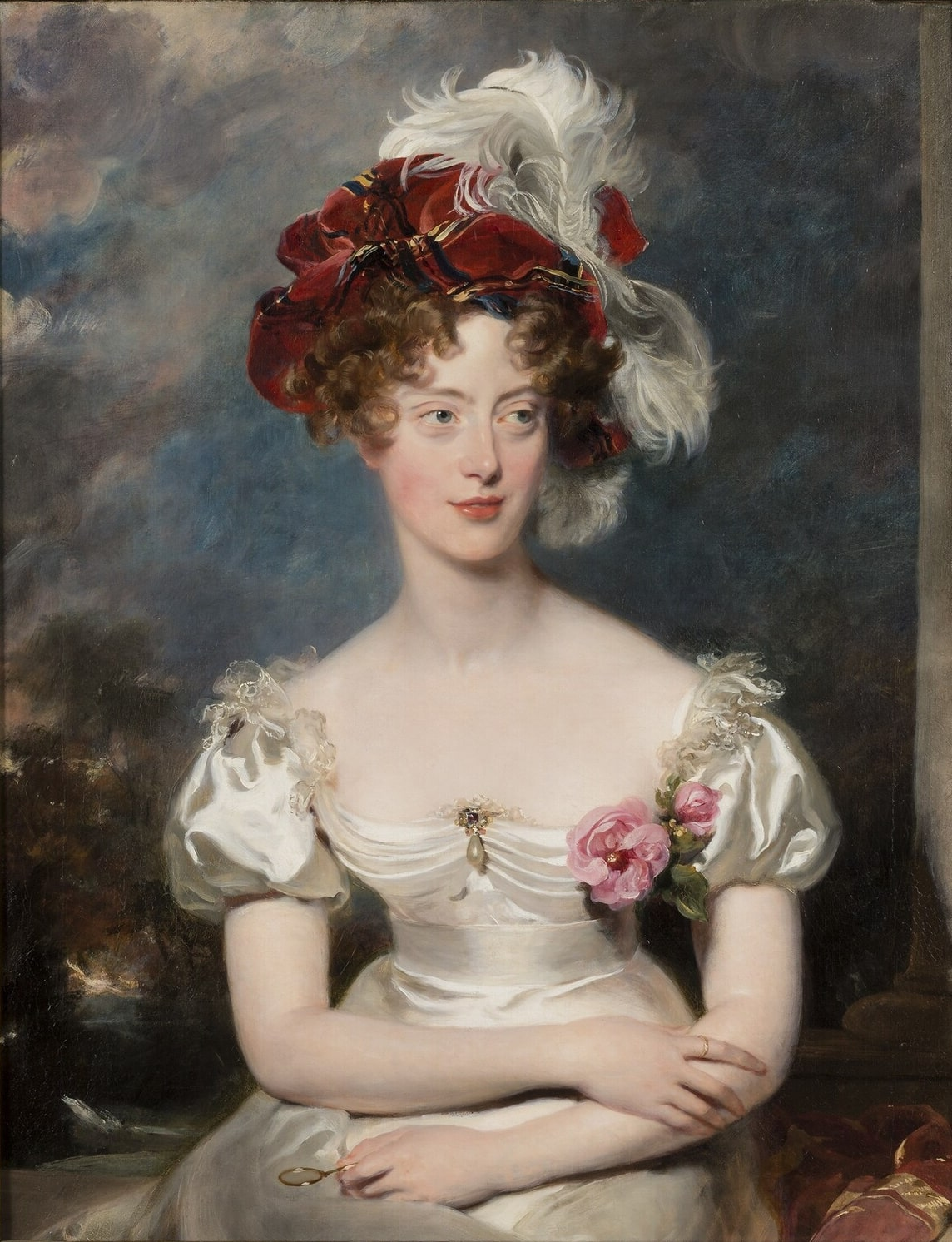
- Artist: Thomas Lawrence
- Year: 1825
- Type: Oil on canvas, portrait
- Dimensions: 91 cm × 71 cm (36 in × 28 in)
- Location: Palace of Versailles, Paris

Portrait of the Duchess of Berry is an oil on canvas portrait painting by the English artist Sir Thomas Lawrence, from 1825.

== History and description ==
It depicts the Italian-born French royal Marie-Caroline, Duchess of Berry, the widowed daughter-in-law of the reigning French monarch Charles X. A few months after the assassination of her husband the Duke of Berry in 1820, she gave birth to a child Henri who seemed to secure the succession for the House of Bourbon.

Lawrence was President of the Royal Academy in London and Britain's most fashionable portrait painter. He was commissioned by George IV to travel to France to paint Charles X the year of his Coronation in Rheims. While in the country he also painted the king's eldest son Louis Antoine, Duke of Angoulême. Impressed by the depictions of her father and brother-in-law, Berry secured his services for a portrait. He depicts her as a lady of fashion, holding a quizzing glass. After the July Revolution that sent the Bourbons into exile, the Duchess launched an unsuccessful landing in 1832 in an attempt to place her son on the throne.

Today the painting is in the collection of the Palace of Versailles.

== See also ==
- Portrait of the Duke of Berry, 1820 painting of her husband by François Gérard
- Portrait of the Duchess of Berry, an 1824 painting by Élisabeth Vigée Le Brun

== Bibliography ==
- Diederen, Roger. European Paintings of the 19th Century: Aligny-Gros. ISBN 9407175227. Cleveland Museum of Art, 1999.
- Levey, Michael. Sir Thomas Lawrence. ISBN 0300109989. Yale University Press, 2005.
- Noon, Patrick & Bann, Stephen. Constable to Delacroix: British Art and the French Romantics. ISBN 1854374591. Tate, 2003.
- Samuels, Maurice. The Betrayal of the Duchess: The Scandal That Unmade the Bourbon Monarchy and Made France Modern. ISBN 1541645456. Basic Books, 2020.
