= Henri, Count of Chambord =

Pretender to the French throne as Henry V (1844–83)

Henry V
- King of France; Count of Chambord; Duke of Bordeaux
- Photograph c. 1870

King of France (disputed) as Henry V
- Tenure: 2 August 1830 – 9 August 1830
- Predecessor: Charles X Louis XIX (not proclaimed)
- Successor: Louis Philippe I as King of the French

Legitimist pretender to the French throne
- Pretence: 3 June 1844 – 24 August 1883
- Predecessor: Louis Antoine, Duke of Angoulême
- Successor: Philippe, Count of Paris or Prince Juan, Count of Montizón
- Born: 29 September 1820; Tuileries Palace, Paris, France
- Died: 24 August 1883 (aged 62); Schloss Frohsdorf, Frohsdorf, Austria-Hungary
- Burial: Kostanjevica Monastery
- Spouse: Archduchess Maria Theresa of Austria-Este (m. 1846)
Names
- Henri Charles Ferdinand Marie Dieudonné d'Artois
- House: Bourbon
- Father: Prince Charles Ferdinand, Duke of Berry
- Mother: Princess Maria Carolina of Naples and Sicily

Henri, Count of Chambord and Duke of Bordeaux (French: Henri Charles Ferdinand Marie Dieudonné d'Artois, duc de Bordeaux, comte de Chambord; 29 September 1820 – 24 August 1883), was the Legitimist pretender to the throne of France as Henri V from 1844 until his death in 1883.

Henri was the only son of Charles Ferdinand, Duke of Berry, born after his father's death, by his wife, Princess Carolina of Naples and Sicily, daughter of King Francis I of the Two Sicilies. The Duke himself was the younger son of Charles X. As the grandson of Charles X, Henri was a Petit-Fils de France. He was the last-surviving legitimate descendant of Louis XV in the male line. He also was titular King of France as Henry V during the July Revolution, when his grandfather, Charles X and uncle, Louis XIX both abdicated in his favor, though he was never officially proclaimed by the Chamber of Deputies, which instead chose Louis Philippe I of the House of Orléans.

== Early life ==
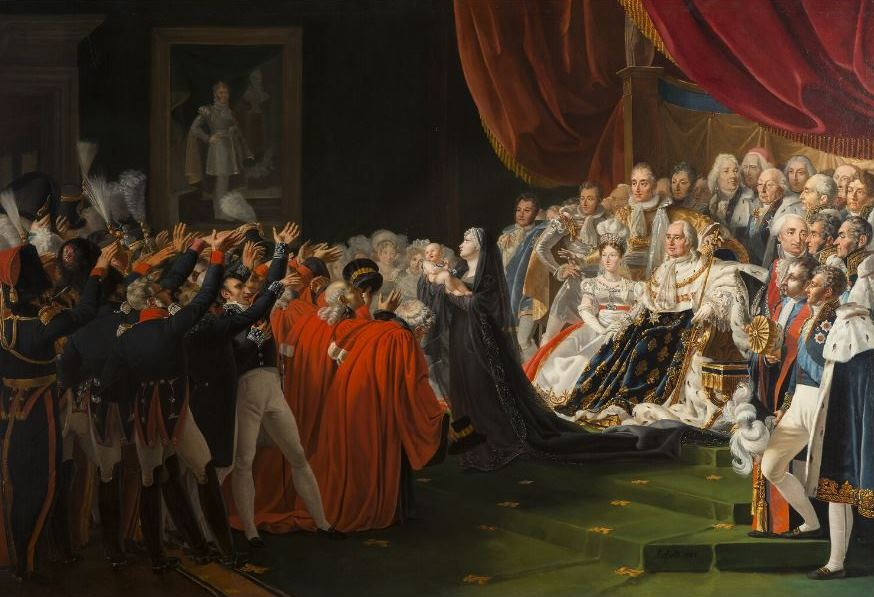
The Duchess of Berry Presenting the Duke of Bordeaux by Charles Nicolas Lafond, 1821

Henri d'Artois was born on 29 September 1820, in the Pavillon de Marsan, a portion of the Tuileries Palace that still survives in the compound of the Louvre Palace in Paris. His father, the Duke of Berry, had been assassinated seven months before Henri's birth.

At birth, Henri was given the title of duc de Bordeaux. Because of his birth after his father's death, when the senior male line of the House of Bourbon was on the verge of extinction, one of his middle names was Dieudonné (French for "God-given"). Royalists called him "the miracle child". Louis XVIII was overjoyed, bestowing 35 royal orders to mark the occasion. Henri's birth was a major setback for the Duke of Orleans' ambitions to ascend the French throne. During his customary visit to congratulate the newborn's mother, the duke made such offensive remarks about the baby's appearance that the lady holding him was brought to tears.

== Titular King ==
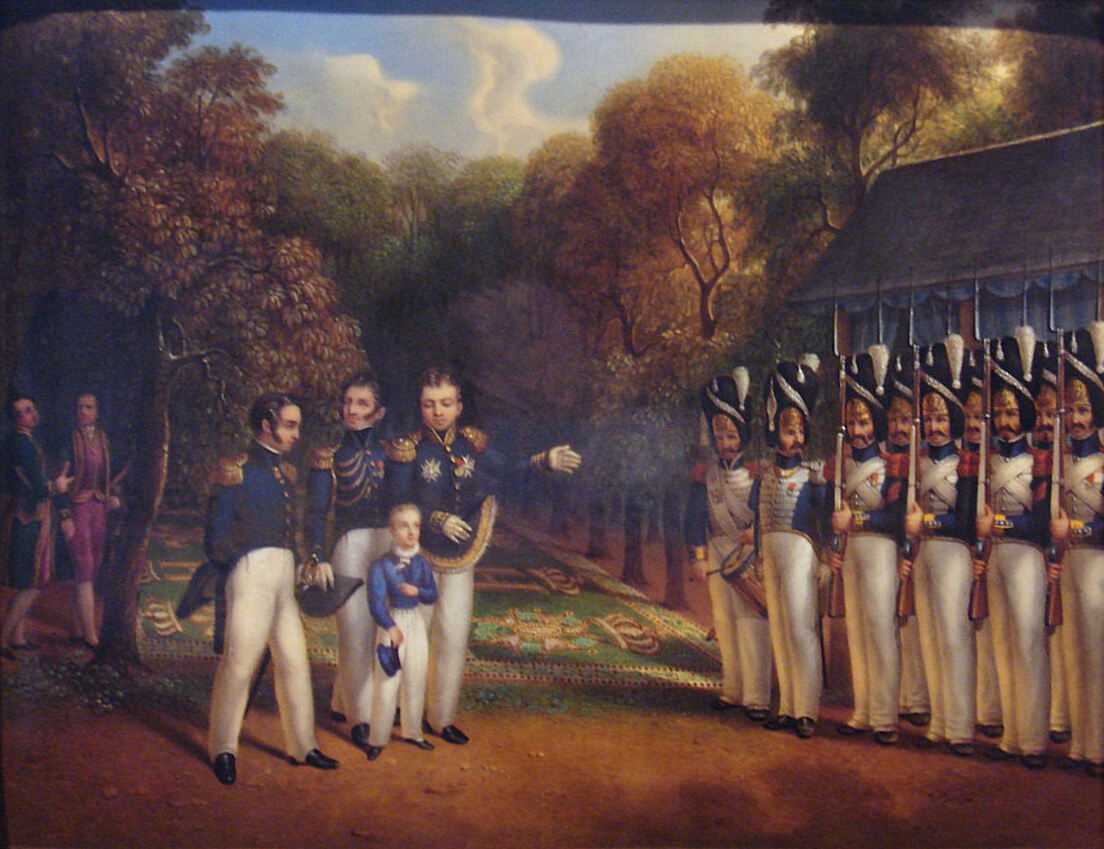
The young Prince Henri inspecting the Royal Guard at Rambouillet on 2 August 1830.

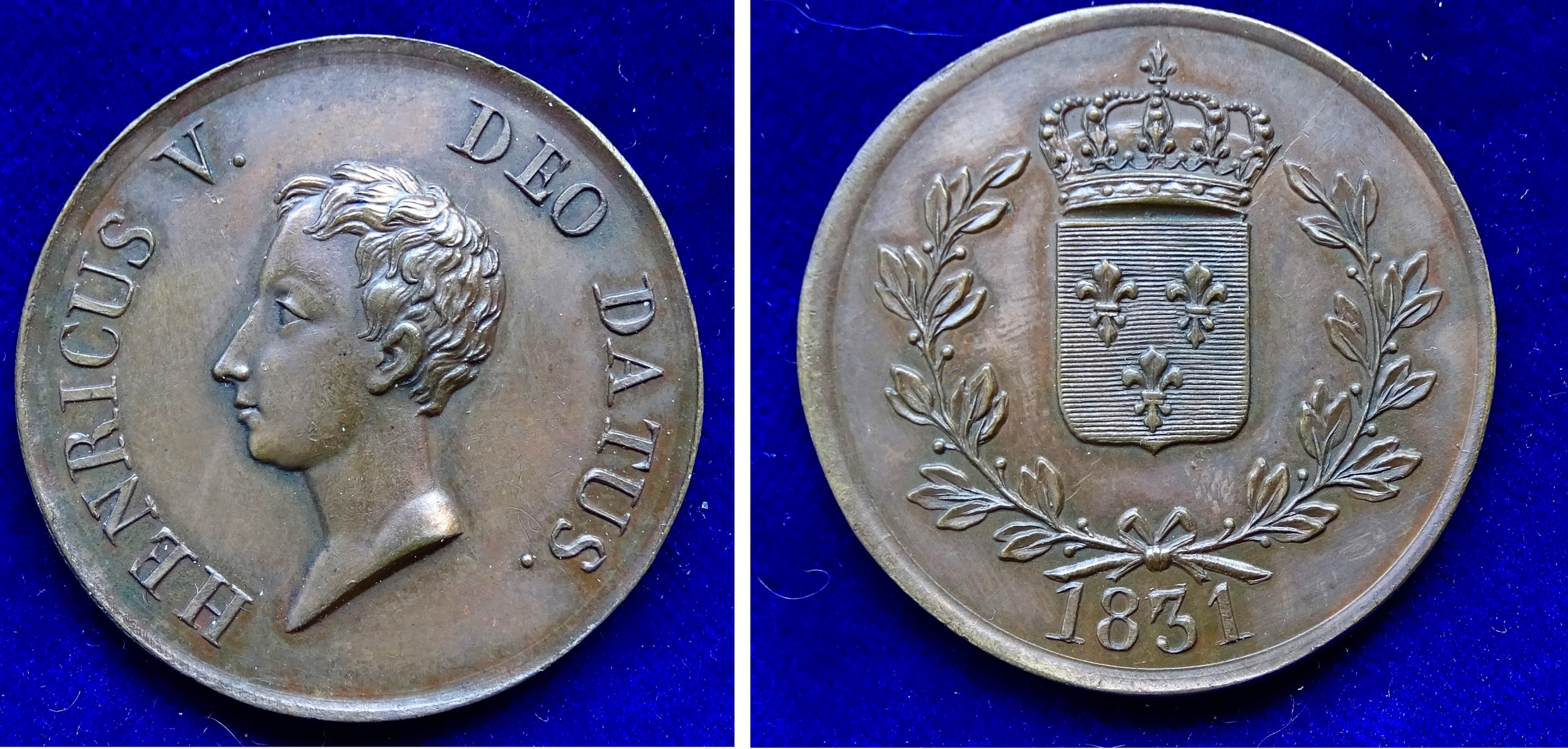
France Pretender Bronze Coin 5 Fr 1831 Henri V, Count of Chambord, 1820 Paris – 1883 Frohsdorf, Austria. Juvenile head l./ Crowned royal arms of France.

On 2 August 1830, in response to the July Revolution, Henri's grandfather, Charles X, abdicated, and twenty minutes later Charles' elder son Louis Antoine, Duke of Angoulême, himself renounced his rights, in favour of the young Duke of Bordeaux. Charles X urged his cousin Louis Philippe of Orléans, as Lieutenant général du royaume, to proclaim Henri as Henry V, King of France. Louis Philippe requested the Duke of Bordeaux to be brought to Paris to have his rights recognised. The duchess of Berry was forbidden to escort her son; therefore, both the grandfather and the mother refused to leave the child in France. As a consequence, after seven days, a period in which legitimist monarchists considered that Henri had been the rightful monarch of France, the Chamber of Deputies decreed that the throne should pass to Louis Philippe, who was proclaimed King of the French on 9 August.

Henri and his family left France and went into exile on 16 August 1830. While some French monarchists recognised him as their sovereign, others disputed the validity of the abdications of his grandfather and of his uncle. Still others recognised the July Monarchy of Louis Philippe. With the deaths of his 79-year-old grandfather in 1836 and of his uncle in 1844, young Henri became the genealogically senior claimant to the French throne. His supporters were called Legitimists, to distinguish them from the Orléanists, the supporters of the family of Louis Philippe.

Henri, who preferred the courtesy title of Count of Chambord (from the château de Chambord, which had been presented to him by the Restoration government, and which was the only significant piece of personal property of which he was allowed to retain ownership upon his exile), continued his claim to the throne throughout the July Monarchy of Louis Philippe, the Second Republic and Empire of Napoléon III, and the early years of the Third Republic.

In November 1846, the Count of Chambord married his second cousin Archduchess Maria Theresa of Austria-Este, daughter of Duke Francis IV of Modena and Princess Maria Beatrice of Savoy. The couple had no children.

== Attempted restoration ==
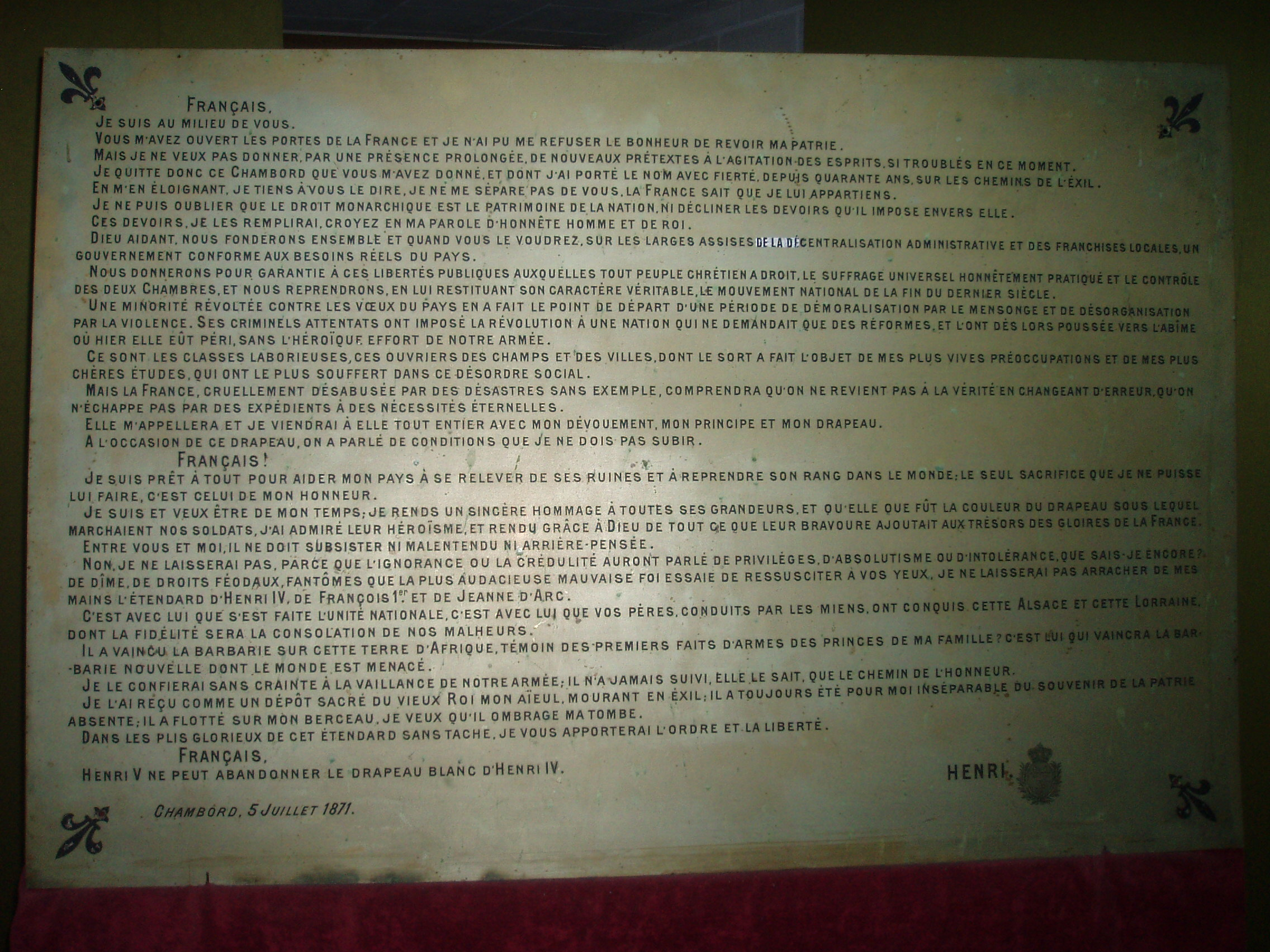
Plaque, at the château de Chambord, of the 5 July 1871 declaration, known as the "declaration of the white flag" (déclaration du drapeau blanc), by Henri, Count of Chambord (Henri V).

The French tricolore with the royal crown and fleur-de-lys was possibly designed by the count in his younger years as a compromise

In 1870, as the Second Empire collapsed following its defeat in the Franco-Prussian War at the battle of Sedan on 2 September 1870, the royalists became a majority in the National Assembly. The Orléanists agreed to support the Count of Chambord's claim to the throne, with the expectation that upon his death, with him lacking any sons, he would be succeeded by their own claimant, Philippe d'Orléans, Count of Paris. With Henri backed by both Legitimists and Orléanists, the restoration of monarchy in France seemed a likely possibility. However, he insisted that he would accept the crown only on condition that France abandon its tricolour flag (associated with the French Revolution) and return to the use of the fleur de lys flag, comprising the historic royal arms of France. He rejected a compromise whereby the fleur-de-lys would be the new king's personal standard, and the tricolour would remain the national flag. Pope Pius IX, upon hearing Henri's decision, notably remarked "And all that, all that for a napkin!"

In 1873 another attempt to restore the monarchy failed for the same reasons. Henri traveled to Paris and tried to negotiate with the government, to no avail; and on 20 November, the National Assembly confirmed Marshal Patrice de MacMahon, duc de Magenta, as Chief of State of France for the next seven years.

== Defeat ==
The Third Republic was established (with then Chief of State, the Duke of Magenta, as President of the Republic) to wait for Henri's death and his replacement by his distant cousin, the more liberal Count of Paris, of the Orléanist branch of the House of Bourbon. Initially, the monarchist majority in Parliament believed this to be temporary, until such time as the Count of Paris could return to the throne. However, by the time this occurred in 1883, public opinion had swung behind the Republic as the form of government which, in the words of the former President Adolphe Thiers, "divides us least". Thus, Henri could mockingly be hailed by republicans such as Georges Clemenceau as "the French Washington" – the one man without whom the Republic could not have been founded.

Henri died on 24 August 1883 at his residence in Frohsdorf, Austria, at the age of 62, bringing the male line of Louis XV to an end. He was buried in the crypt of his grandfather Charles X, in the church of the Franciscan Kostanjevica Monastery in Gorizia, Austria (now Slovenia). His personal property, including the Château de Chambord, was left to his nephew Robert I, Duke of Parma, son of Henri's late sister.

Henri's death left the Legitimist line of succession distinctly confused. On the one hand, Henri himself had accepted that the head of the House of France (as distinguished from the House of Bourbon) would be the head of the Orléans line, i.e. Prince Philippe, Count of Paris. This was accepted by many Legitimists, and was the default on legal grounds; the only surviving Bourbon male line more senior was the branch of the Kings of Spain, descended from King Philip V, which had however renounced its right to inherit the throne of France as a condition of the Treaty of Utrecht. However, several of Henri's supporters, including his widow, chose to disregard his statements and the Treaty, arguing that no one had the right to deny that the senior direct male-line Bourbon was the head of the House of France and thus the legitimate King of France; the renunciation of the Spanish branch would be, under this interpretation, illegitimate and therefore void. Thus the Blancs d'Espagne, as they would come to be known, settled on Prince Juan, Count of Montizón, the former Carlist pretender to the Spanish throne, as their claimant to the French crown.

== Gallery ==
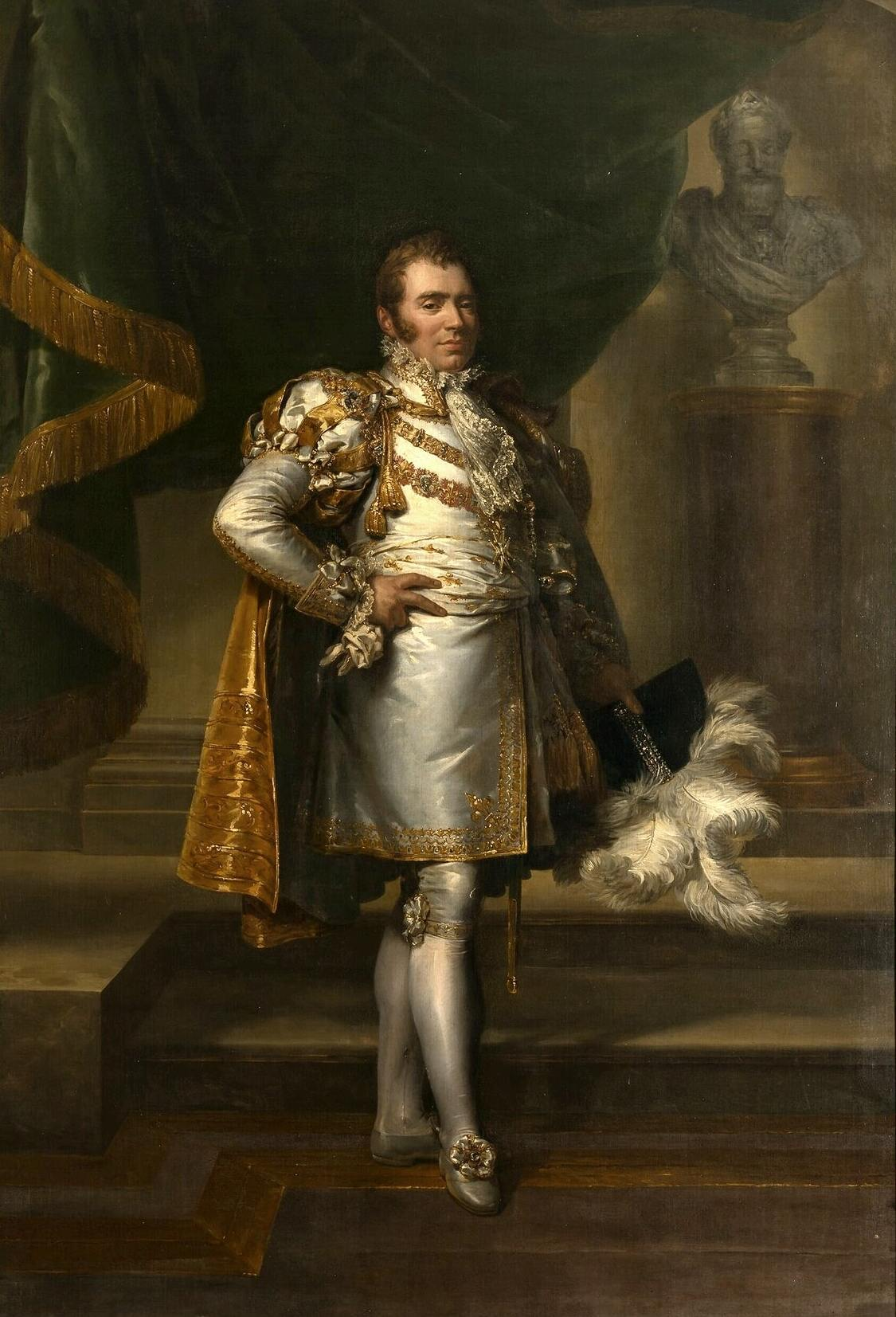
Portrait of the Duke of Berry by François Gérard, 1820

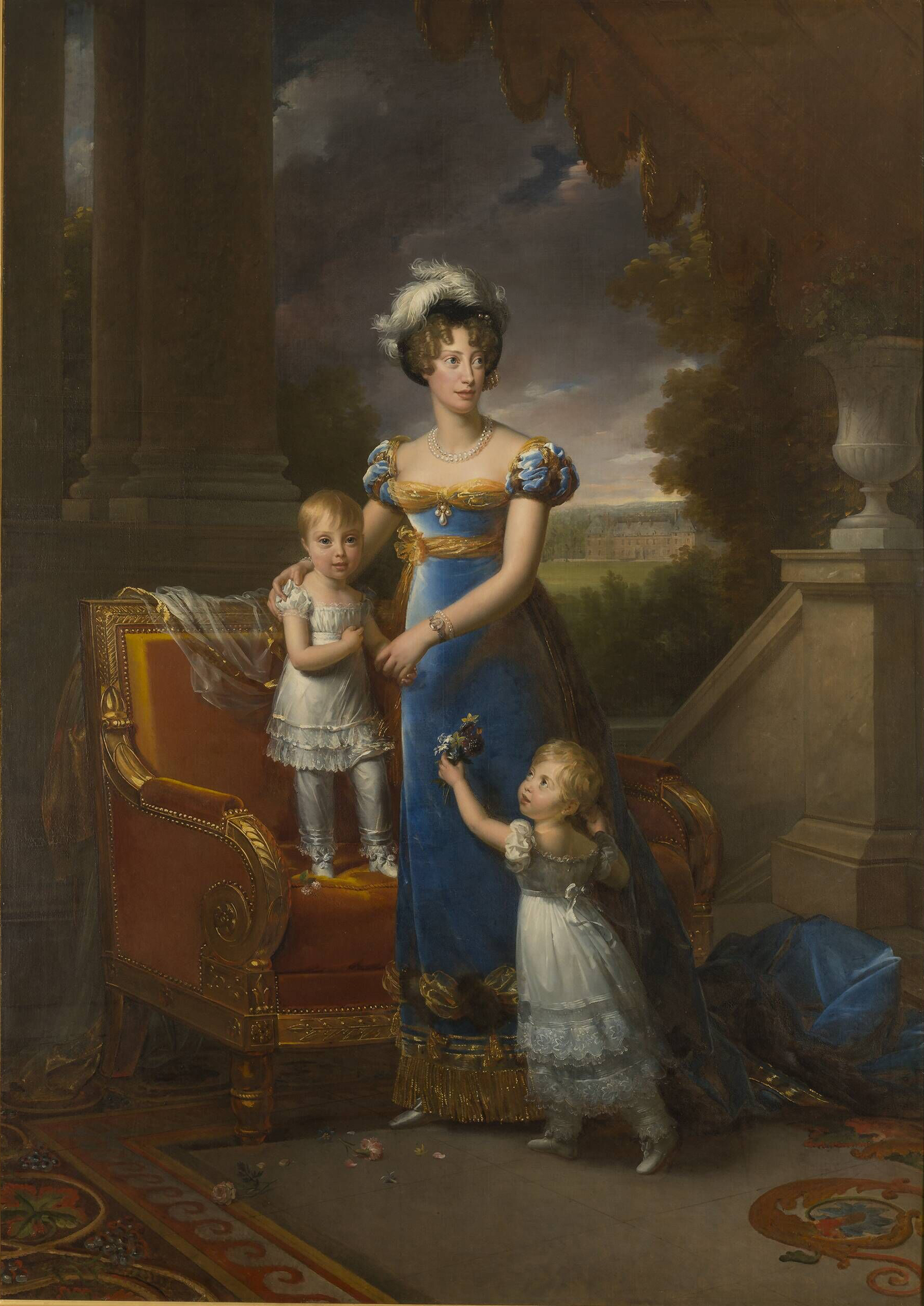
The Duchess of Berry and Her Children by François Gérard, 1822

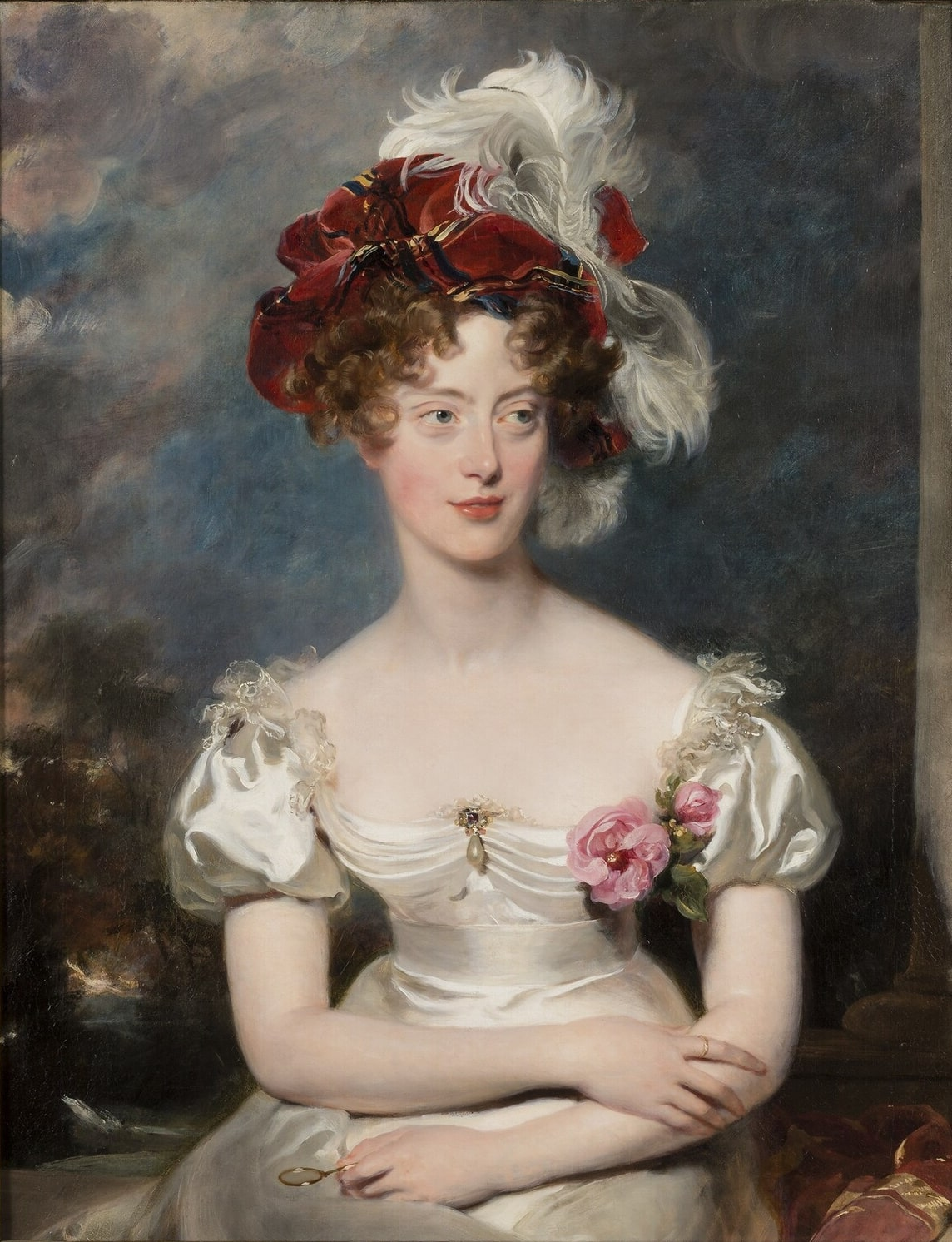
Portrait of the Duchess of Berry by Thomas Lawrence, 1825

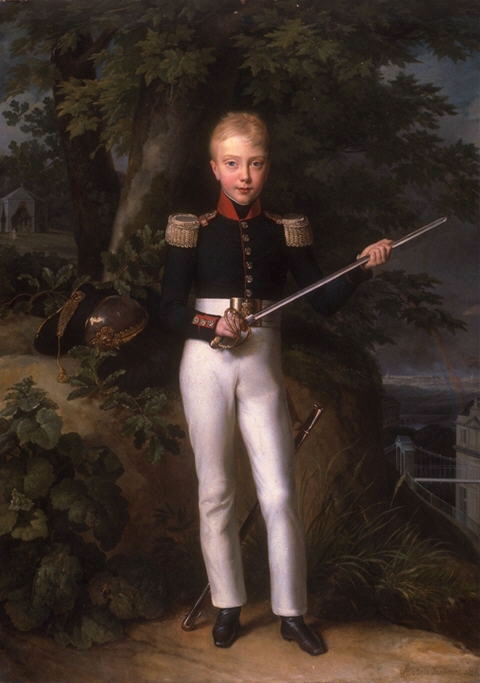
The young Duke of Bordeaux in a military uniform, by Alexandre-Jean Dubois-Drahonet, 1828

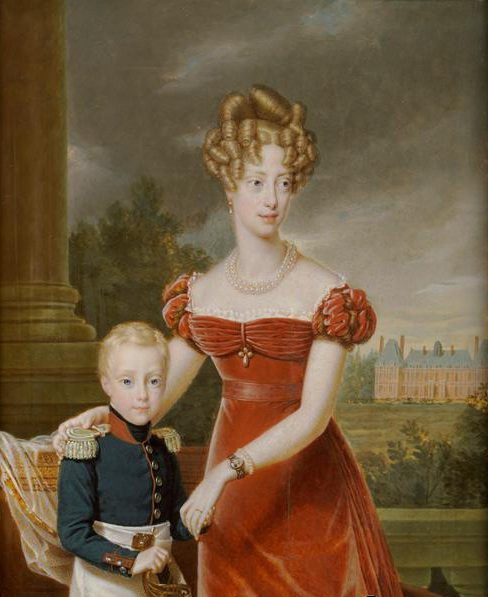
The Duchess of Berry and her son by François Gérard, 1828

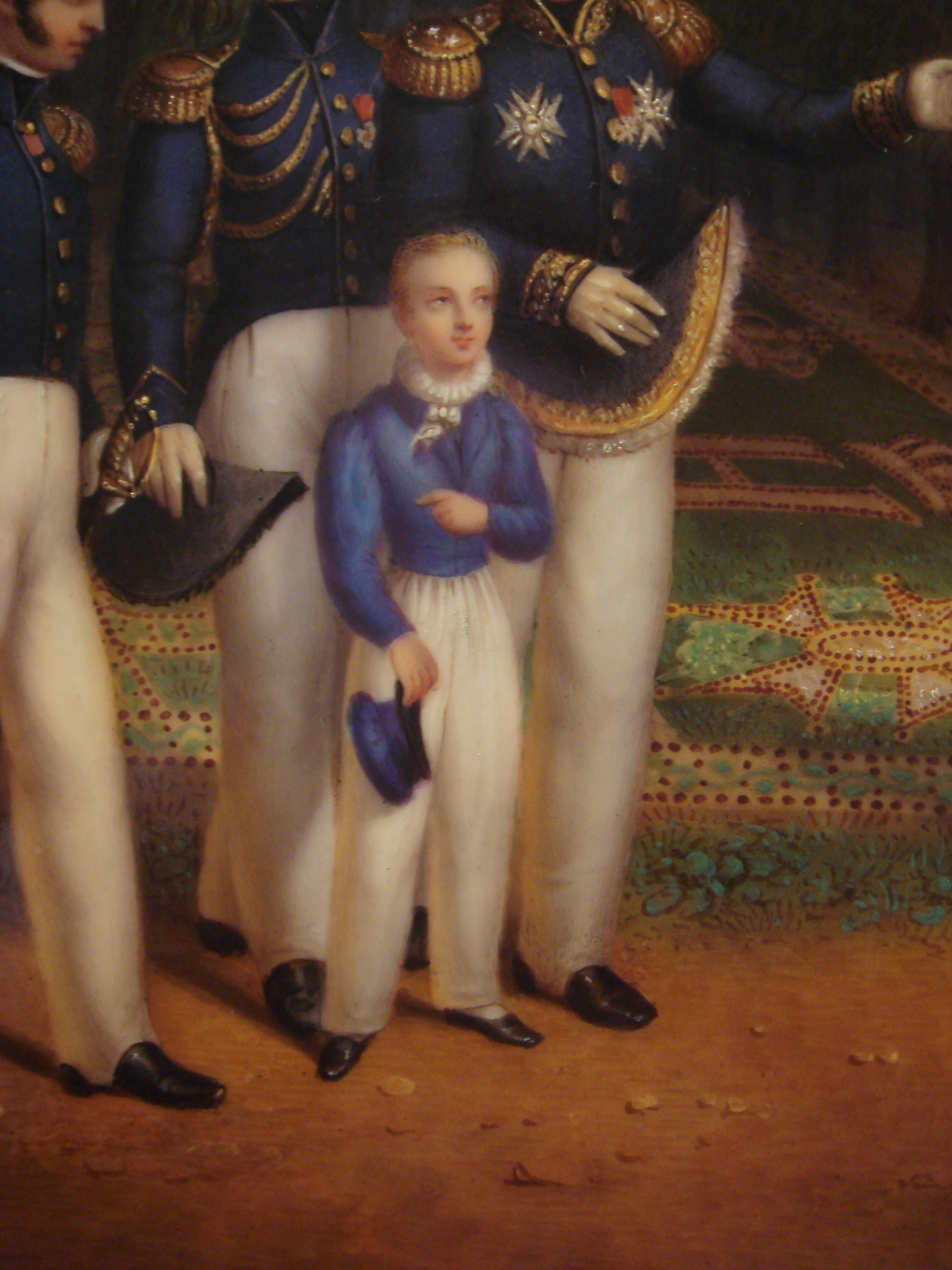
Detail of portrait, c. 1830

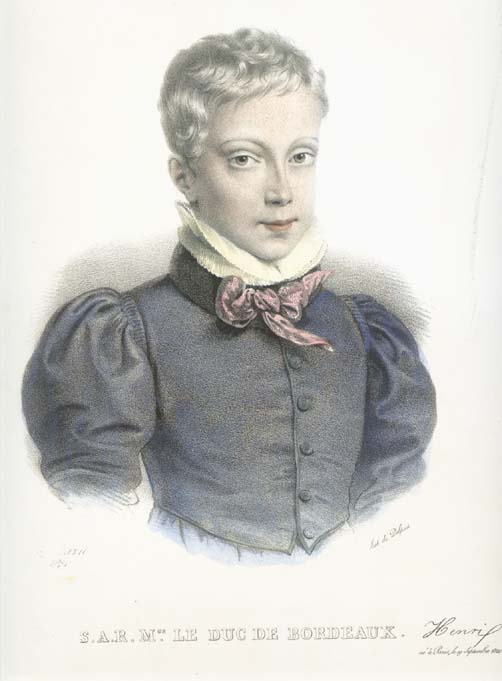
Portrait, c. 1833

== Honours ==
- House of Bourbon: Grand Master and Grand Croix of the Order of the Holy Spirit
- (Kingdom of France) House of Bourbon: Grand Master and Knight of the Royal Order of Saint Michael
- (Kingdom of France) House of Bourbon: Grand Master and Knight of the Royal and Military Order of Saint Louis
- Spain: Knight of the Order of the Golden Fleece (1823)

== Ancestry ==
Ancestors of Henri, Count of Chambord

8. Louis, Dauphin of France
4. Charles X of France
9. Maria Josepha of Saxony
2. Charles Ferdinand, Duke of Berry
10. Victor Amadeus III of Sardinia
5. Maria Theresa of Savoy
11. Maria Antonia Ferdinanda of Spain
1. Prince Henri, Count of Chambord
12. Ferdinand I of the Two Sicilies
6. Francis I of the Two Sicilies
13. Maria Carolina of Austria
3. Maria Carolina of Naples and Sicily
14. Leopold II, Holy Roman Emperor
7. Maria Clementina of Austria
15. Maria Luisa of Spain

== See also ==
- List of shortest-reigning monarchs
- Bourbon-Orléanist Restoration Project

== Footnotes ==
Henri, Count of Chambord House of Bourbon Cadet branch of the Capetian dynasty Born: 29 September 1820 Died: 24 August 1883
Regnal titles
Preceded by Louis XIX (disputed)	King of France (disputed); 2 – 9 August 1830	Succeeded by Louis Philippe I as King of the French
Titles in pretence
Preceded by Louis XIX	— TITULAR — King of France; Legitimist pretender 3 June 1844 – 24 August 1883; Reason for succession failure: July Revolution	Succeeded by Philippe VII or Jean III
