= Louis Pierre Louvel =

French saddler and assassin (1783–1820)

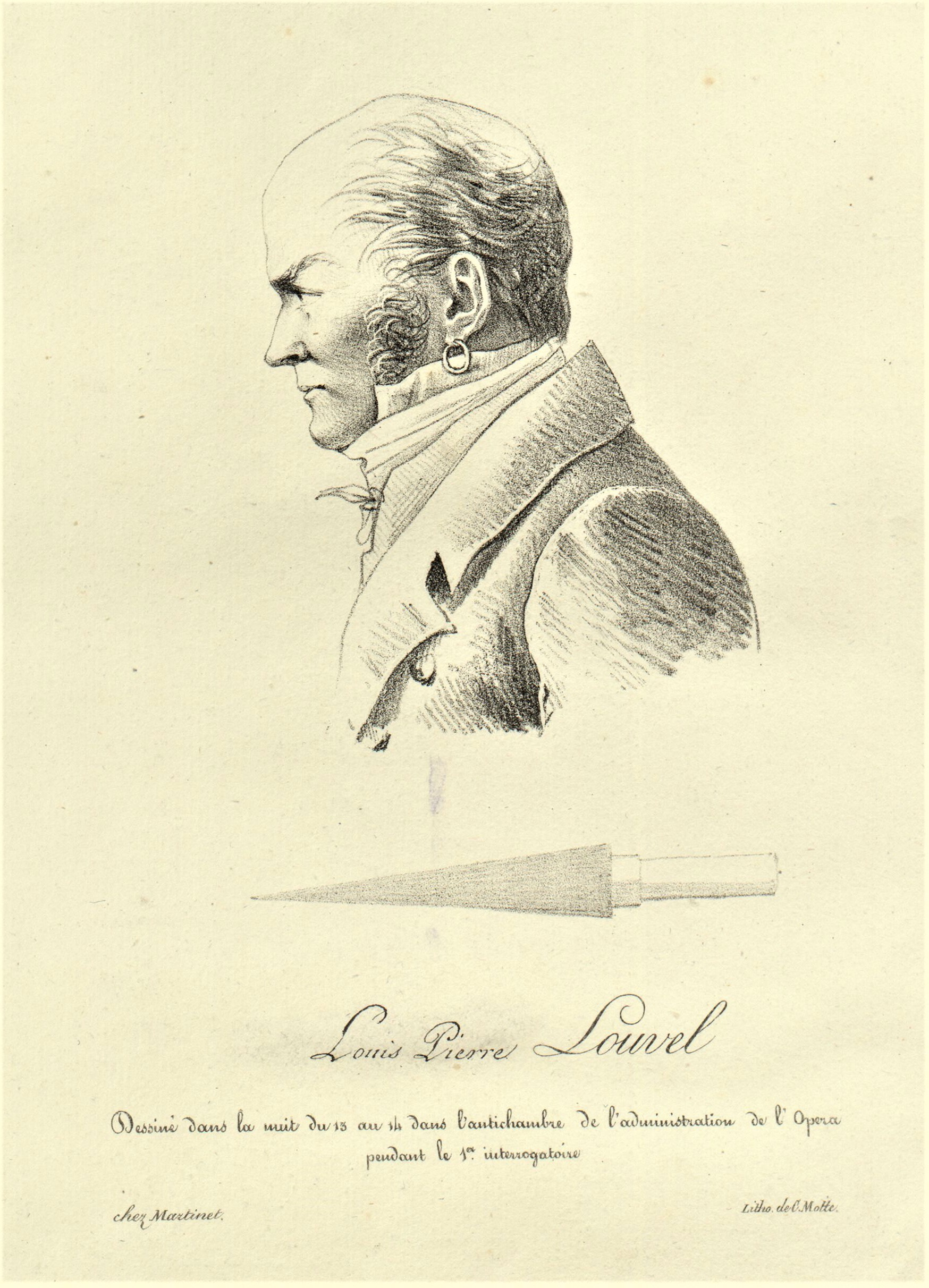
Portrait of Louvel made during his interrogation

Louis Pierre Louvel (7 October 1783 – 7 June 1820) was the assassin of Charles Ferdinand, Duke of Berry.

Born in Versailles, Louvel was the son of a haberdasher, completed an apprenticeship as a saddler, and entered an artillery regiment of the French Imperial Army in 1806. During the Hundred Days of Napoleon's return from Elba in 1815 he became a saddler in the Royal Stables, retaining the position after Napoleon's downfall.

== Assassin ==
The political events of the Bourbon Restoration aroused in Louvel a hatred of the House of Bourbon, and he finally decided to start the extermination of the royal house by assassinating its youngest member, the Duke of Berry, son of the future Charles X, who was brother and heir presumptive of the reigning Louis XVIII. On the night of 13 February 1820, as the duke was leaving the Paris Opera and leading his wife Marie-Caroline to her carriage, Louvel stabbed him with a knife in the right side of the body. The duke was mortally wounded and died on the next day, but asked to pardon his murderer.

Louvel was seized at the scene of the crime. An official investigation revealed that he had no accomplices. He was executed by guillotine in Paris on 7 June 1820.
