= Charles Ferdinand, Duke of Berry =

Member of the French royal family (1778–1820)

Charles Ferdinand
- Duke of Berry
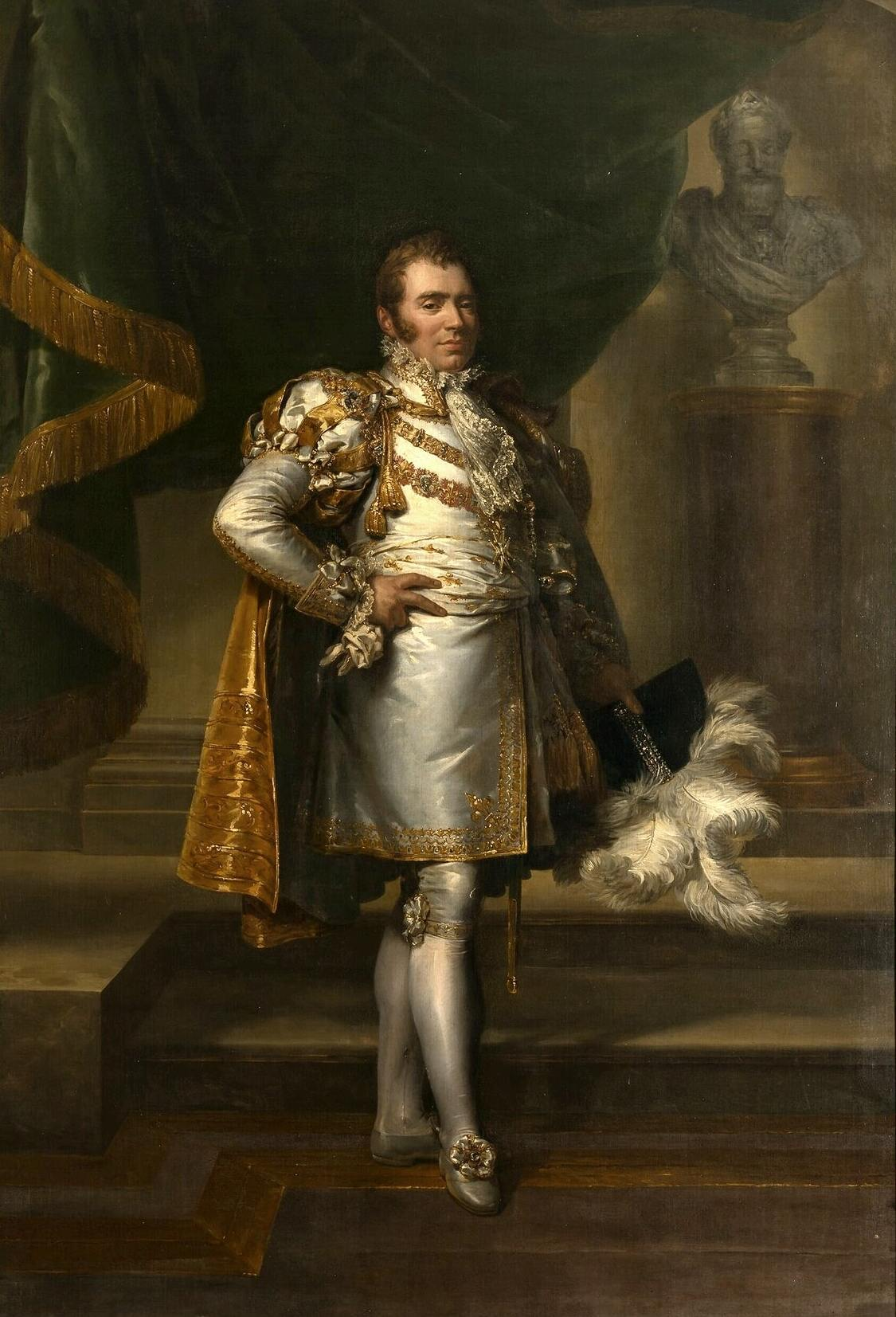
- Portrait of the Duke of Berry by François Gérard, 1820
- Born: 24 January 1778; Palace of Versailles, France
- Died: 14 February 1820 (aged 42); Paris, France
- Burial: Basilica of Saint-Denis
- Spouse: Marie Caroline of Naples and Sicily (m. 1816)
- Issue Detail: Louise, Duchess of Parma; Henri, Count of Chambord; Charlotte, comtesse d'Issoudun (illegitimate)
Names
- Charles Ferdinand de Bourbon
- House: Bourbon
- Father: Charles, Count of Artois (later Charles X)
- Mother: Maria Theresa of Savoy

Charles Ferdinand d'Artois, Duke of Berry (24 January 1778 – 14 February 1820), was the third child and younger son of Charles, Count of Artois (later King Charles X of France), and Maria Theresa of Savoy. In 1820 he was assassinated at the Paris Opera by Louis Pierre Louvel, a Bonapartist. In June 1832, two years after the overthrow of Charles X, an unsuccessful royalist insurrection in the Vendée was led by Charles Ferdinand's widow, Marie-Caroline, in an attempt to restore their son Henri, Comte de Chambord, to the French throne.

== Biography ==
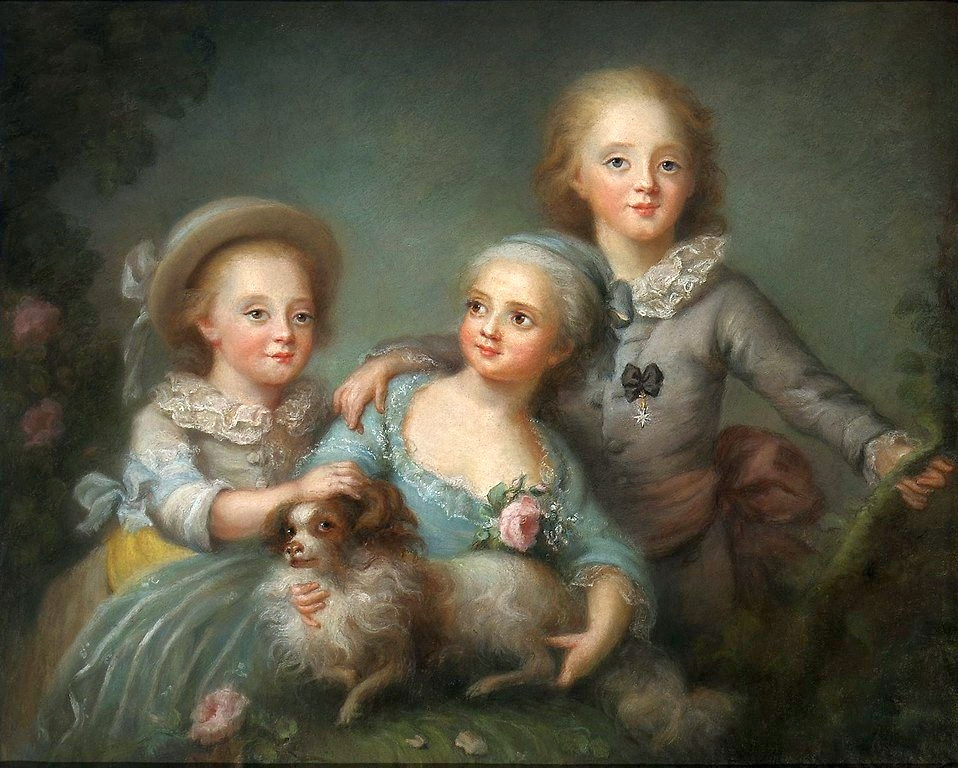
Charles Ferdinand (left) with his older brother Louis Antoine and sister Sophie, 1781.

Arms of the Duke of Berry showing the fleurs-de-lis of France and the red bordure embattled used by his father (as Count of Artois) before ascending the throne.

Arms of Charlotte Marie Augustine de Bourbon

Charles Ferdinand d'Artois, Duke of Berry, was born at Versailles. He was the third child and second son of Charles, Count of Artois, younger brother of Kings Louis XVI and Louis XVIII and himself the future King Charles X. His mother Maria Theresa of Savoy was a daughter of King Victor Amadeus III of Sardinia and Maria Antonietta of Spain (youngest daughter of Philip V of Spain).

As his father was a fils de France, but not heir apparent, Charles Ferdinand was only a petit-fils de France, and thus bore his father's appanage title as surname while an emigré. After the Restoration in 1815, his father was heir presumptive, so Charles Ferdinand was allowed the higher rank of a fils de France (used in his marriage contract, his death certificate, et cetera). Since he was already dead when his father became king, he and his surviving daughter always had "Artois" as surname.

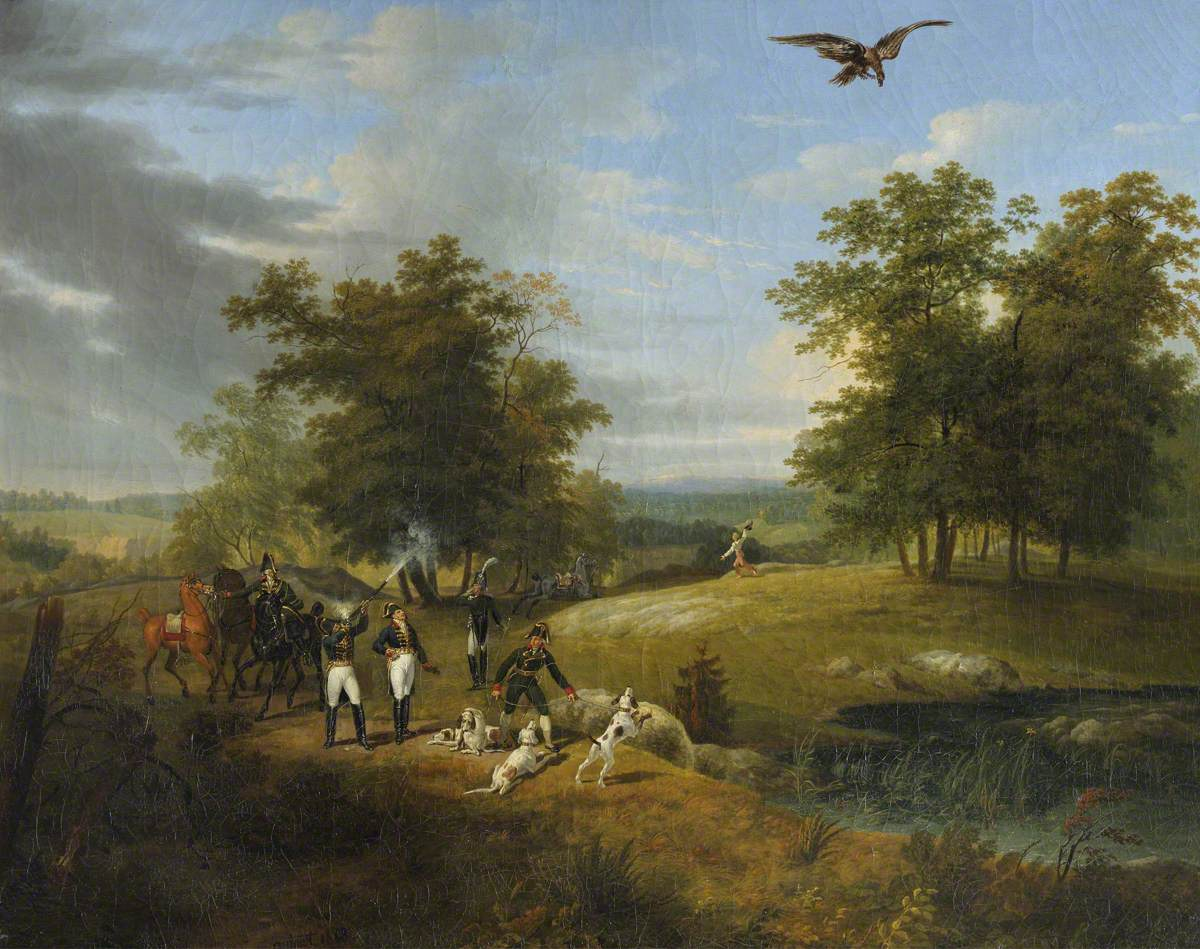
The Duke of Berry Shooting an Eagle in the Forest of Fontainebleau by Hippolyte Lecomte, 1818

During the French Revolution, he left France with his father, then Count of Artois, and joined the counter-revolutionary Army of Condé of his cousin, Louis Joseph, Prince of Condé, serving from 1792 to 1797. He fought in the Rhine Campaign of 1796, and achieved particular distinction at the Battle of Emmendingen and the Battle of Schliengen.

He afterwards joined the Russian army, and in 1801 took up his residence in England, where he remained for thirteen years. During that time he had a relationship with an Englishwoman, Amy Brown Freeman. The Encyclopædia Britannica Eleventh Edition (1911) described her as his wife, but that is highly unlikely.

In 1814, the duke set out for France. His frank, open manners gained him some favour with his countrymen, and Louis XVIII named him commander-in-chief of the army at Paris on the return of Napoleon from Elba. He was, however, unable to retain the loyalty of his troops, and retired to Ghent during the Hundred Days. On 17 June 1816, following negotiations by the French ambassador, the Duke of Blacas, he married Princess Maria-Carolina of Naples (1798–1870), oldest daughter of then hereditary Prince Francis of Naples.

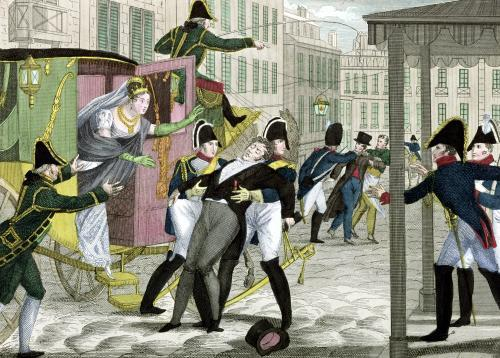
Assassination of Charles Ferdinand, Duke of Berry, while departing a Parisian opera house at night.

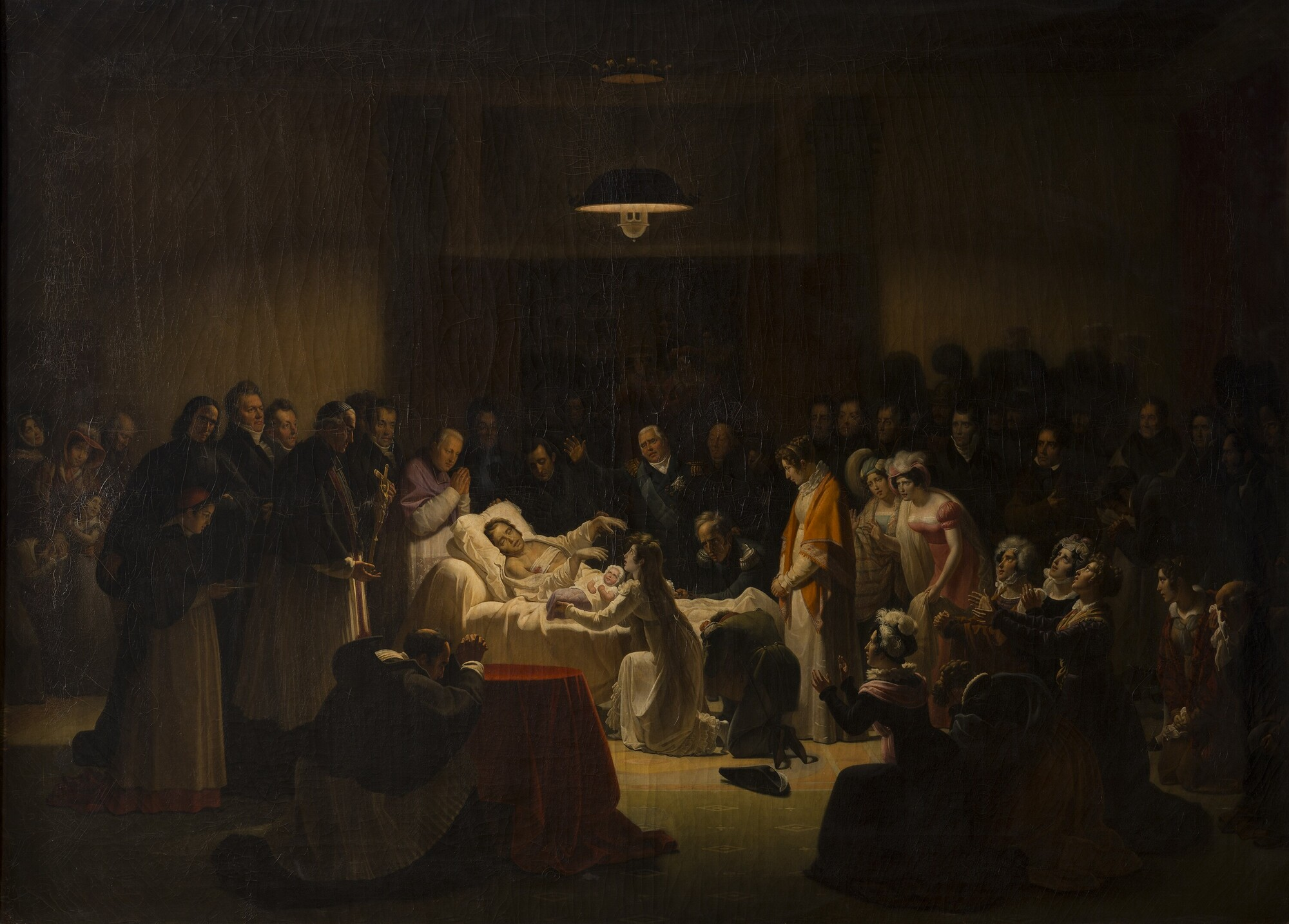
The Death of the Duke of Berry by Alexandre Menjaud

Three children were born before the duke's death, with one surviving infancy. His daughter, Louise d'Artois, born in 1819, married Charles III of Parma.

On 13 February 1820, the Duke of Berry was stabbed and mortally wounded when leaving the opera house in Paris with his wife, and died the next day. The assassin was a saddle maker named Louis Pierre Louvel, a Bonapartist opposed to the monarchy. Seven months after his death, the Duke's wife gave birth to their fourth child, Henri, who received the title of Duke of Bordeaux, but is better known in history as the Count of Chambord. In the view of the Legitimists, Henri was (from 1844 to 1883) King of France, as Henry V.

The assassination had significant political consequences for the Bourbon Restoration. It contributed to the fall of the liberal ministry of Élie, duc Decazes, and strengthened the influence of the ultra-royalists. The government subsequently adopted a more conservative course, including electoral changes that increased the political weight of wealthier voters. The electoral law of June 1820, known as the Law of the Double Vote, allowed the wealthiest eligible voters to participate in an additional round of elections.

== Issue ==
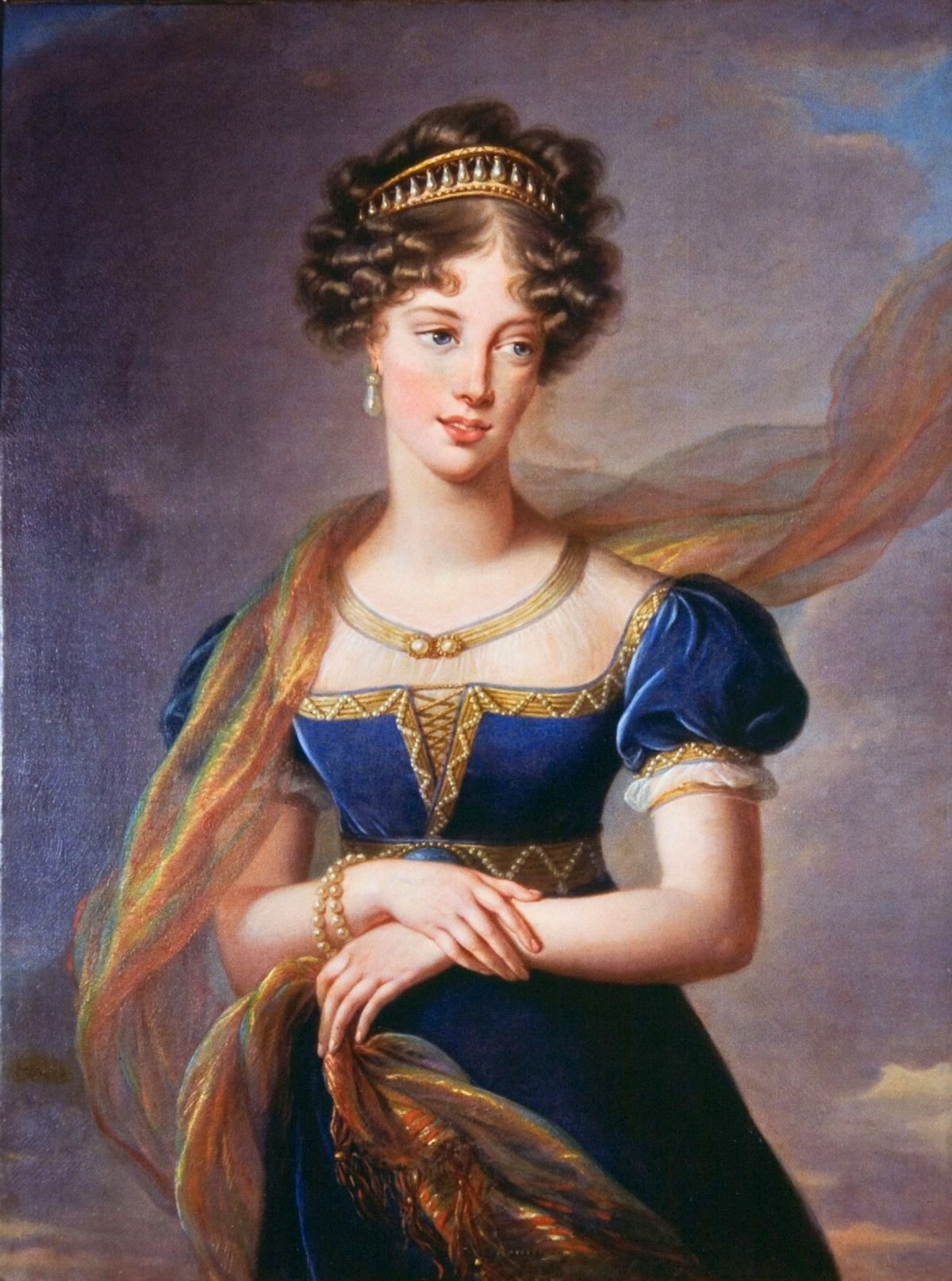
Portrait of the Duchess of Berry by Élisabeth Vigée Le Brun, 1824

With his wife, Maria Carolina of Bourbon-Sicily, the Duke of Berry had four children, of whom only two survived for more than a day:

1. Louise Élisabeth d'Artois (13 July 1817 – 14 July 1817).
2. Louis d'Artois (born and died 13 September 1818).
3. Louise Marie Thérèse d'Artois (21 September 1819 – 1 February 1864); married Charles III, Duke of Parma. Had issue.
4. Henri d'Artois, Duke of Bordeaux and Count of Chambord (29 September 1820 – 24 August 1883); married Archduchess Maria Theresa of Austria-Este. No issue.

In addition, the Duke had several illegitimate offspring:

- With Mary Bullhorn, a Scottish actress:
1. Marie de la Boulaye (1807 – ?), married Henri-Louis Bérard. No issue.

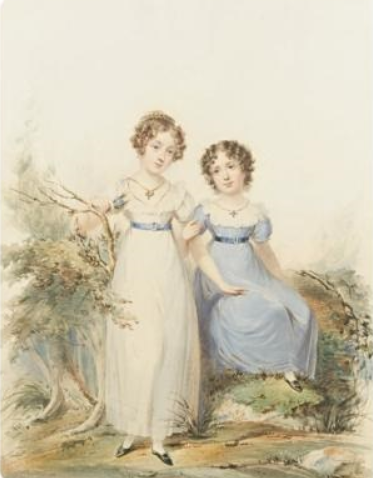
Charlotte and Louise

- With Amy Brown Freeman (whose daughters are the only illegitimate issue whom Berry recognized, on his deathbed):
1. Charlotte Marie Augustine de Bourbon, comtesse d'Issoudun (13 July 1808 – 13 July 1886), married in 1823 to Ferdinand de Faucigny-Lucinge, Prince de Lucinge.
2. Louise Marie Charlotte de Bourbon, comtesse de Vierzon (29 December 1809 – 26 December 1891), married in 1827 to Charles-Athanase de Charette, Baron de la Contrie. Her son Athanase-Charles-Marie Charette de la Contrie was a military commander and became a general for France and other nations. He married Antoinette Van Leer Polk, a great-niece of James Knox Polk, the 11th President of the United States.
- With Eugénie Virginie Oreille (1795 – 1875):
1. Charles Louis Auguste Oreille de Carrière (4 March 1815 – 30 August 1858), married in 1846 to Elisabeth Jugan, with whom he had a son Charles, a lyric artist, married but without surviving issue.
2. Ferdinand Oreille de Carrière (10 October 1820 – 27 December 1876), married in 1860 to Louise Eugénie Ancelle, with whom he had a daughter, Léonie, who married and left several children.
- With Marie Sophie de La Roche (1795 – 1883):
1. Ferdinand de La Roche (24 August 1817 – 24 December 1908), married in 1849 to Claudine Gabrielle Claire de Bachet de Méziriac. No issue.
2. Charles de La Roche (30 March 1820 – 12 January 1901), married in 1840 to Julie Dolé, with whom he had four children.
- With Louise Melanie Thiryfoq (? – 1887):
1. Louise Charlotte Antoinette Aglaé Thiryfoq (15 October 1819 – 25 May 1843), married in 1839 to Gaston du Charron, Comte du Portail.
- With Lucie Cosnefroy de Saint-Ange (1797 – 1870):
1. Alix Mélanie Cosnefroy de Saint-Ange (16 September 1820 – 11 June 1892).

Four of his children – the Count of Chambord, Ferdinand Oreille de Carrière, Charles de La Roche and Mélanie Cosnefroy de Saint-Ange – were born after his death.

== Ancestors ==
Ancestors of Charles Ferdinand, Duke of Berry

8. Louis XV of France
4. Louis, Dauphin of France
9. Marie Leszczyńska
2. Charles X of France
10. Augustus III of Poland
5. Maria Josepha of Saxony
11. Maria Josepha of Austria
1. Charles Ferdinand, Duke of Berry
12. Charles Emmanuel III of Sardinia
6. Victor Amadeus III of Sardinia
13. Polyxena of Hesse-Rotenburg
3. Marie Thérèse of Savoy
14. Philip V of Spain
7. Maria Antonia Ferdinanda of Spain
15. Elisabeth Farnese
