= Charles-Nicolas Lafond =

French artist (1773–1835)

Charles-Nicolas Lafond'
- Born: 1773; France
- Died: 1835 (aged 61–62)
- Occupation: Artist

Charles-Nicolas Lafond (1773–1835) was a French artist painting in the neoclassical style. He produced history painting and portraits. Amongst his notable works was Josephine at the Hospice de la Maternité. He regularly exhibited at the Salon in Paris. His The Duchess of Berry Presenting the Duke of Bordeaux appeared at the Salon of 1822.

== Gallery ==
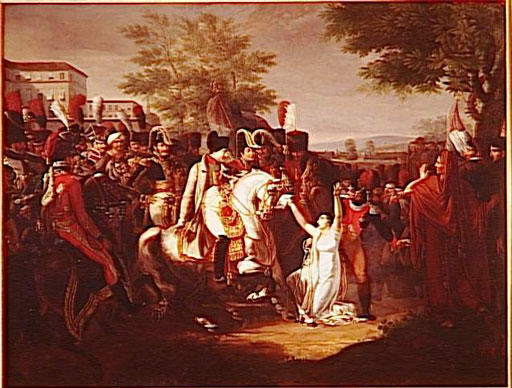
Napoleon's clemency towards Mademoiselle de Saint-Simon, 1808

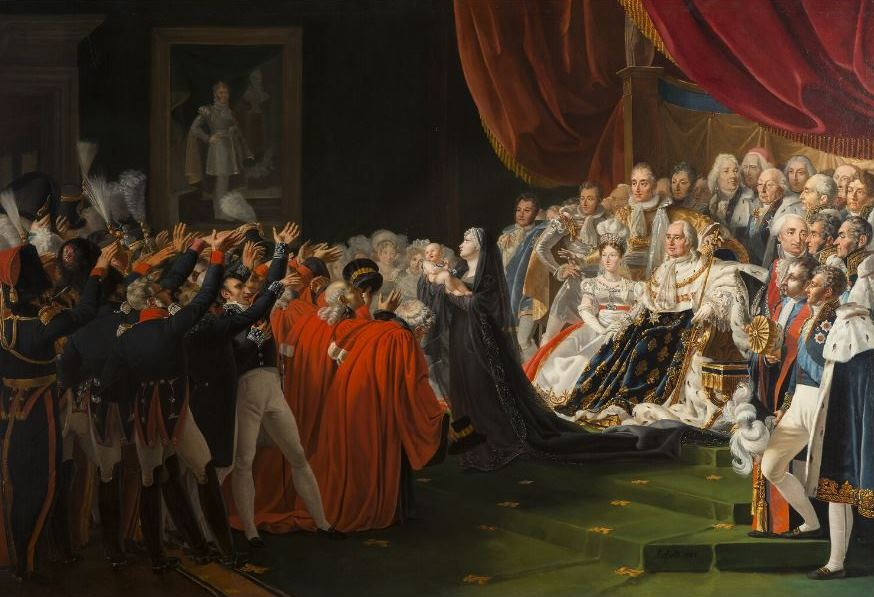
The Duchess of Berry Presenting the Duke of Bordeaux, 1821

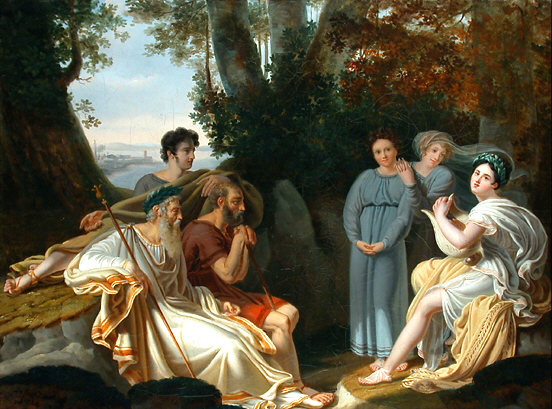
Sappho Sings for Homer, 1824

== Bibliography ==
- Balducci, Temma & Jensen. Heather Belnap. Women, Femininity and Public Space in European Visual Culture, 1789–1914. Ashgate Publishing, 2014.
- Kiefer, Carol Solomon. The Empress Josephine: Art & Royal Identity. Mead Art Museum, Amherst College, 2005.
- Moureau, Francois. Le théâtre des voyages: une scénographie de l'âge classique. Presses Paris Sorbonne, 2005.
