= Alexandre Menjaud =

French painter

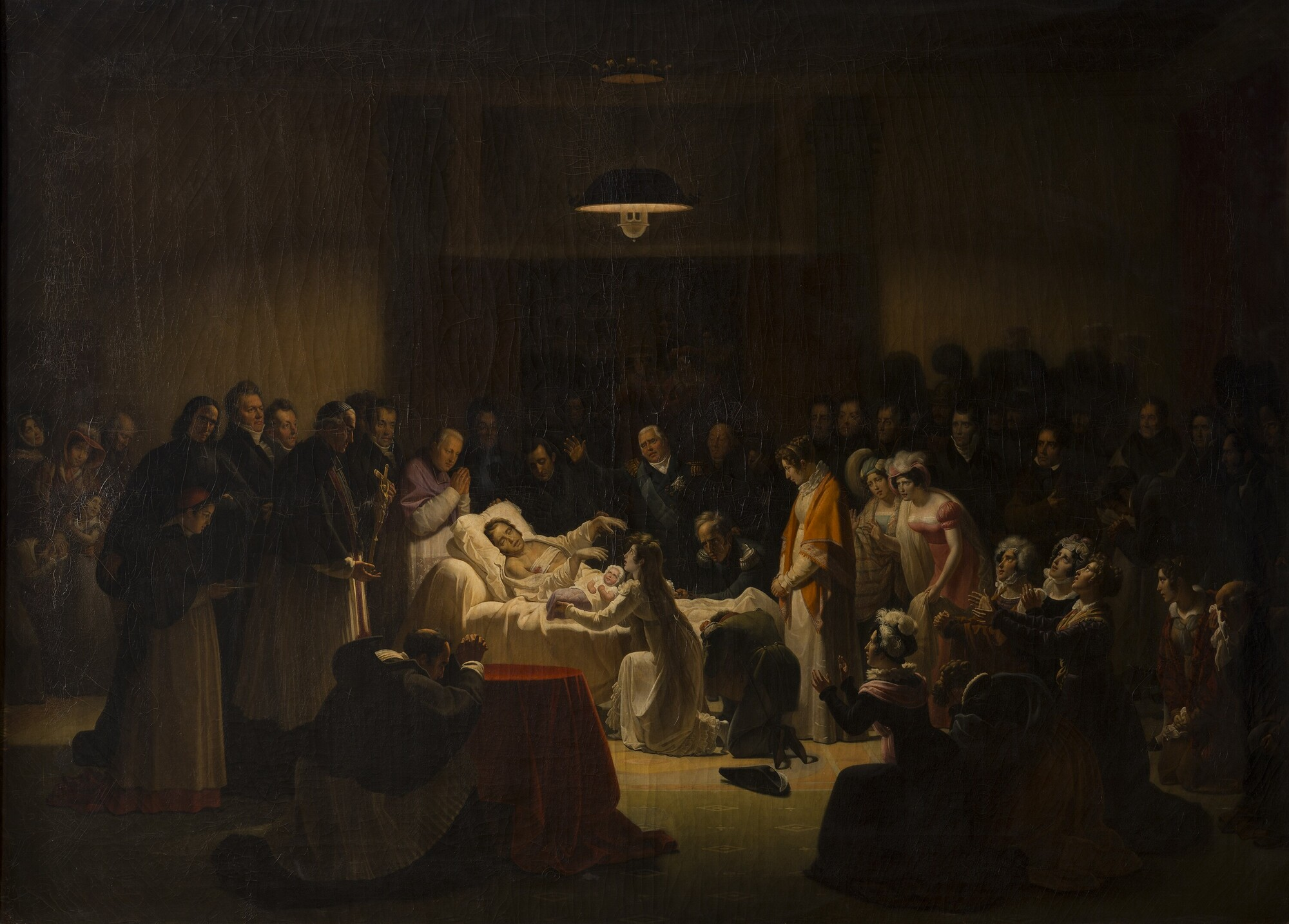
The Death of the Duke of Berry, 1824. Exhibited at the Salon of 1824

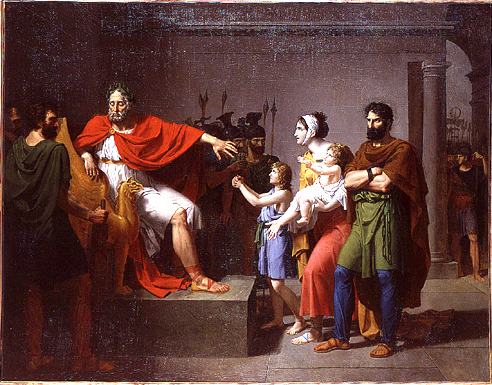
Julius Sabinus and Epponina before Vespasian

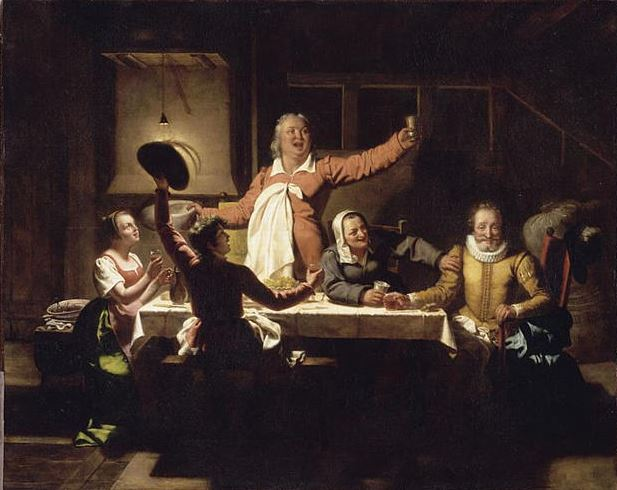
Henry IV and the Miller, Michaud

Alexandre Menjaud (1773 – February 1832) was a French history painter in the Troubadour style. Most of his works were of very modest size.

== Biography ==
He was born in Paris. He received his initial training from Jean-Baptiste Regnault, who was a Neoclassical painter. His first exhibition at the Salon came in 1796 and he would continue to exhibit there until his death.

In 1802, he was awarded the Prix de Rome for his depiction of Julius Sabinus and Epponina before Vespasian. From 1802 to 1806, he is listed as a pensioner at the Academy of France in Rome, a period when young French artists were in a rather tenuous position due to the former occupation of Rome by the French Army.

By 1808, when the French had occupied Rome again, he was back in Paris and presented a painting at the Salon that showed King Henry IV having a drink with a humble miller named Michaud. It was a great success and he subsequently focused on scenes from French, rather than Classical history.

He received several commissions from the Imperial Family. After the First Restoration, he created a series of works on the lives of the great artists, such as Raphael and Tintoretto.

Menjaud died in Paris in 1832.
