= Sostro District =

Sostro District Četrtna skupnost Sostro
- District
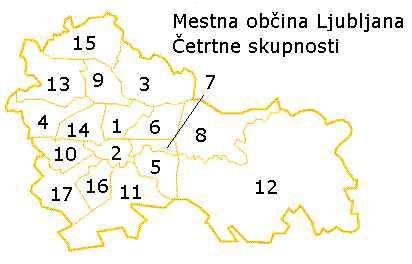
- Map of districts in Ljubljana. The Sostro District is number 12.

- Location in Slovenia
- Coordinates: 46°1′31″N 14°40′17″E
- Country: Slovenia
- Traditional region: Upper Carniola
- Statistical region: Central Slovenia
- Municipality: Ljubljana

Area
  - Total: 88.56 km^{2} (34.19 sq mi)

Population (2014)
  - Total: 6,719

The Sostro District (pronounced [ˈsoːstɾɔ]; Slovene: Četrtna skupnost Sostro), or simply Sostro, is a district (mestna četrt) of the City Municipality of Ljubljana, the capital of Slovenia. It is named after the former village of Sostro.

== Geography ==
The Sostro District is the largest district of the capital and is located in the eastern part of Ljubljana. It is bounded on the west by the A2 Freeway and a line crossing Dobrunje Hill (Dobrunjski hrib) and Zadvor Hill (Zadvorski hrib); on the south by the Municipality of Grosuplje; on the east by the Municipality of Litija; and on the north by a line through the hills south of the Sava and Ljubljanica rivers, Šivnik Creek, and then the Ljubljanica River itself. The district includes the former villages of Dobrunje, Sostro, Zadvor, and Zavoglje.

The Sostro area is extensively forested and for this reason it is sometimes styled the "green lungs of Ljubljana." Historically, the wood from these forests was used for building houses, stables, and beehives, and as a basis for various crafts. Even nowadays, local people gather berries, mushrooms, and chestnuts here and sell them at the Ljubljana market.

=== Lehnjak Falls ===
Near the village of Volavlje is Lehnjak Falls (Lehnjakov slap). This typical karst phenomenon is covered in moss.

== Agriculture ==
Sostro also has apple, peach, cherry, and other fruit orchards. The local community organizes fruit festivals, the most popular being the Strawberry Festival in Janče.
