= Kravjek =

Kravjek may refer to multiple places in Slovenia:

- Kravjek Castle, a ruined castle northwest of Muljava, in Lower Carniola
- Spodnji Jernej, a village in the Municipality of Slovenske Konjice, named Kravjek until 1999
