= Gosdorf =

- Former municipality
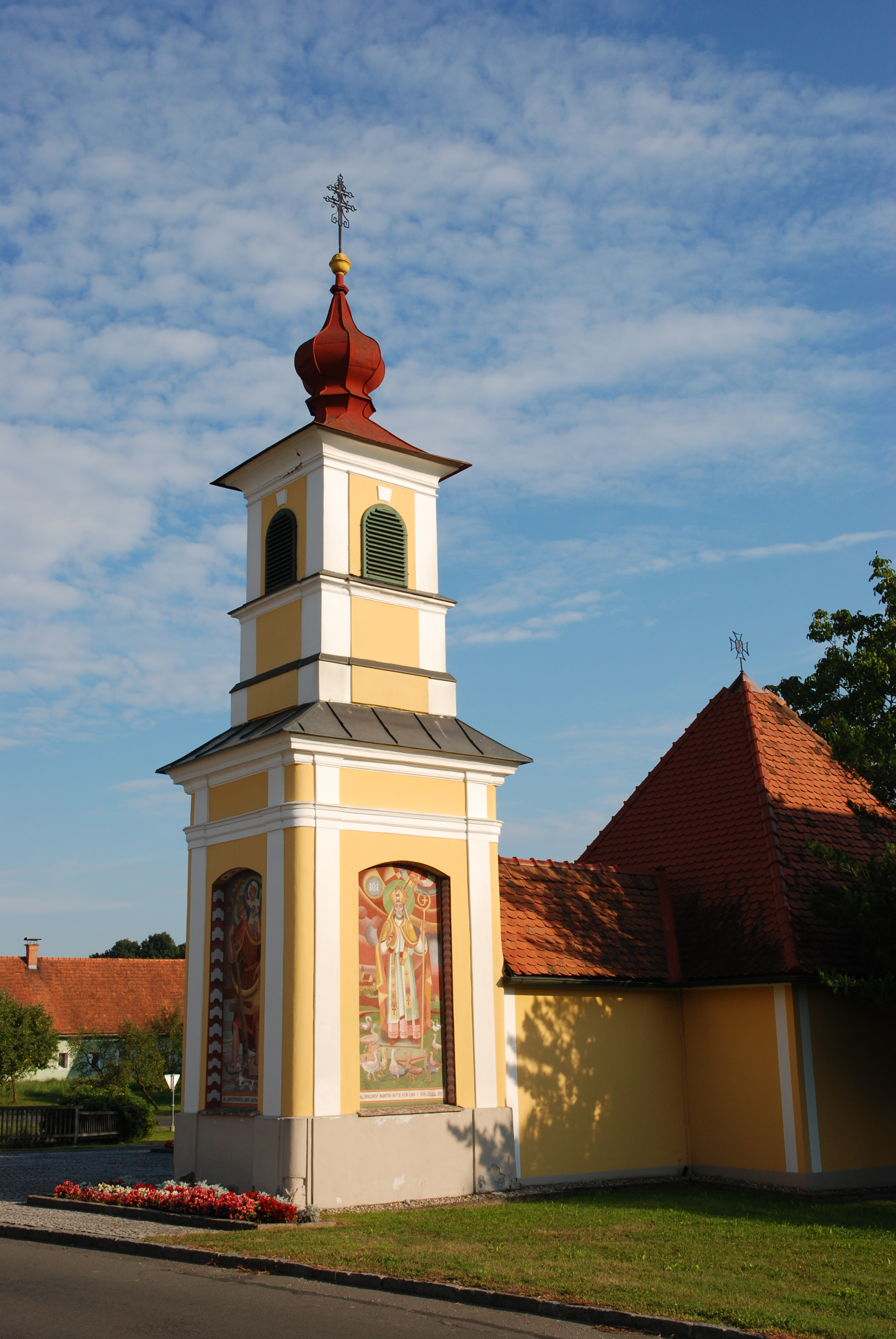
- Chapel in Gosdorf

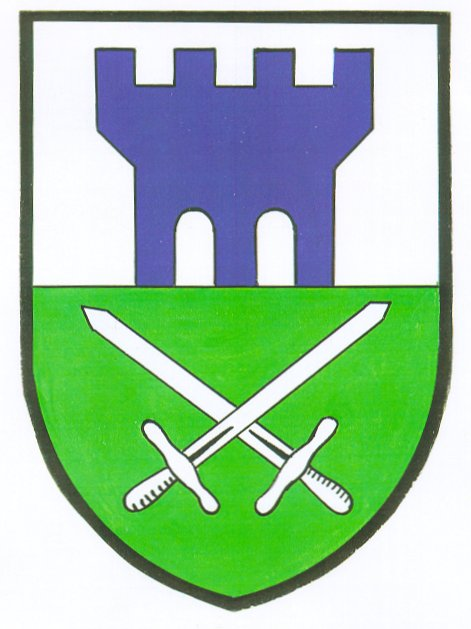
- Coat of arms

- Location within Austria
- Coordinates: 46°43′33.16″N 15°47′41.38″E
- Country: Austria
- State: Styria
- District: Südoststeiermark

Area
  - Total: 15.64 km^{2} (6.04 sq mi)
- Elevation: 234 m (768 ft)

Population (1 January 2016)
  - Total: 1,150
  - Density: 73.5/km^{2} (190/sq mi)
- Time zone: UTC+1 (CET)
  - Summer (DST): UTC+2 (CEST)
- Postal code: 8482
- Area code: 03472
- Vehicle registration: RA
- Website: www.gosdorf.at

Gosdorf is a municipality in the district of Südoststeiermark in the Austrian state of Styria. On 1 January 2015, administrative reform actions in Styria merged the towns of Mureck, Gosdorf, and Eichfeld, which includes the villages of Hainsdorf-Brunnsee and Oberrakitsch. The new municipality is called Mureck.

== Population ==
Historical population
Year	Pop.	±%
1869	1,005	—
1880	1,142	+13.6%
1890	1,189	+4.1%
1900	1,119	−5.9%
1910	1,129	+0.9%
1923	1,161	+2.8%
1934	1,186	+2.2%
1939	1,196	+0.8%
1951	1,272	+6.4%
1961	1,247	−2.0%
1971	1,290	+3.4%
1981	1,268	−1.7%
1990	1,279	+0.9%
2001	1,223	−4.4%
2012	1,150	−6.0%
