= Mureck =

Mureck Cmurek
- Municipality
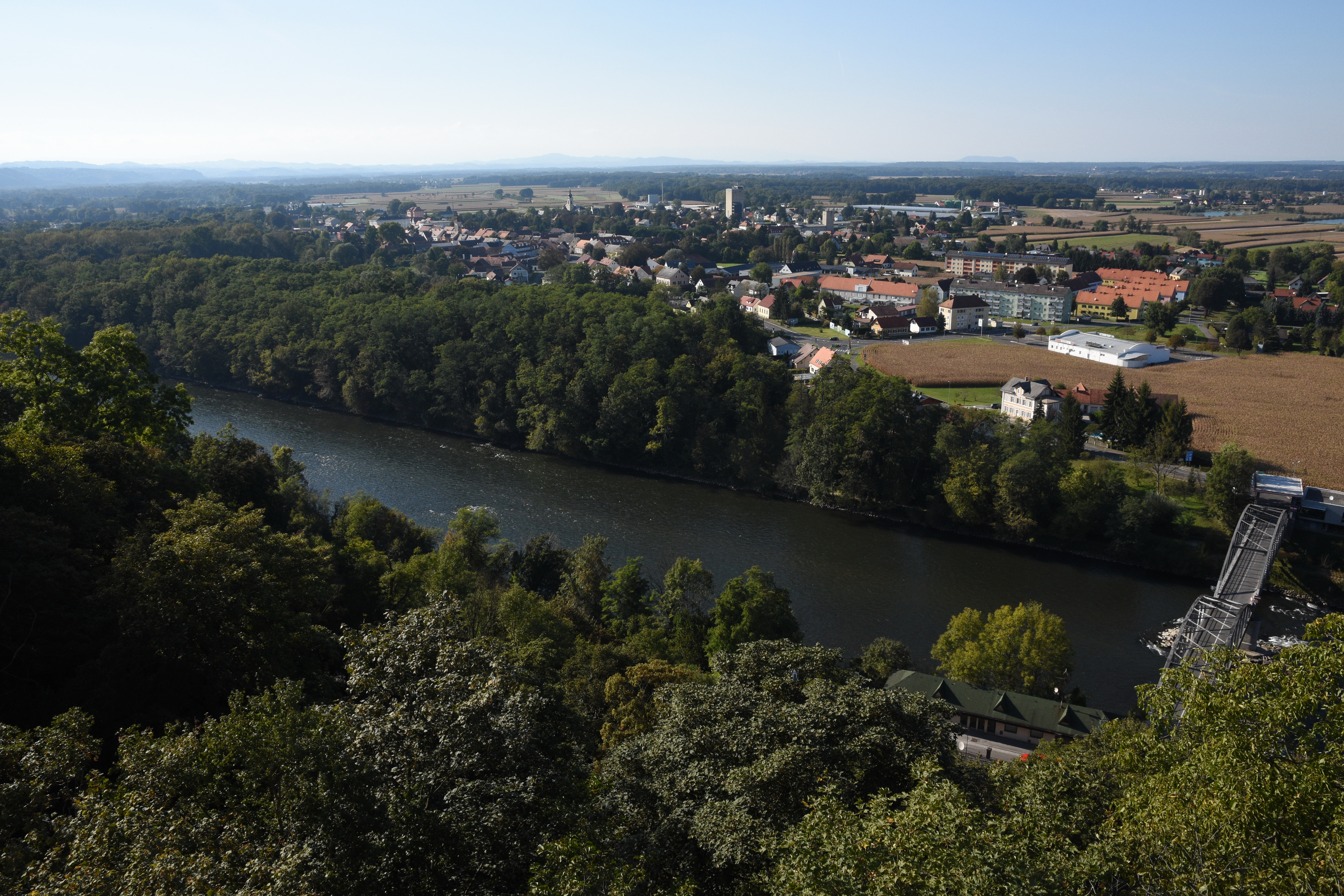

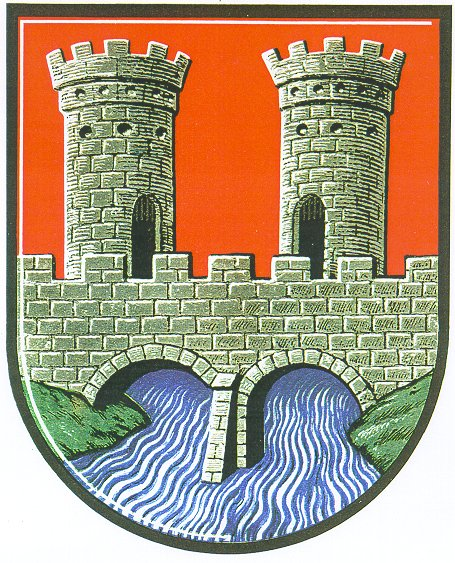
- Coat of arms

- Location within Styria#Location within Austria Mureck (Austria)
- Coordinates: 46°42′27″N 15°46′12″E
- Country: Austria
- State: Styria
- District: Südoststeiermark

Government
  - Mayor: Anton Vukan (SPÖ)

Area
  - Total: 38.68 km^{2} (14.93 sq mi)
- Elevation: 237 m (778 ft)

Population (2018-01-01)
  - Total: 3,551
  - Density: 91.80/km^{2} (237.8/sq mi)
- Time zone: UTC+1 (CET)
  - Summer (DST): UTC+2 (CEST)
- Postal code: 8480, 8482
- Area code: 03472
- Vehicle registration: SO
- Website: www.mureck.gv.at

Mureck (Slovene: Cmurek, archaic: Cmürek) is a municipality in the district of Südoststeiermark in the Austrian state of Styria. Administrative reforms in Styria led to the merging on 1 January 2015 of the formerly separate municipalities of Mureck, Gosdorf, and Eichfeld, which includes the villages of Hainsdorf-Brunnsee and Oberrakitsch. The new municipality is named Mureck.

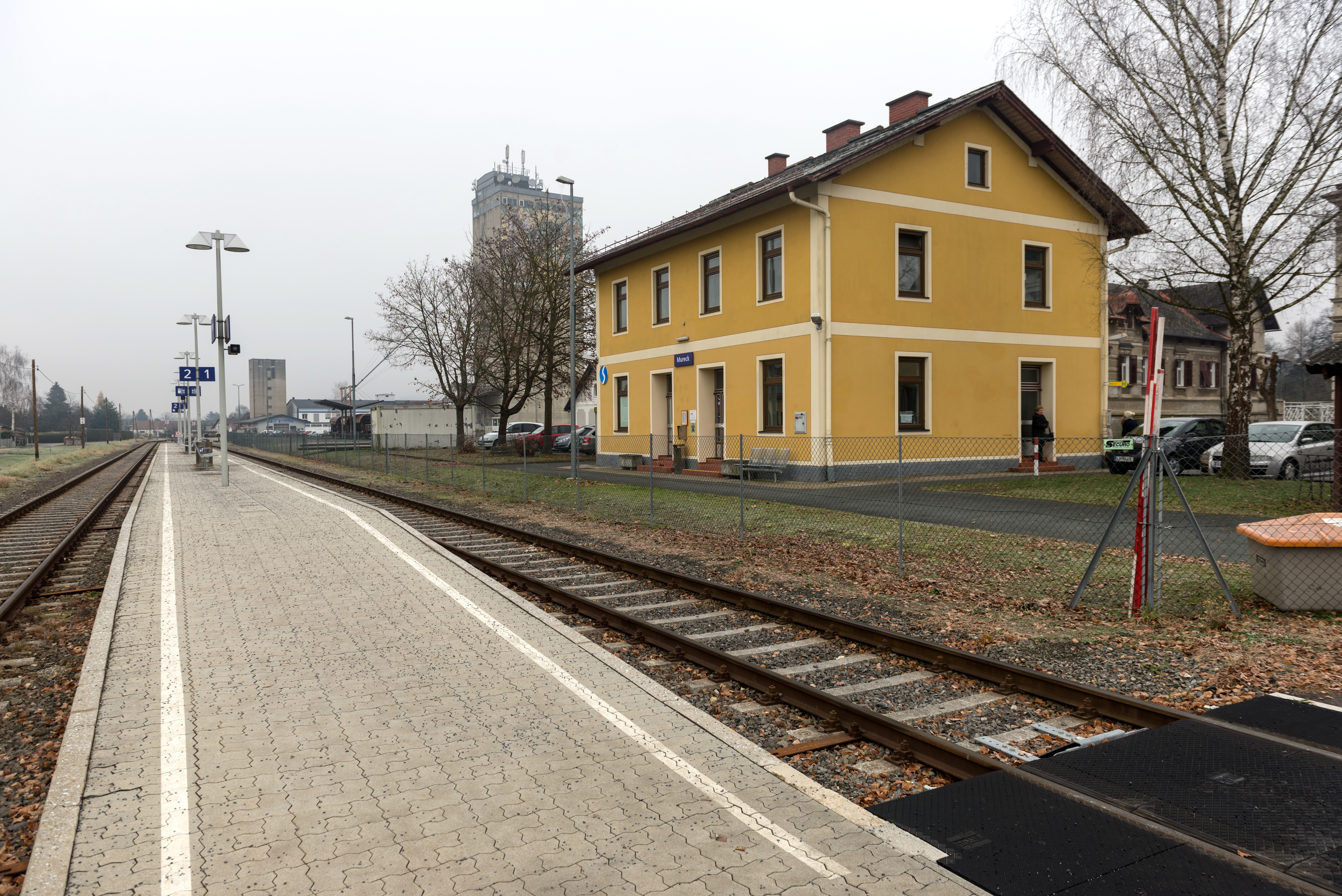
Mureck railway station

== Geography ==
Mureck is located in southern Styria, on the border with Slovenia.

=== Constituent parts of Mureck municipality ===
The municipality comprises the communities of:

- Diepersdorf (pop. 138)
- Eichfeld (349)
- Fluttendorf (59)
- Gosdorf (574)
- Hainsdorf-Brunnsee (209)
- Misselsdorf (388)
- Mureck (1570)
- Oberrakitsch (334)

== Name ==
The name Mureck was first attested in 1151 as Mŏrekke (and as Murekke in 1181, Můrekke in 1183, and Muregk in 1500). The name is a compound of Mur 'Mur River' + Old High German ecke 'edge, bend' or egge 'hill' (sometimes 'fortification'), and thus means 'bend on the Mur River' or 'hill/fortification on the Mur River'. The Slovene name Cmurek is borrowed from the Middle High German prepositional phrase ze Murekke, literally 'at Mureck'. For similar Slovene geographical names based on foreign-language prepositional phrases of location, compare Crngrob, Cven, Dragonja, Sostro, and Spuhlja.

== Population ==
Historical population

| Year | Pop. | ±% |
|---|---|---|
| 1869 | 1,302 | — |
| 1880 | 1,472 | +13.1% |
| 1890 | 1,570 | +6.7% |
| 1900 | 1,532 | −2.4% |
| 1910 | 1,541 | +0.6% |
| 1923 | 1,411 | −8.4% |

| Year | Pop. | ±% |
|---|---|---|
| 1934 | 1,529 | +8.4% |
| 1939 | 1,519 | −0.7% |
| 1951 | 2,140 | +40.9% |
| 1961 | 1,890 | −11.7% |
| 1971 | 1,824 | −3.5% |
| 1981 | 1,737 | −4.8% |

| Year | Pop. | ±% |
|---|---|---|
| 1991 | 1,585 | −8.8% |
| 2001 | 1,690 | +6.6% |
| 2011 | 1,571 | −7.0% |
| 2016 | 1,597 | +1.7% |

== Events ==
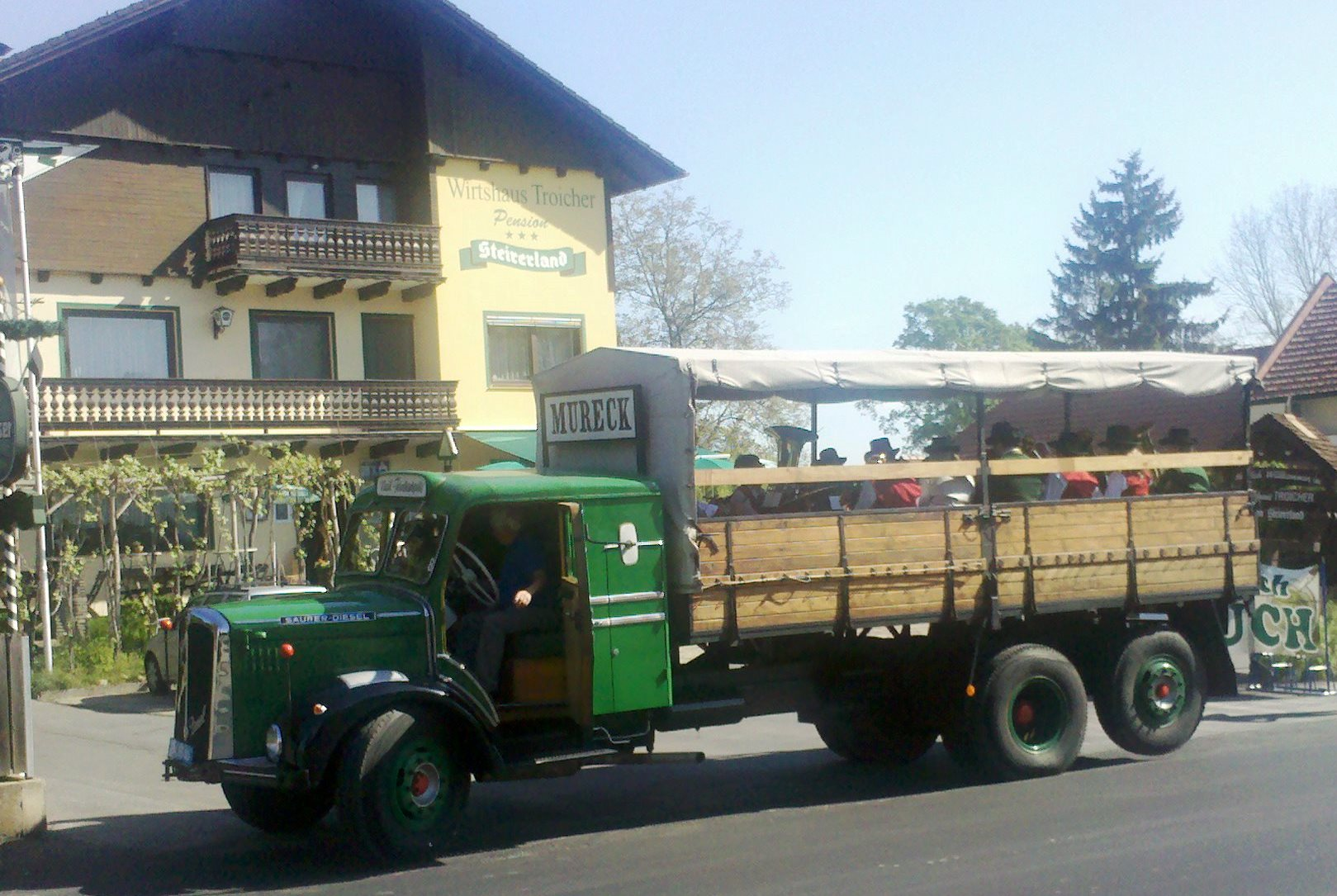
Grenzlandtrachtenkapelle Mureck playing "Weckruf" on a restored truck on 1 May

- Weckruf: since 1954 the local marching band Grenzlandtrachtenkapelle Mureck has performed the so-called wakening call (in German, Weckruf) each May 1, waking every friend of brass-band music with marching music in the early morning hours. Until 1964 all of this happened by foot; later the band started using a nicely restored truck.

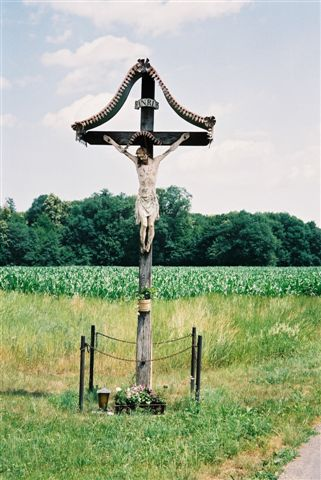
A crucifix shrine near Mureck

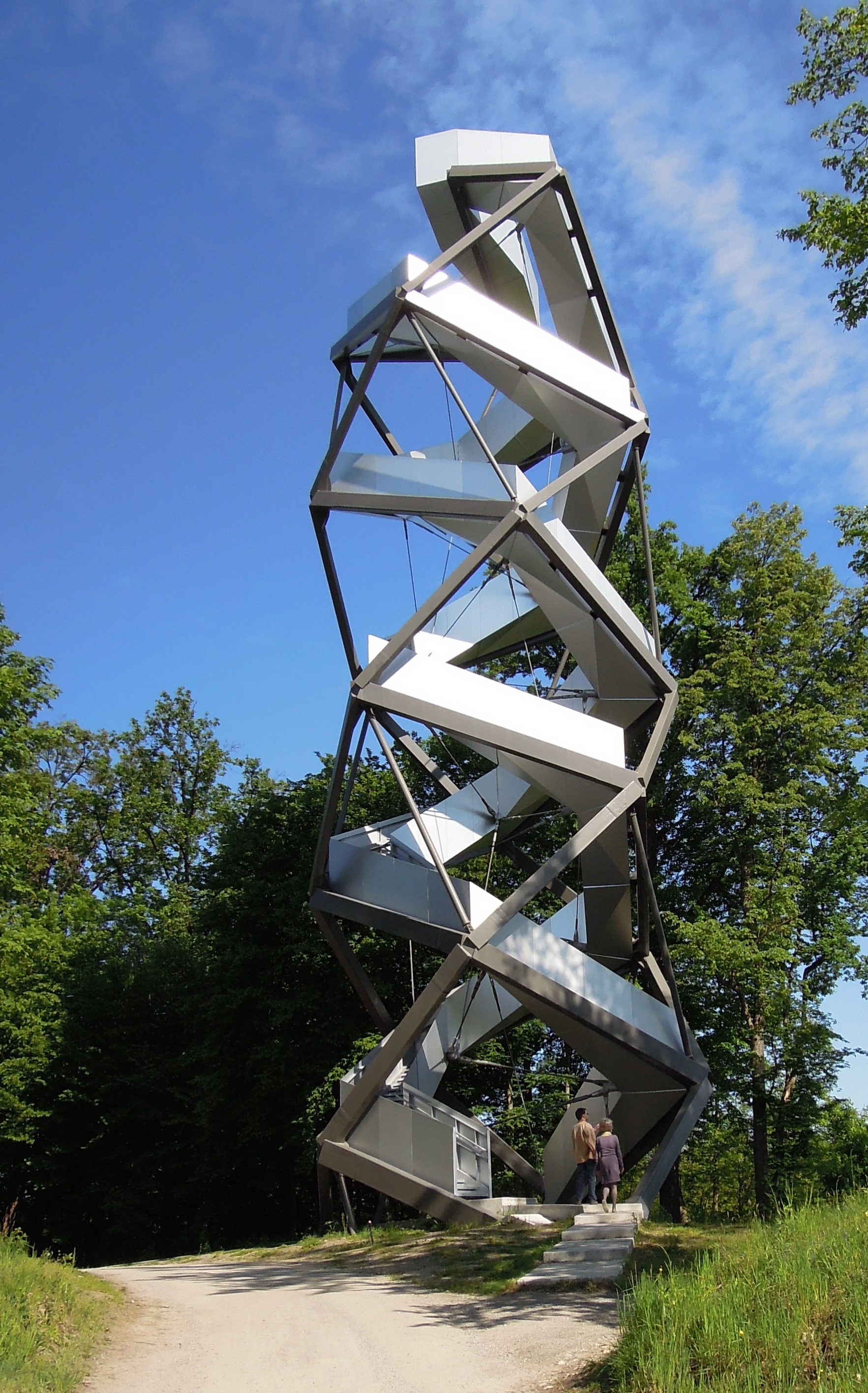
Murturm Gosdorf

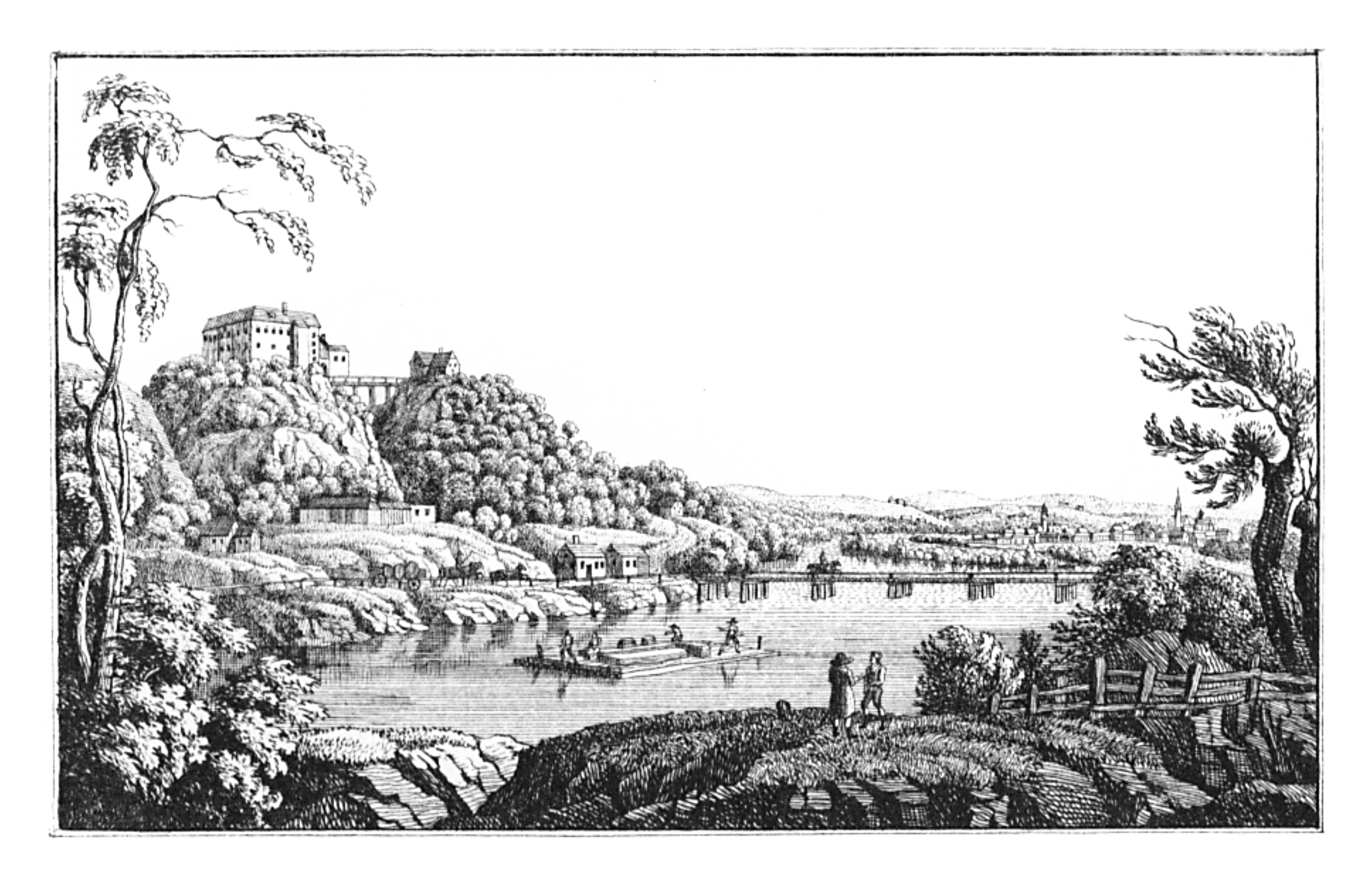
194 Schloss Ober-Mureck, Trate - J.F.Kaiser Lithografirte Ansichten der Steiermark 1830

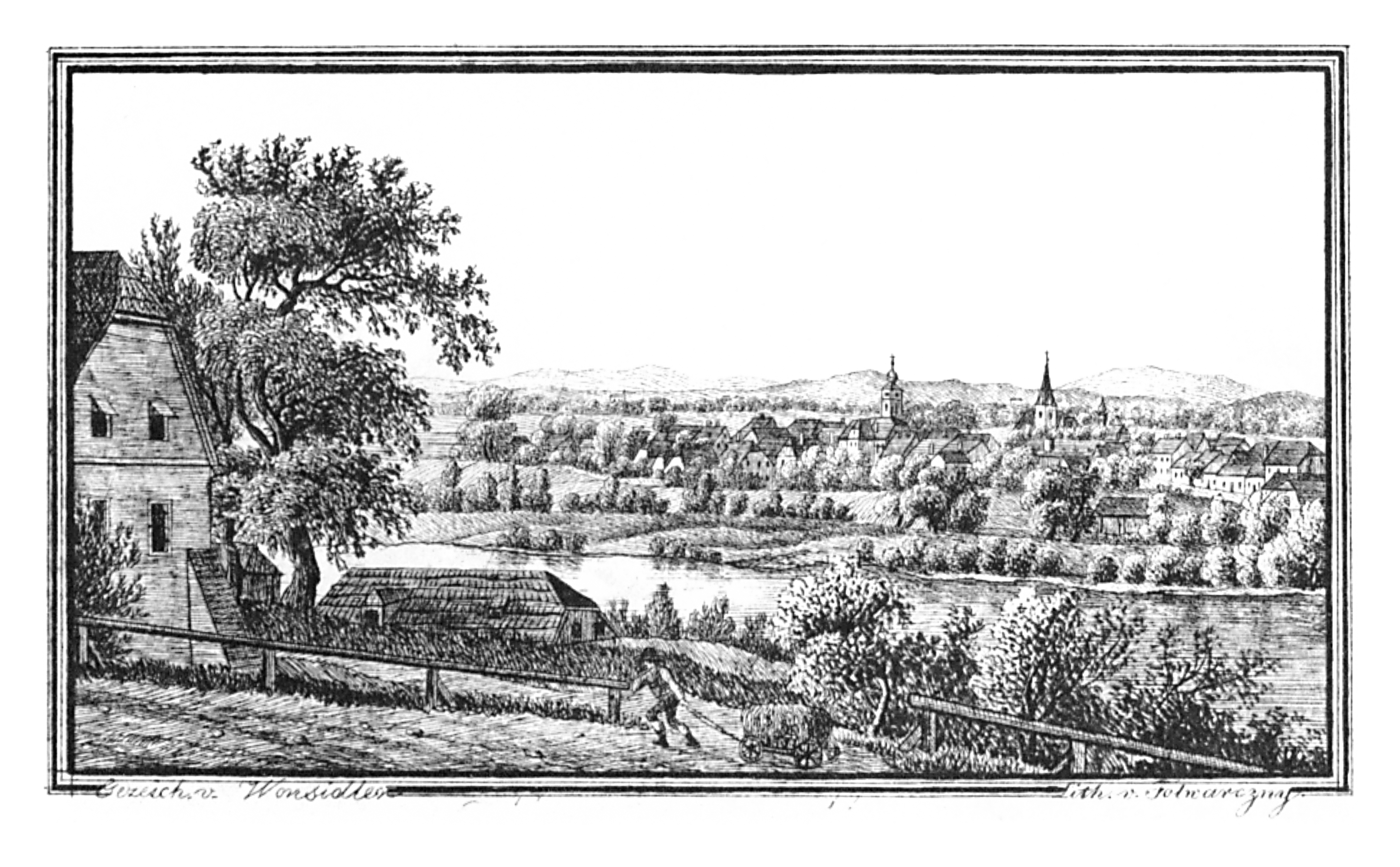
193 Markt Mureck - gez. Wonsidler, Lith. v. Folwarczni - J.F.Kaiser Lithografirte Ansichten der Steiermark 1830

== Clubs and organisations ==
=== Marching bands ===
- Grenzlandtrachtenkapelle Mureck

=== Fire departments ===
- FF Eichfeld
- FF Gosdorf
- FF Hainsdorf-Brunnsee
- FF Misselsdorf
- FF Mureck
- FF Oberrakitsch

=== Sports clubs ===
- Beachvolleyballclub
- ESV Mureck
- TUS Mureck

=== Charity and service clubs ===
- Leo Club South Styrian Unity
- Lions Club Bad Radkersburg-Mureck

== International relations ==
=== Twin towns — sister cities ===
Mureck is twinned with:

- Lenauheim, Romania
