= Spuhlja =

- Location in Slovenia
- Coordinates: 46°24′42.08″N 15°54′32.32″E
- Country: Slovenia
- Traditional region: Styria
- Statistical region: Drava
- Municipality: Ptuj

Area
  - Total: 4.61 km^{2} (1.78 sq mi)
- Elevation: 218.6 m (717 ft)

Population (2002)
  - Total: 809

Spuhlja (pronounced [ˈspuːxlja], in older sources Spuhla, German: Pichldorf) is a settlement in the Municipality of Ptuj in northeastern Slovenia. It lies east of the town of Ptuj, just north of Lake Ptuj (a reservoir on the Drava River). The area is part of the traditional region of Styria. It is now included with the rest of the municipality in the Drava Statistical Region.

== Name ==
Spuhlja was attested in written sources in 1294 as ze Puhel (and as Puͤhel in 1299 and Puhel in 1320). The name comes from the Bavarian Middle High German prepositional phrase ze puhel 'at the hill' (cf. MHG büchel 'hill'), referring to the local terrain. For similar Slovene geographical names based on foreign-language prepositional phrases of location, compare Cmurek, Crngrob, Cven, Dragonja, and Sostro.
