= Dobrunje =

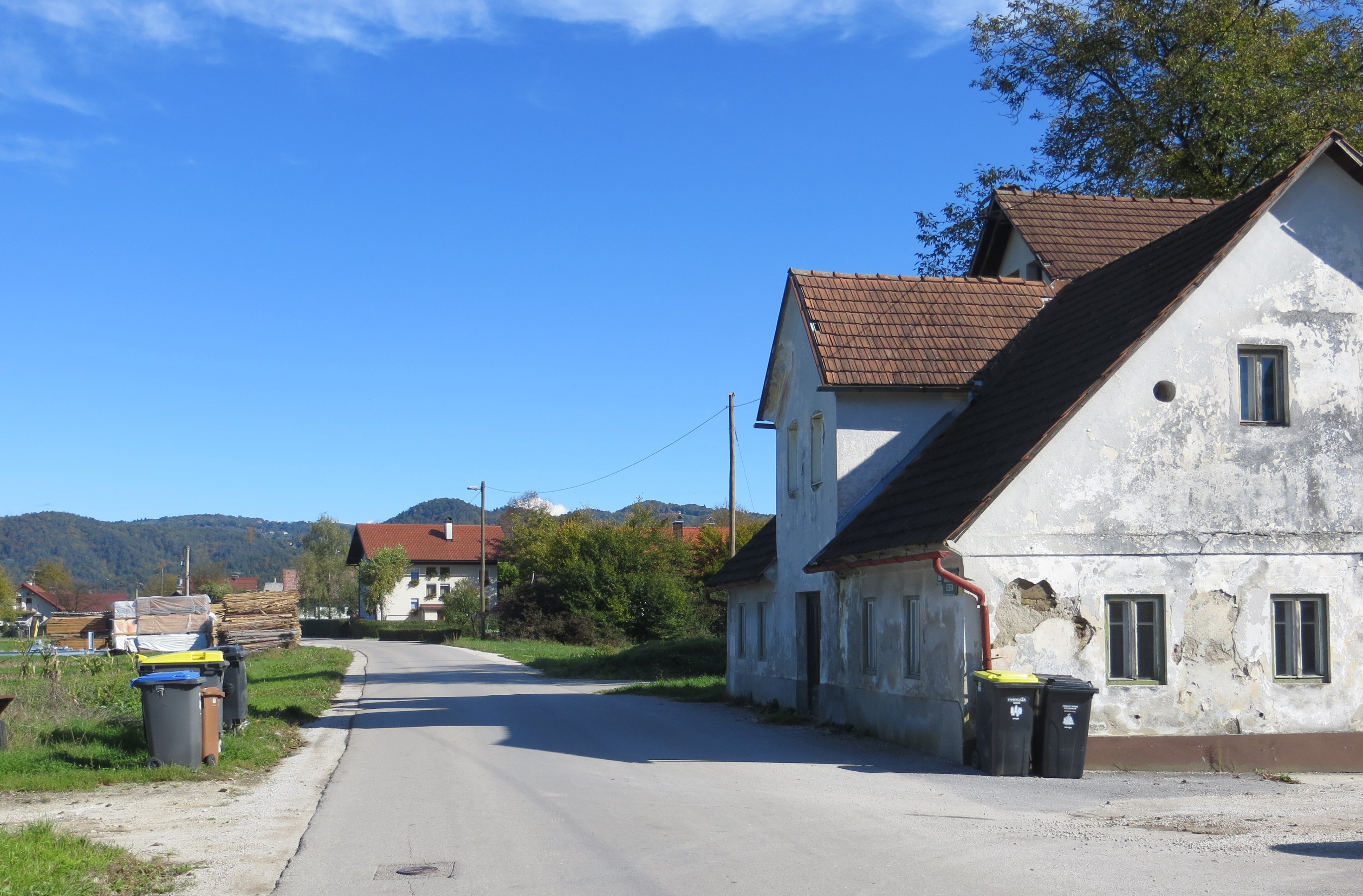

- Location in Slovenia
- Coordinates: 46°2′20.51″N 14°34′48.29″E
- Country: Slovenia
- Traditional region: Lower Carniola
- Statistical region: Central Slovenia
- Municipality: Ljubljana
- Elevation: 282.5 m (927 ft)

Dobrunje (pronounced [dɔˈbɾuːnjɛ]; German: Dobruine or Dobrouine) is a formerly independent settlement in the southeast part of the capital Ljubljana in central Slovenia. It belongs to the City Municipality of Ljubljana. It is part of the traditional region of Lower Carniola and is now included with the rest of the municipality in the Central Slovenia Statistical Region. In addition to the main settlement, Dobrunje consists of the hamlets of Devce (in the west along the road to Bizovik), Marinki (in the north along the main road to Litija), Na Trdnjavi (to the south, at the base of St. Ulrich’s Hill), Ob Cesti (to the east), and Pod Ježo (to the north, toward the Ljubljanica River). Rastučnik Creek, which begins below Orle, runs through the western part of the settlement before joining the Ljubljanica.

== Name ==
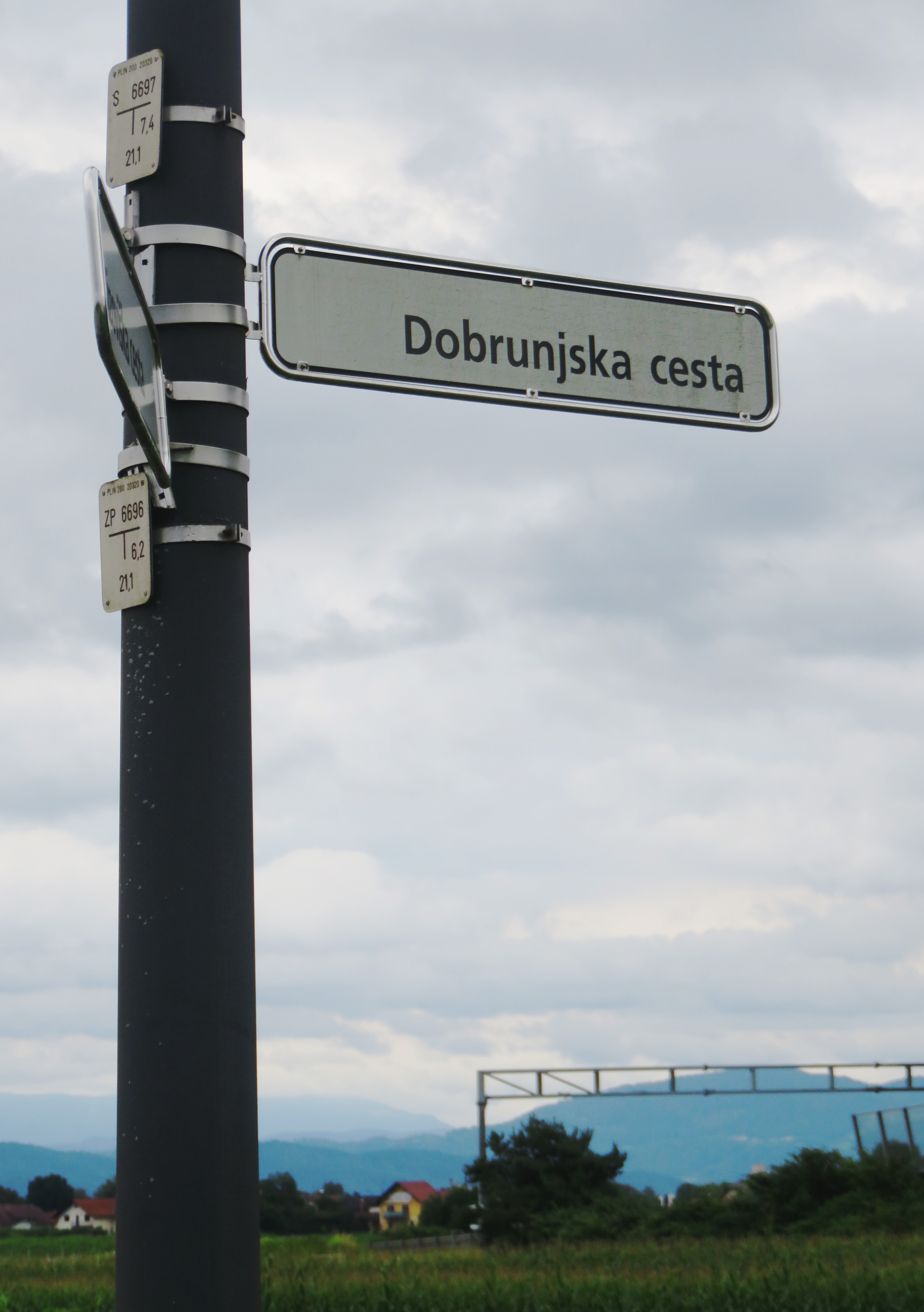
A sign for Dobrunje Street (Dobrunjska cesta) in Dobrunje

Dobrunje was first attested in 1312 as dacz Dobrown (and as Dobriewn in 1444 and Dobrün in 1490, among other spellings). The name is derived from the hypocorism *Dobrunъ, based on the adjective *dobrъ 'good' and was probably originally adjectival (i.e., *Dobrun′e selo 'Dobrunъ's village'), later undergoing conversion from a neuter singular adjective to a feminine plural noun. Živko Šifrer mentions a feudal lord named Dobrin as the source of the name. In the past the German name was Dobruine.

== History ==
Two manors belonging to lesser nobility were attested in Dobrunje in the first half of the 16th century. In the hamlet of Trdnjava, at house no. 5, there once stood a castle that was destroyed in 1483 during the Ottoman attacks. Two statues from the castle are preserved: a statue of John of Nepomuk at the Černe house near the bakery (until 1936 it was displayed on the outer wall of the Dežman house in Zadvor), and a statue of John the Baptist held by the Ljubljana City Museum (before the Second World War it was in the roadside chapel-shrine on Codelli Street, Kodeljeva). On 8 August 1937 a large labor fair was held in Dobrunje on St. Ulrich’s Hill, organized by the Yugoslav Professional Association (Slovene: Jugoslovanska strokovna zveza, JSZ). It was attended by over 2,000 people.

=== Second World War ===
In 1942 two men from Bizovik (Franc Jakoš and Janez Pavčič) and three from Dobrunje (Milko Cankar, Franc Jakoš Sr., and Franc Jakoš Jr.) were abducted and killed by the Partisans. They were referred to in the extensive press coverage as the "Bizovik victims" (Slovene: bizoviške žrtve) and the "Dobrunje victims" (Slovene: dobrunjske žrtve). Their bodies were discovered on 20 March 1943 and they were buried at the Bizovik and Dobrunje cemeteries in ceremonies attended by several thousand people.

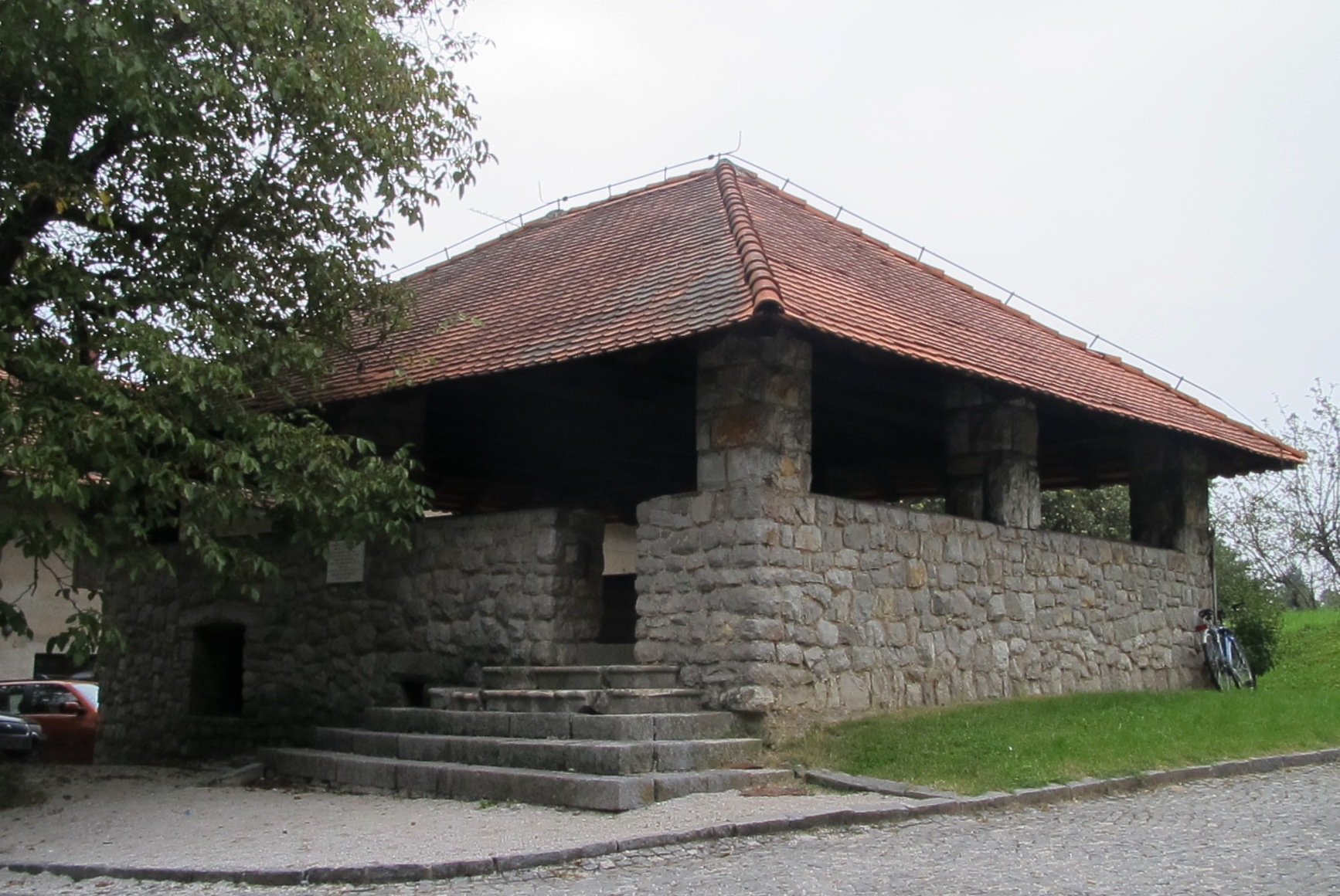
Former rectory

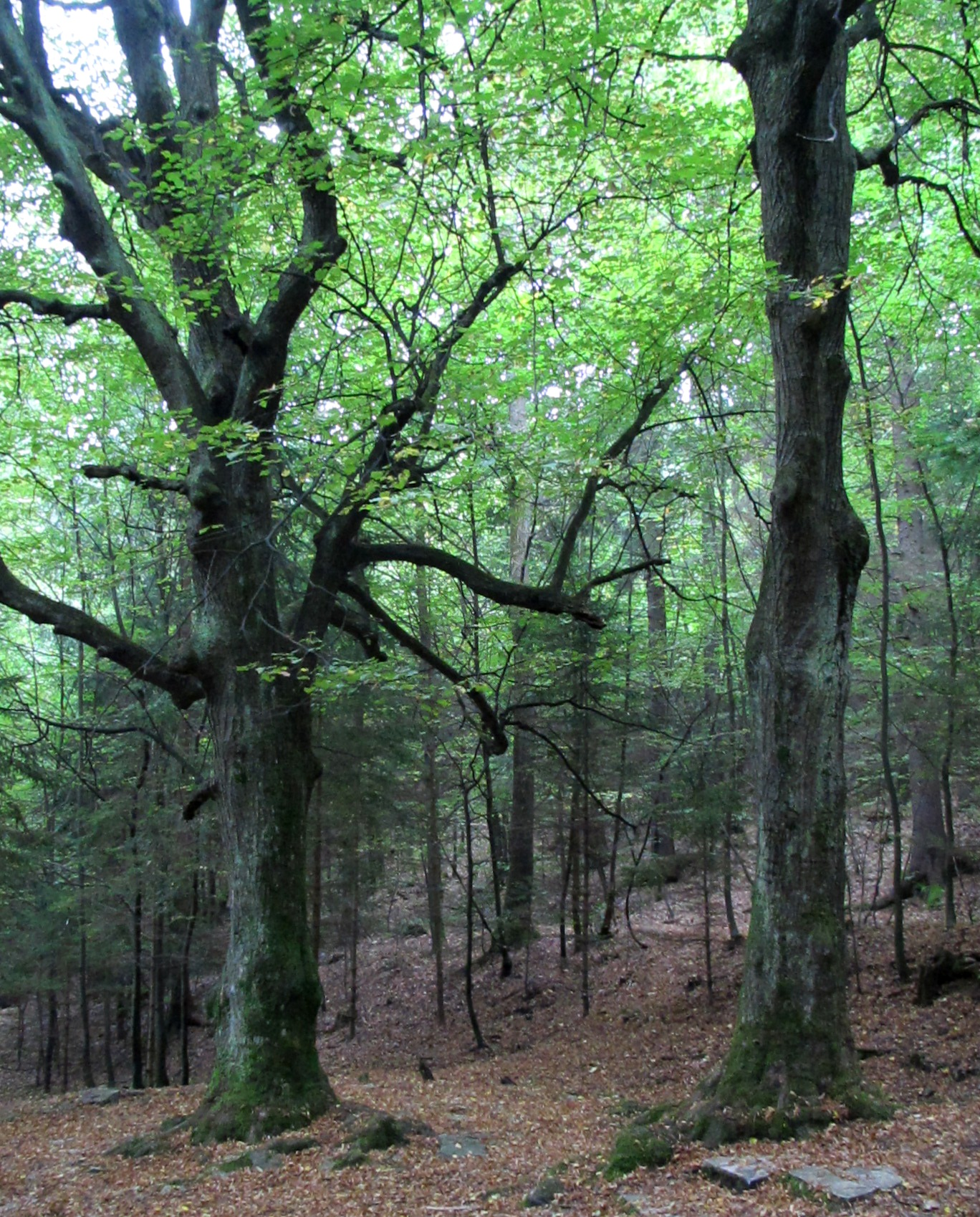
Beech trees

Memorial site

During the Second World War, an MVAC post was located at St. Ulrich's Church above Dobrunje. MVAC forces allegedly killed 123 people at the site, using the rectory basement to torture their victims. Soon after the war, reports about murders at St. Ulrich's started to appear in leftist emigrant newspapers such as Enakopravnost, with some claiming that over 700, 1,000, or even 1,500 people had been killed there. Local people were forced to disinter bodies for three weeks and bury them in a mass grave. A memorial by the architect Boris Kobe and the sculptors Karel Putrih and Zdenko Kalin was designed between 1948 and 1951, and was installed at the site in 1955. The mass grave memorial officially contains the remains of 123 victims of the MVAC forces, 36 members of the fourth battalion of the Partisan Cankar Brigade killed in an attack on 18 September 1943, and the poet, playwright, and Partisan soldier Jože Moškrič (1902–1943). The memorial complex also includes two beech trees in the forest south of the church where it is alleged that victims were shot.

After the fall of communism and Slovene independence, local people started openly calling into question the official version of events at St. Ulrich's. Claims were made that many of the bodies at the site were actually people liquidated by the Partisans during or after the war, including the "Šentpavel victims" (Slovene: šentpavelske žrtve)—eight men abducted by Yugoslav military police (KNOJ) from the village of Šentpavel on 4 July 1945 and murdered. It was also suggested that the political commissar Ivan Maček (1908–1993) manipulated the facts in order to create a major Partisan memorial conveniently located near Ljubljana.

=== Annexation ===
Dobrunje was annexed by the city of Ljubljana in 1982, ending its existence as an independent settlement.

== St. Ulrich's Church ==
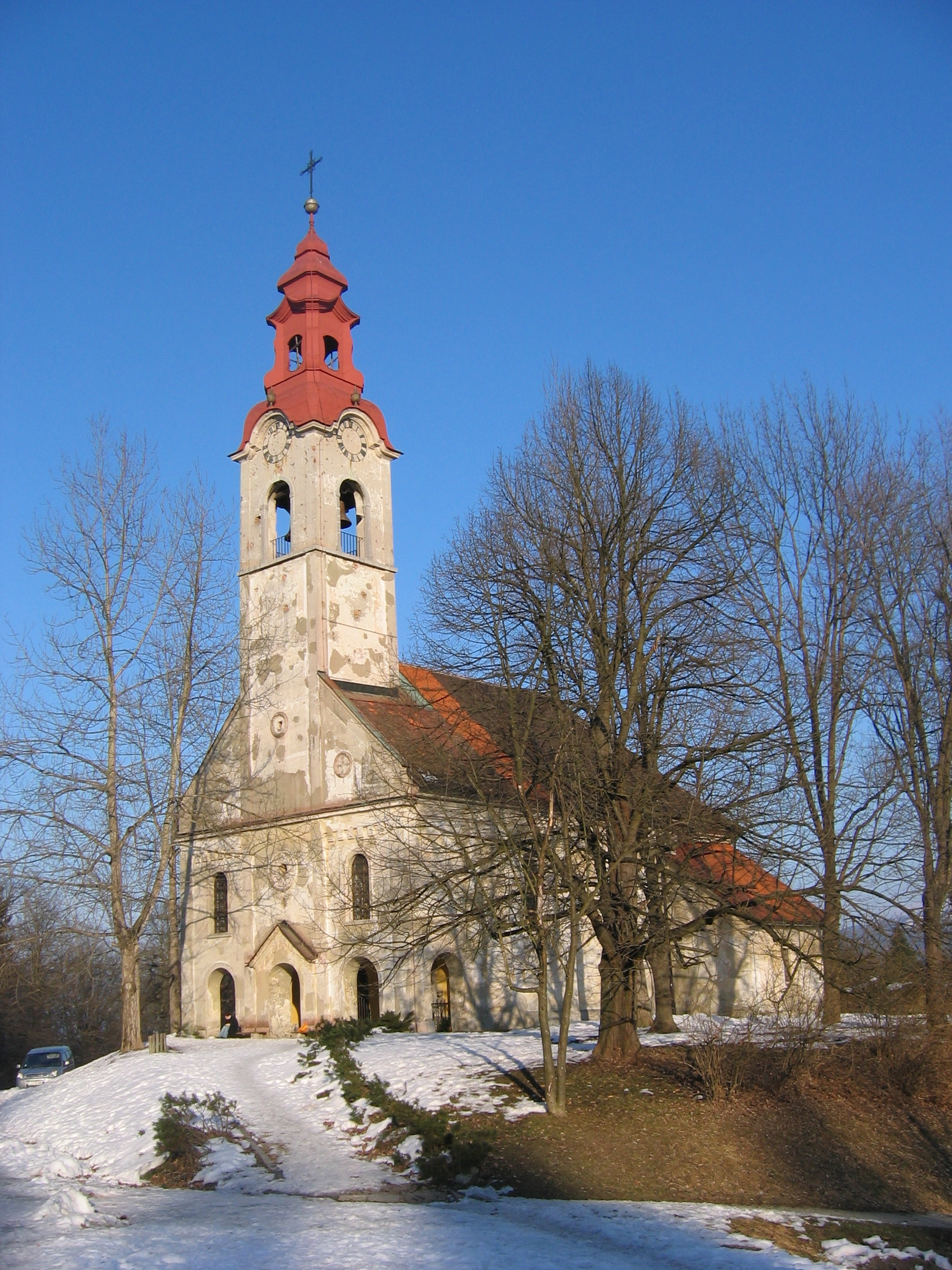
Before 2006

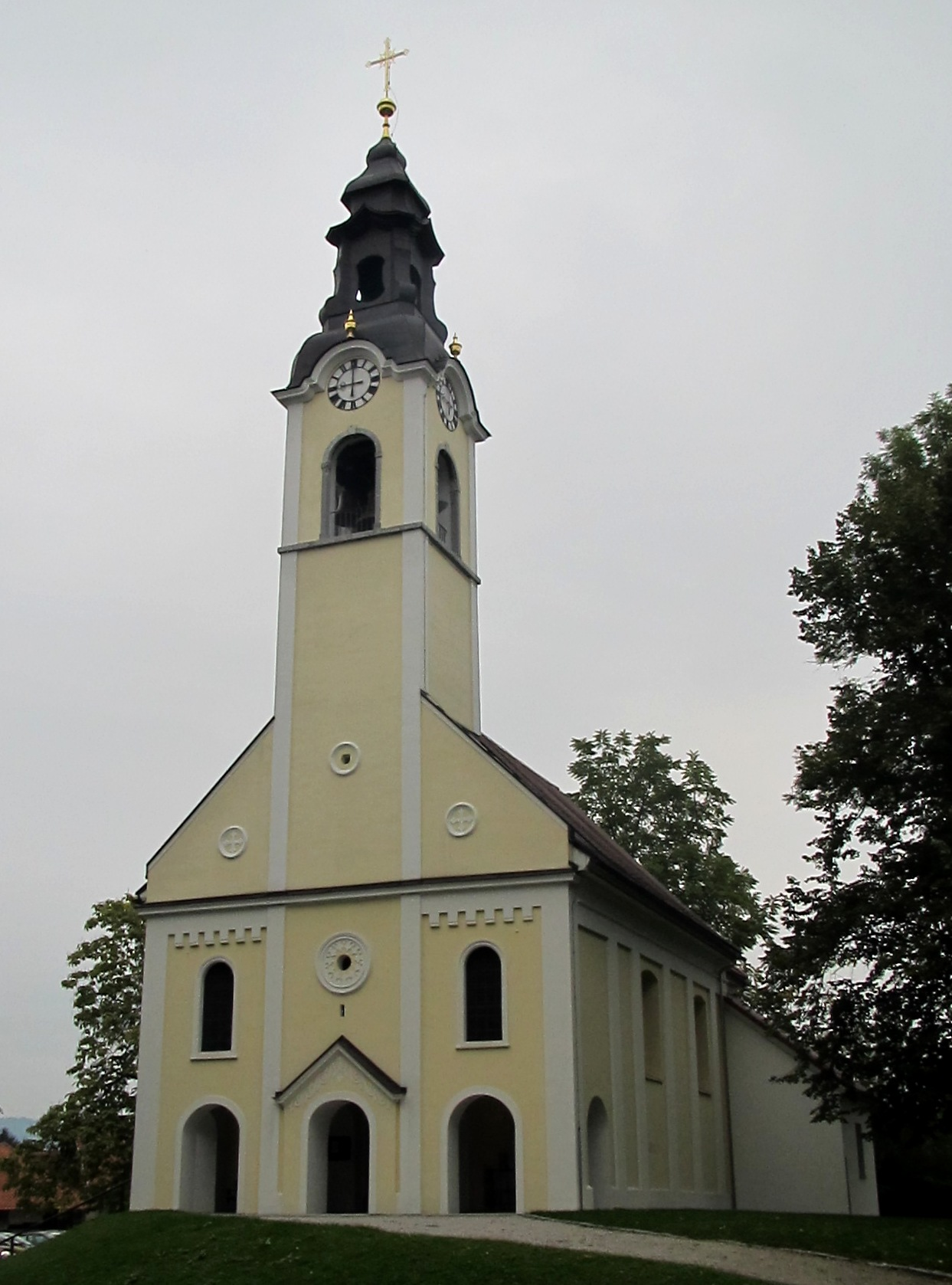
After 2006

St. Ulrich's Church

In the past, a pilgrimage route led to the hill where St. Ulrich’s church is located. The pilgrims prayed for intercession against malaria. A church already stood at the location in the Middle Ages. The current church was built by the Counts of Codelli, who also granted part of the forest to the church. A Latin inscription at the church states that it was dedicated by Ljubljana Bishop Felix Schrattenbach on 11 October 1741. Until 1788 a branch of the Stična monastery was also located at the site. The church was the seat of an independent parish until 1810, comprising the villages of Dobrunje, Podmolnik, and Zadvor. In 1810 it became part of the Parish of Sostro. There is a plaque commemorating the fallen of the First World War to the right of the entrance to the church. The plaque was created by the stone cutter Ivan Irt from Štepanja Vas. A ceremony at the church to unveil the plaque was announced for 25 April 1926 and the date 25 April 1926 appears on the stone.

As part of the process of creating the Second World War memorial, St. Ulrich's Church was nationalized on 7 May 1947 as a Second World War monument. The church was purposefully left in disrepair, showing damage from the war. After Slovene independence, demands were made to denationalize St. Ulrich's Church and return it to the parish. The keys to the church were ceremonially handed over to Father Mirko Pihler on 9 June 1994, returning the building to the Parish of Sostro. Work to repair the exterior of the church began in 2006.

== Cemetery ==
The cemetery at Dobrunje was often used to bury drowning victims from the Ljubljanica River, whose bodies were frequently pulled out by local fishermen or washed ashore at Vevče. The cemetery was destroyed after the Second World War in order to create the monument at the site. Although it was characterized at the time as abandoned, it had still been actively used during the Second World War by the local population.

== Notable people ==
Notable people that were born or lived in Dobrunje include:

- Anton Anžič (1891–1965), writer and translator
- Fran Lipah (1892–1952), actor, director, playwright, and writer
- Franc Lokar (1890–?), writer
- Silvester Mure (1743–1810), priest and playwright

== Gallery ==
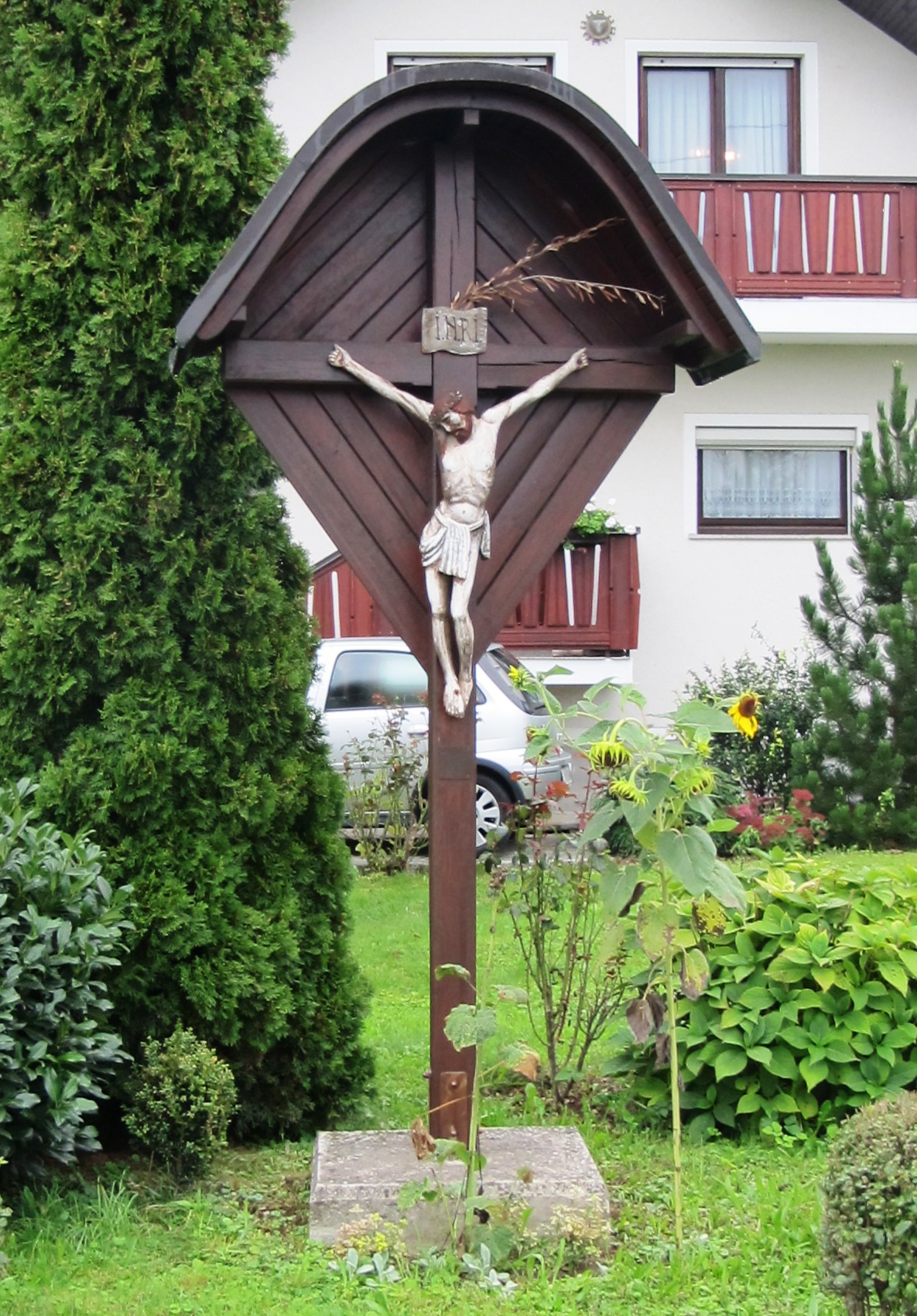
Roadside crucifix

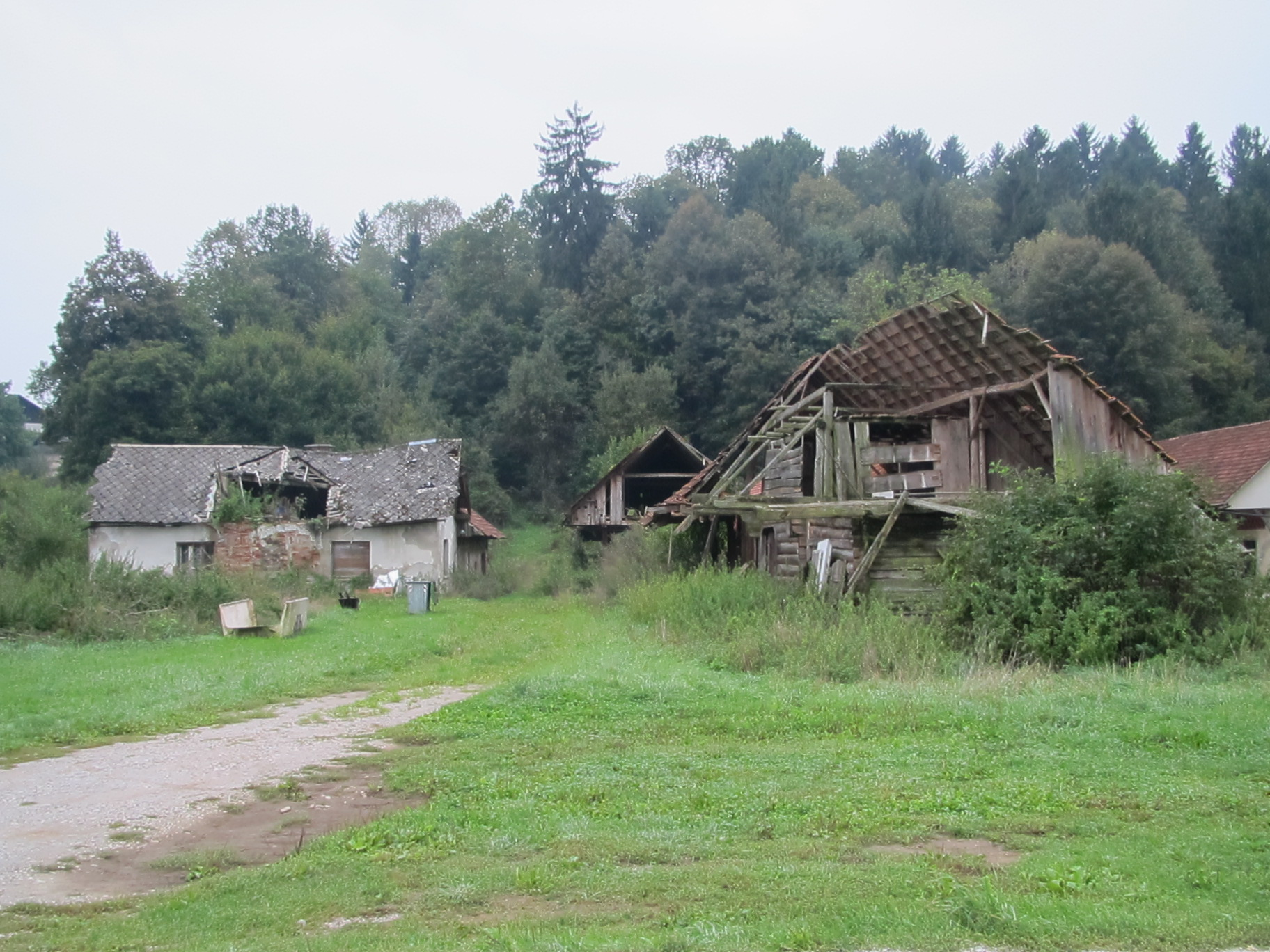
Abandoned farm

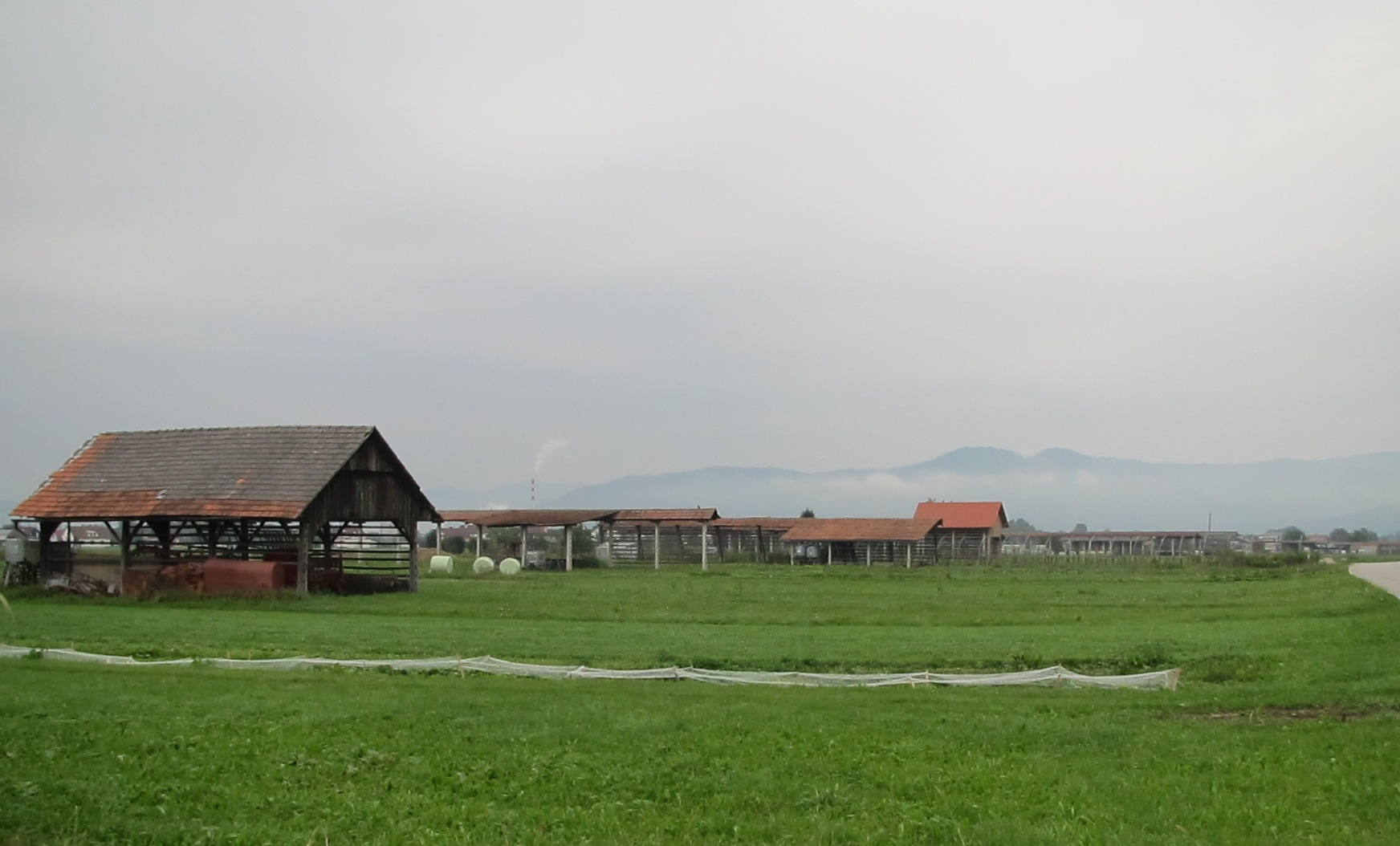
Farmland

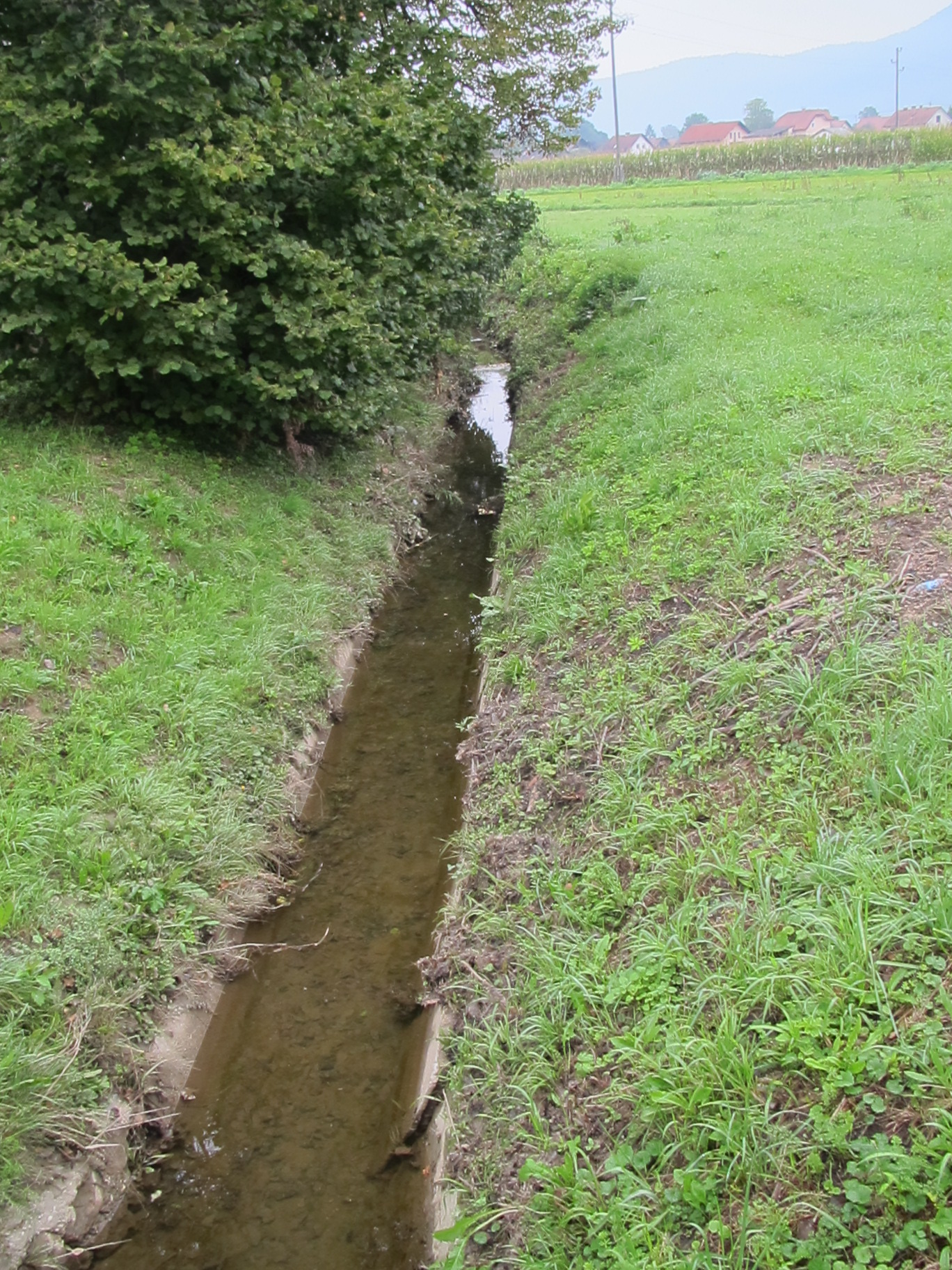
Rastučnik Creek
