= Kravjek Castle =

Ruined castle in Lower Carniola, Slovenia

Coordinates: 45°54′51.09″N 14°46′44.57″E

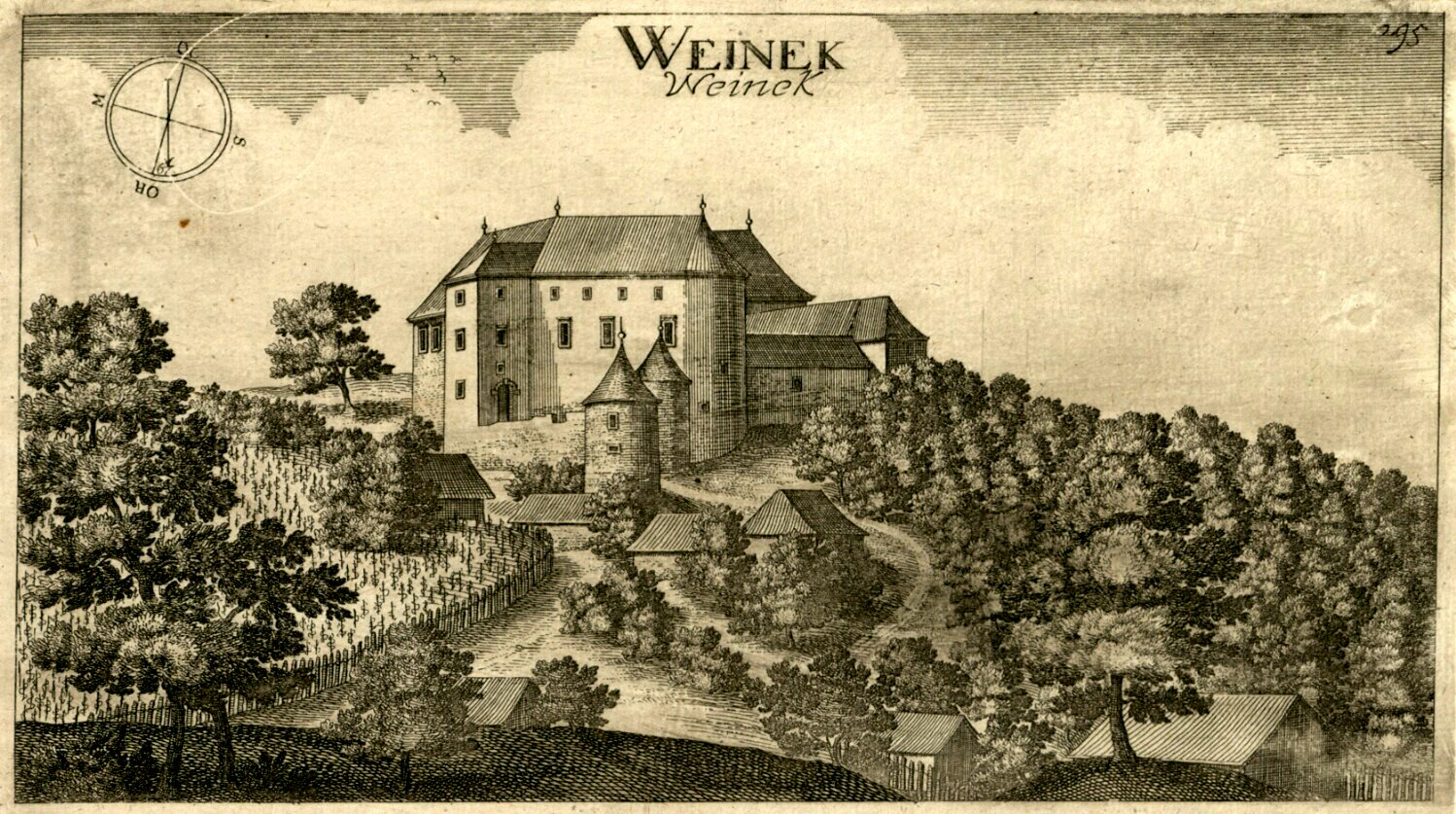
Kravjek Castle on a Valvasor's engraving from 1679

Kravjek Castle (Slovene: Grad Kravjek, German: Schloss Weineck) is a ruined castle northwest of Muljava, in Lower Carniola, Slovenia.

== History ==
Kravjek was once one of the more important castles of the Duchy of Carinthia. Its first owners were the Dukes of Spanheim, who managed the castle via their ministeriales. This practice resulted in the castle's first indirect mention in a 1243 record of a legal proceeding, in which a "Friderik castellanus de Weinek" was called as a witness. The castle was next indirectly mentioned in written sources in 1254, when its castellan Rajnboto of Jetrbenšek, ministerialis of Duke Ulrik III, donated two farms and two vineyards to Stična Abbey.

The first direct record of the castle dates from 1256, in an agreement signed by the brothers Ulrik and Phillip of Salzburg, dividing their inheritance. Ulrik received Ljubljana Castle and Kostanjevica Castle, and Phillip took possession of the Carinthian castles at Himmelberg and Wernberg, as well as the castles at Sostro and Kravjek.

Phillip sold Kravjek in 1279 to the Patriarchate of Aquileia. It remained a personal fief of the Dukes of Carinthia until 1335, when it passed among the holdings of the duchy itself.

== Sources ==
- Ivan Stopar, Grajske stavbe v osrednji Sloveniji, II. Dolenjska, book III, Porečje Temenice in Mirne, Viharnik, Ljubljana 2002 ISBN 961-6057-34-0
