= Cven, Ljutomer =

Cven
- Location in Slovenia
- Coordinates: 46°32′41.5″N 16°13′0.19″E
- Country: Slovenia
- Traditional region: Styria
- Statistical region: Mura
- Municipality: Ljutomer

Area
  - Total: 5.88 km^{2} (2.27 sq mi)
- Elevation: 175.5 m (576 ft)

Population (2016)
  - Total: 569

Cven (pronounced [ˈtsʋeːn], German: Zween) is a village in the Municipality of Ljutomer in eastern Slovenia. The area is part of the traditional region of Styria and is now included in the Mura Statistical Region.

== Name ==
Cven was attested in written sources in 1445 as Wyenn and circa 1500 as Wienn. The Slovene name Cven is borrowed from the Middle High German prepositional phrase ze Wienn, literally 'at Wienn'. The name Wienn refers to a manor built in the 14th century by a military commander named Aman. It may be derived from the Middle High German noun win 'acquisition'. For similar Slovene geographical names based on foreign-language prepositional phrases of location, compare Cmurek, Crngrob, Dragonja, Sostro, and Spuhlja.

== History ==
Potsherds and human remains from antiquity have been found in the settlement, testifying to early settlement in the area. The village was sacked during a peasant uprising in 1704, and the castle was also burned and never rebuilt. Cven Castle was surrounded by a meander in the Murica River on three sides and protected by a moat on the fourth side. Cven was known for horse breeding from the mid-19th century until the Second World War. Horse races were held as early as 1850 along the road from Ljutomer to Križevci pri Ljutomeru, and a horse racing society was established in 1875, which also set up a racetrack in Cven. A school was established in the village in 1879, and a fire station was built in 1892.

== Cultural heritage ==
There is a small chapel with a belfry in the centre of the village. It is dedicated to Saint Joseph and was built in 1867.

== Notable people ==
Notable people that were born or lived in Cven include:

- Jakob Babič (1909–1941), political activist
- Aleksander Dimitrijev (ca. 1868–1942), Russian colonel, horse-breeding specialist, and technical writer
- Avgust Loparnik (1911–?), musician
- Stanko Pušenjak (1895–1965), healthcare worker
- Tomaž Pušenjak (1861–1920), beekeeper and agricultural specialist
- Vekoslav Raič (1844–1929), social activist
- Ivan Rajh (1842–1908), politician
- Janez Reich (1857–1938), education specialist
- Franc Seršen (1850–1916), social activist
- Peter Skuhala (1850–1916), poet, storyteller, and journalist
- Franc Vozlič (1853–1915), folklore specialist
