= Sostro =

- Location in Slovenia
- Coordinates: 46°2′10.25″N 14°36′25.07″E
- Country: Slovenia
- Traditional region: Lower Carniola
- Statistical region: Central Slovenia
- Municipality: Ljubljana
- Elevation: 283 m (928 ft)

Sostro (pronounced [ˈsoːstɾɔ]; German: Sostru) is a formerly independent settlement in the eastern part of the capital Ljubljana in central Slovenia. It is part of the traditional region of Lower Carniola and is now included with the rest of the municipality in the Central Slovenia Statistical Region. In addition to the main settlement, Sostro includes the hamlet of Betežica, located to the northeast along Betežčica Creek, and the hamlet of Glastavci in the wooded hills above Betežica. Sostro is also the source of the name of the Sostro District (Slovene: Četrtna skupnost Sostro), the largest district of the capital.

== Name ==
Sostro was first attested in written sources as Czozter in 1353 (and as Zozter in 1356, and ze Oster and Soster in 1342). The medieval attestations indicate that the name was originally *Coster, with later assimilation of C–s– to S–s–. *Coster is presumably derived from Middle High German ze Ôster 'at the east', likely referring to the nearby castle at Osterberg (literally, 'east mountain'; Slovene: Ostri vrh) above Podgrad. Osterberg Castle was the first castle east of Ljubljana, built in the 13th century. Sostro thus means 'at the place to the east'. Locally, Sostro is known as Sostr and in the past the German name was Sostru. For similar Slovene geographical names based on foreign-language prepositional phrases of location, compare Cmurek, Crngrob, Cven, Dragonja, and Spuhlja.

== History ==
Roman urn graves have been found in the woods behind the church in Sostro, testifying to early settlement of the area. Schooling was begun in Sostro in 1869, when the first schoolhouse was built. A new school building was built in 1913. During the Second World War, Italian forces executed hostages below Dimnik Hill (Slovene: Dimnikov hrib) behind the village. This is commemorated by a plaque. Sostro was annexed by the City of Ljubljana in 1982, ending its existence as an independent settlement.

== Church ==
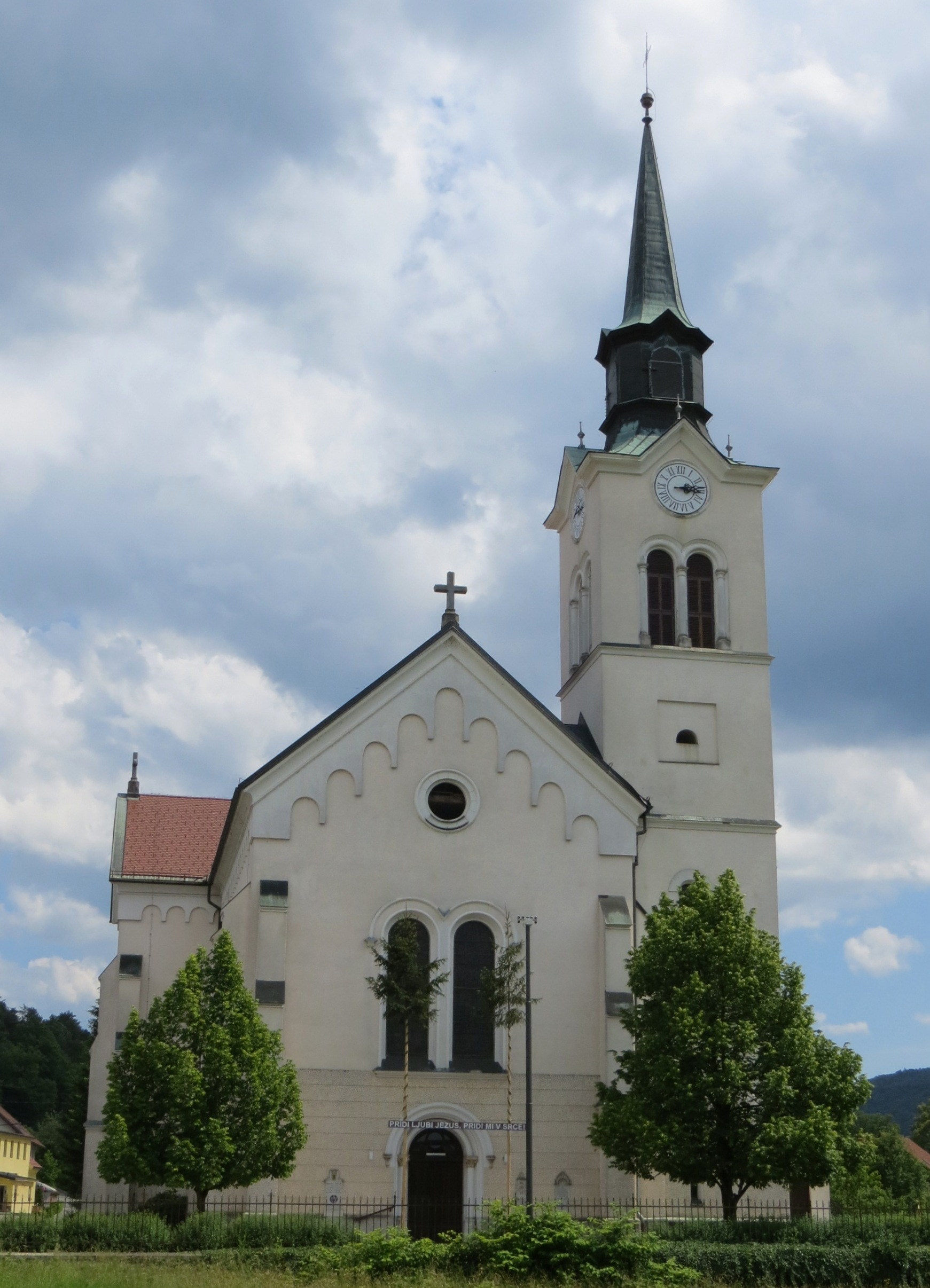
Saint Leonard's Church

A church dedicated to Saint Leonard (Slovene: sveti Lenart) was mentioned in written sources as early as the 14th century. The old church was razed after it was damaged in the earthquake of 1895, and a new church was built slightly further south in 1898 in a pseudo-Romanesque style. Furnishings preserved from the old church include a 1750 painting of Saint Elizabeth by Valentin Metzinger (1699–1759), a painting of Saint Florian by Josip Egartner, and a painting of Saint Leonard by Janez Wolf (1825–1884). Stained glass windows designed by Stane Kregar (1905–1973) were installed in 1968. Sostro was made a vicariate in 1753 and later elevated to a parish.
