= Zadvor =

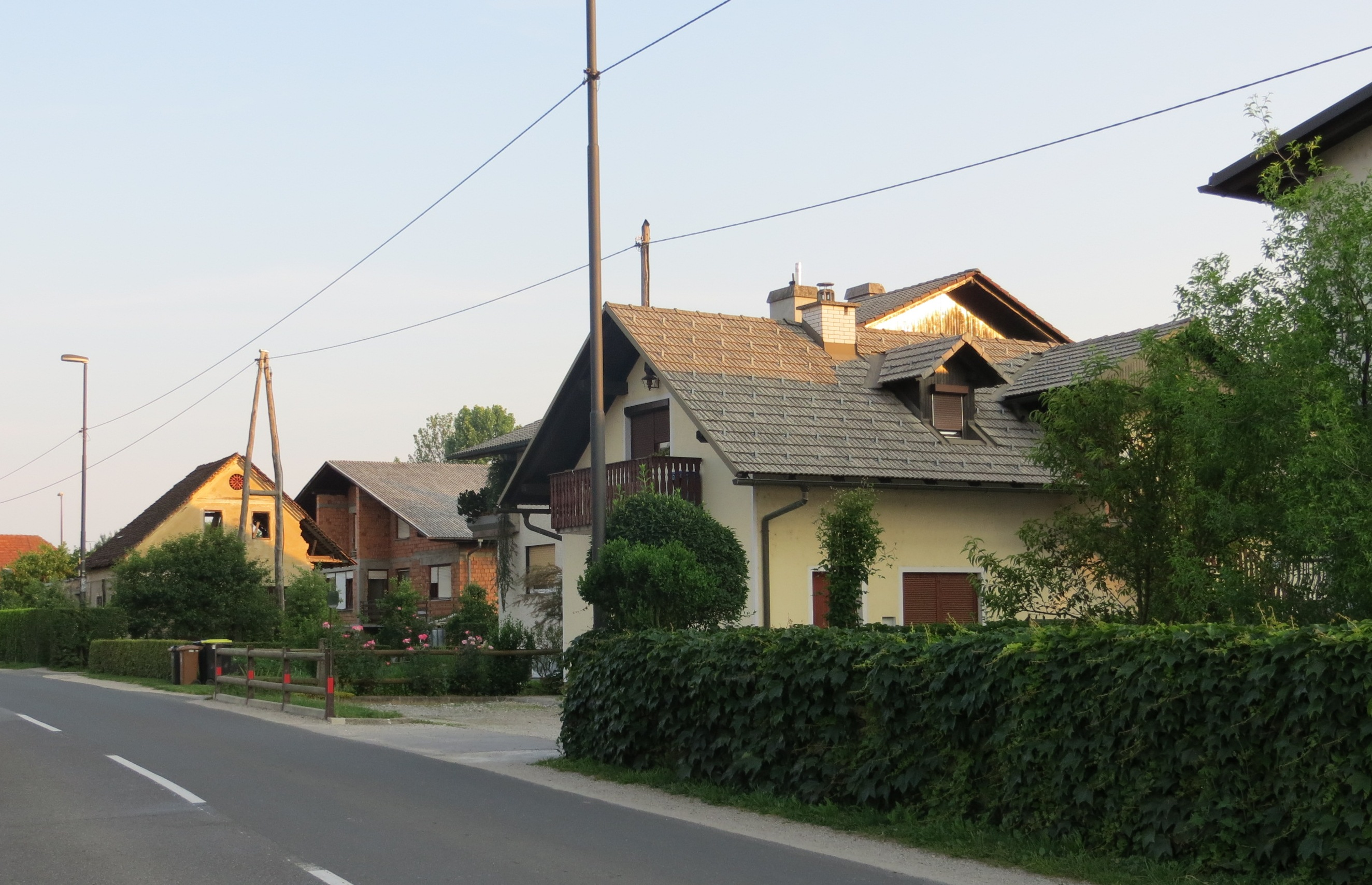

- Location in Slovenia
- Coordinates: 46°2′8.49″N 14°35′50.36″E
- Country: Slovenia
- Traditional region: Lower Carniola
- Statistical region: Central Slovenia
- Municipality: Ljubljana
- Elevation: 280 m (920 ft)

Zadvor (pronounced [zaˈdʋɔɾ]; German: Saduor) is a formerly independent settlement in the southeast part of the capital Ljubljana in central Slovenia. It belongs to the City Municipality of Ljubljana. It is part of the traditional region of Lower Carniola and is now included with the rest of the municipality in the Central Slovenia Statistical Region. In addition to the main settlement, Zadvor consists of the hamlets of Križavka (also known as Križanke) to the southeast, near Saint Leonard's Church in Sostro, Žabja Vas (Slovene: Žabja vas) to the south below Zadvor Hill (Slovene: Zadvorski hrib), and Cegelnica next to that. In Žabja Vas there are two ponds in pits that were dug for the former brickworks at Cegelnica.

== Name ==
The name Zadvor is a fused prepositional phrase that has lost its case inflection, from za 'behind' + dvor 'manor'. The name thus literally means 'behind the manor'. The word dvor is a relatively common toponym element in Slovenia and, in addition to 'manor', may also refer to a farm with outbuildings, an estate, a (fenced-in) courtyard, or a barnyard, as well as a medieval agricultural estate comprising up to 40 farms. In this case, the name refers to a property owned by lesser nobility in the 11th and 12th centuries. The estate was later divided among the family members, who pursued farming. The settlement was known as Saduor in German.

== Annexation ==
Zadvor was annexed by the city of Ljubljana in 1982, ending its existence as an independent settlement.

== Notable people ==
Notable people that were born or lived in Zadvor include:

- Jože Moškrič a.k.a. "Ciril" (1902–1943), a Slovenian Partisan, proclaimed a People's Hero of Yugoslavia
- Tone Trtnik (1908–1942), a Slovenian Partisan, proclaimed a People's Hero of Yugoslavia

== Gallery ==
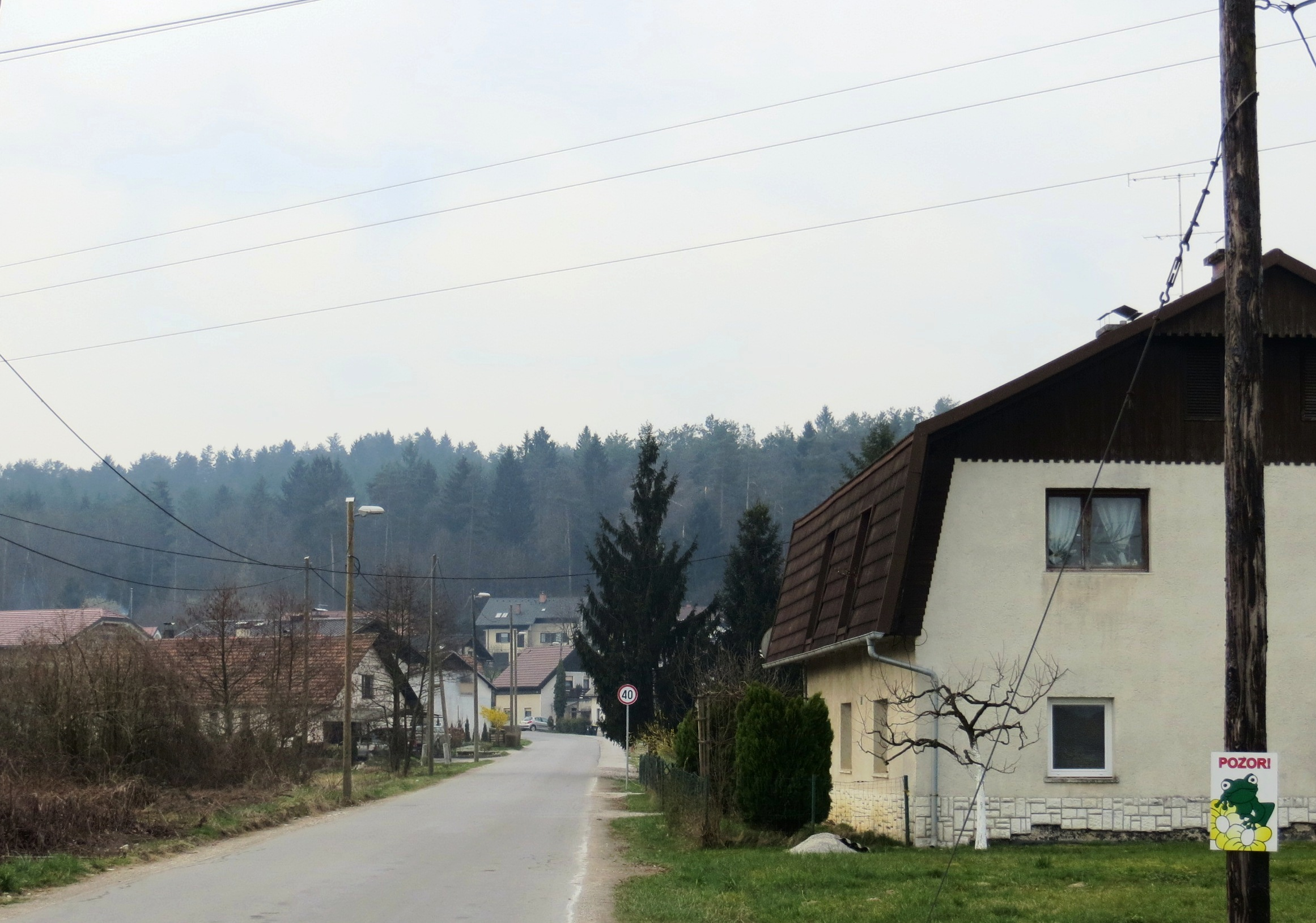
The hamlet of Žabja Vas
