= Zavoglje =

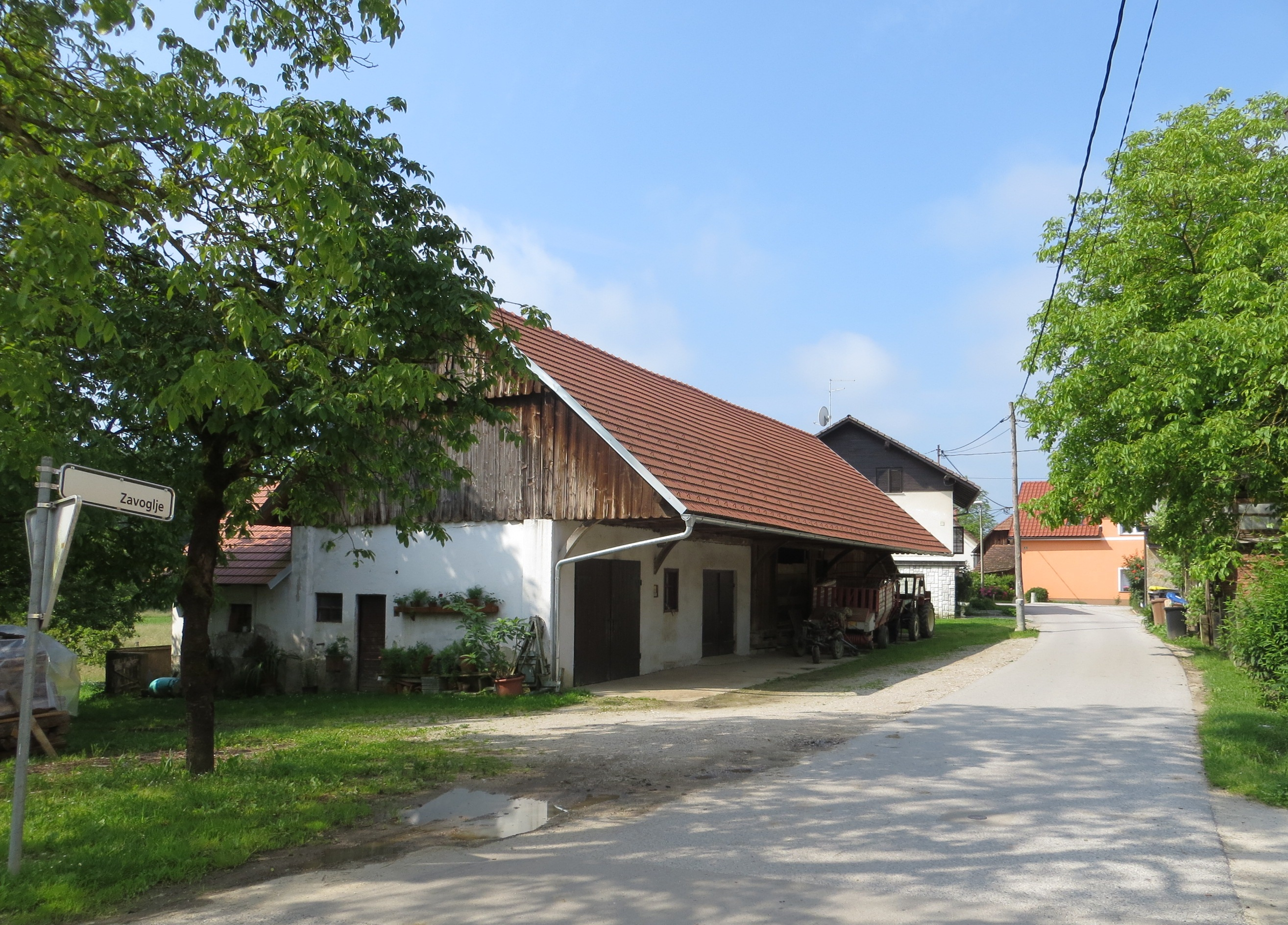

- Location in Slovenia
- Coordinates: 46°2′36.07″N 14°36′33.60″E
- Country: Slovenia
- Traditional region: Lower Carniola
- Statistical region: Central Slovenia
- Municipality: Ljubljana
- Elevation: 277 m (909 ft)

Zavoglje (pronounced [zaˈʋoːɡljɛ]) is a formerly independent settlement in the eastern part of the capital Ljubljana in central Slovenia. It lies at the confluence of the Ljubljanica River with Dobrunjščica Creek. It is part of the traditional region of Lower Carniola and is now included with the rest of the municipality in the Central Slovenia Statistical Region. In addition to the main settlement, Zavoglje includes the hamlet of Mrakovce.

== Name ==
Zavoglje was attested in historical sources as sanctum Vdalricum in 1249, sanctum Vlricum in 1350, and sand Ulrich in 1401, all names referring to the church in the village.

== History ==
In the mid-12th century, Zavoglje belonged to the Counts of Spanheim. It is said that a fortified defensive encampment stood at the Jožefuc house (Slovene: pri Jožefucu) during the Ottoman wars in Europe. Some ornamentation and stone from the camp was later incorporated into the walls of the local church. The Jurjevec house next to the church was formerly a castle manor farm. Zavoglje was annexed by the City of Ljubljana in 1982, ending its existence as an independent settlement.

== Church ==
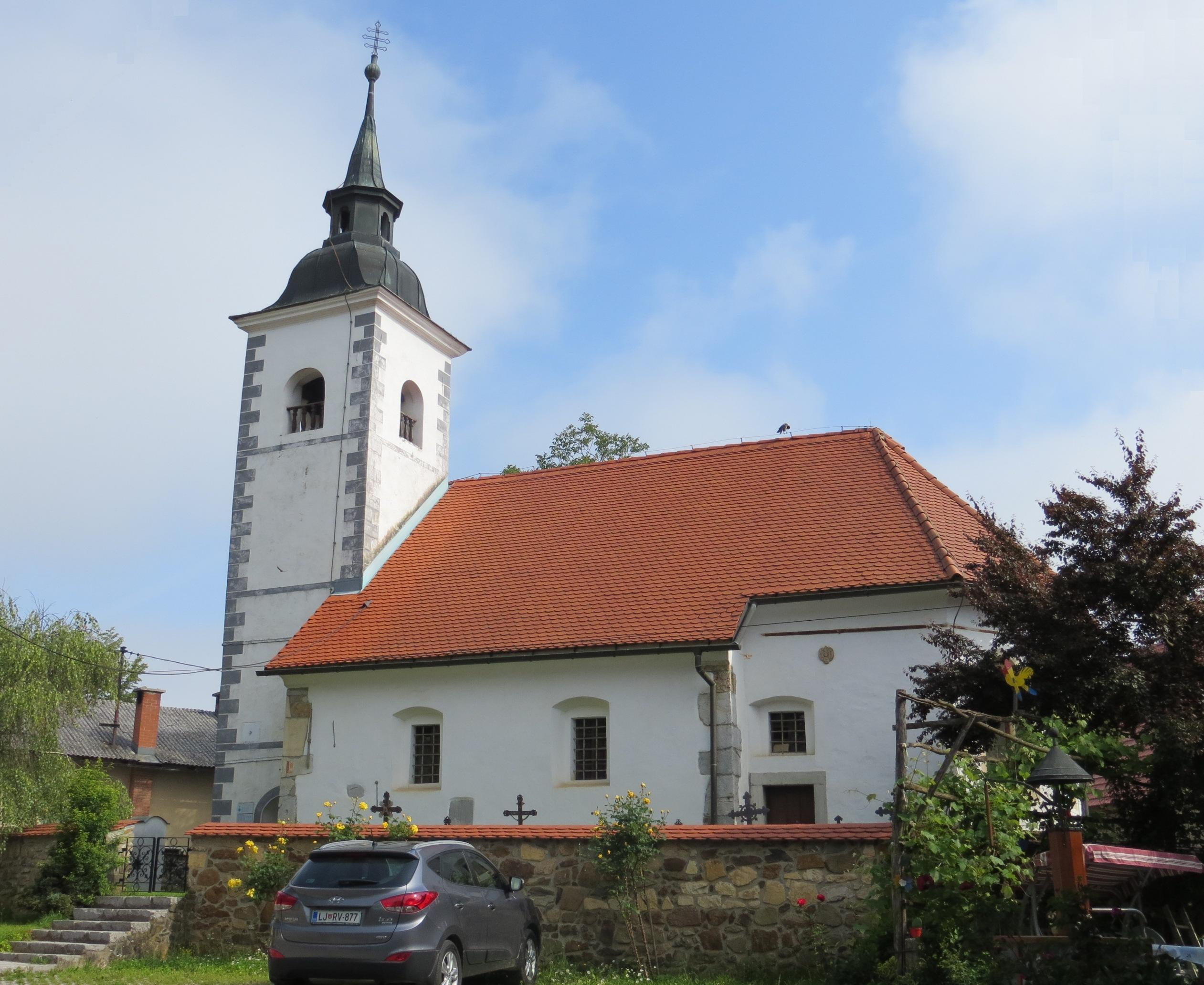
Saint Ulrich's Church

The church in Zavoglje is dedicated to Saint Ulrich (Slovene: sveti Urh). It is a Gothic structure that was burned during an Ottoman attack in 1529 and reconsecrated by Bishop Thomas Chrön (1560–1630) in 1604. The structure is actually a combination of two churches: a smaller one to the north and a larger one to the south, with the juncture marked by arches and piers. The smaller church was dedicated to Saint Mark, and the larger one to Saint Ulrich. The two chancels are Gothic rib vaulted; the northern chancel is now walled up on the nave side. The larger southern part of the church is richly decorated with stonework. The church was reworked in 1633, when the two structures were combined into one and a bell tower was added. Two Roman stones are embedded into the wall near the bell tower. On the north exterior wall there is a relief of four carved stone heads of various ages, arranged in a cross shape. On the west exterior wall there is a carving of a bearded man swimming with a child on his shoulders calling for help. It is said to have been carved to commemorate a child that drowned in the Ljubljanica River. There are traces of late Gothic frescoes on the exterior walls. The main altar is pseudo-Gothic and the side altars date from the 18th century. The church was badly damaged in the 1895 Ljubljana earthquake, at which point the nave in front of the altar dedicated to Saint Mark was given a flat roof. The cemetery surrounding the church contains a large number of cast-iron crosses erected in the 19th century.

A local legend relates that in the 16th century the church was used by Ottoman forces to stable horses. However, the sexton was able to sneak past the guards into the church and put wax on the horses' teeth, so that they refused to eat or drink the next morning. The Ottomans blamed the church's patron saint for punishing them, and removed the horses from the church. When the last horse left the church, it kicked at the door, leaving a hoof print, and an Ottoman soldier slashed at the door in anger with his saber. Both marks can still be seen today.

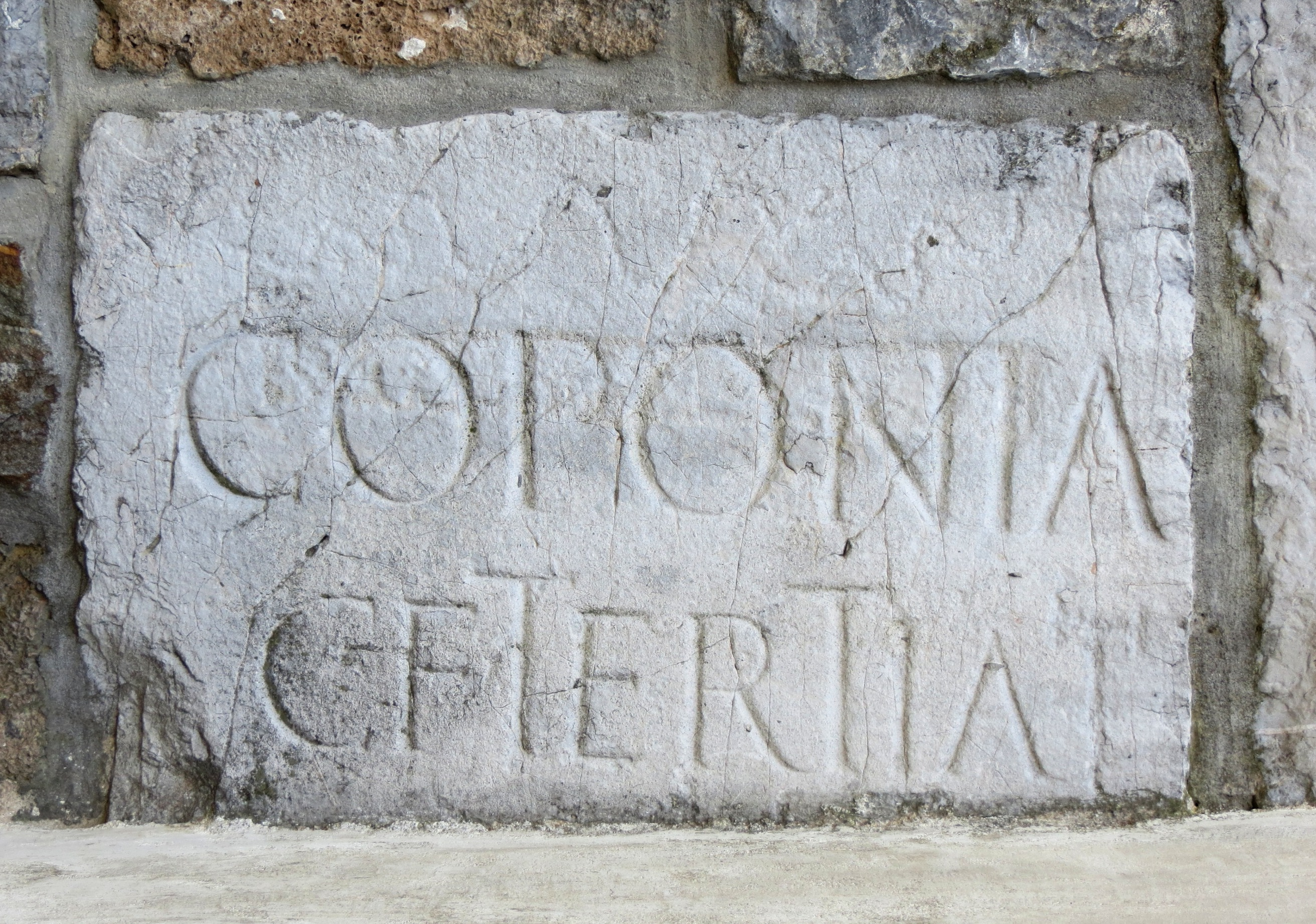
Roman stone in north church wall

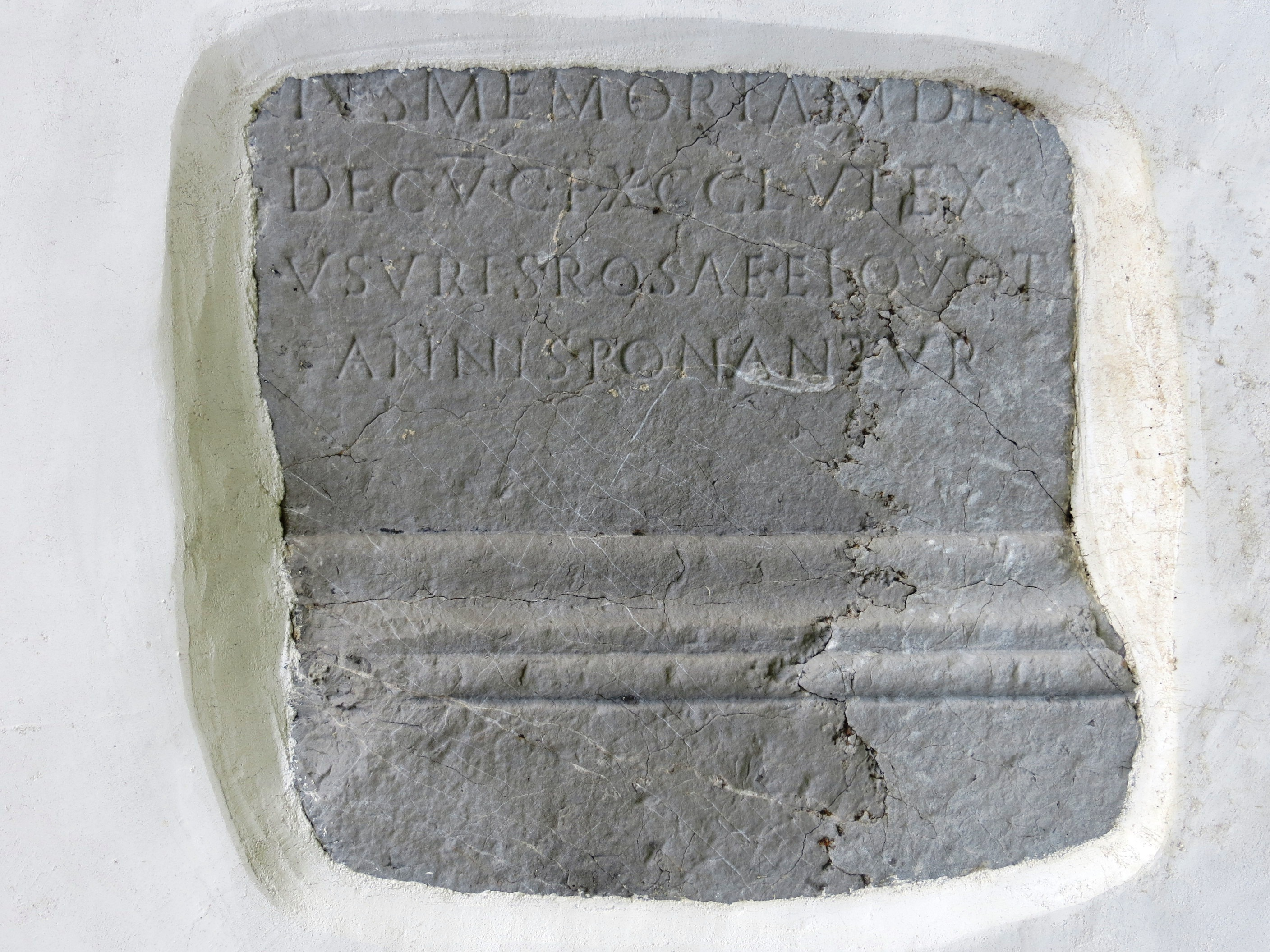
Roman stone in west church wall

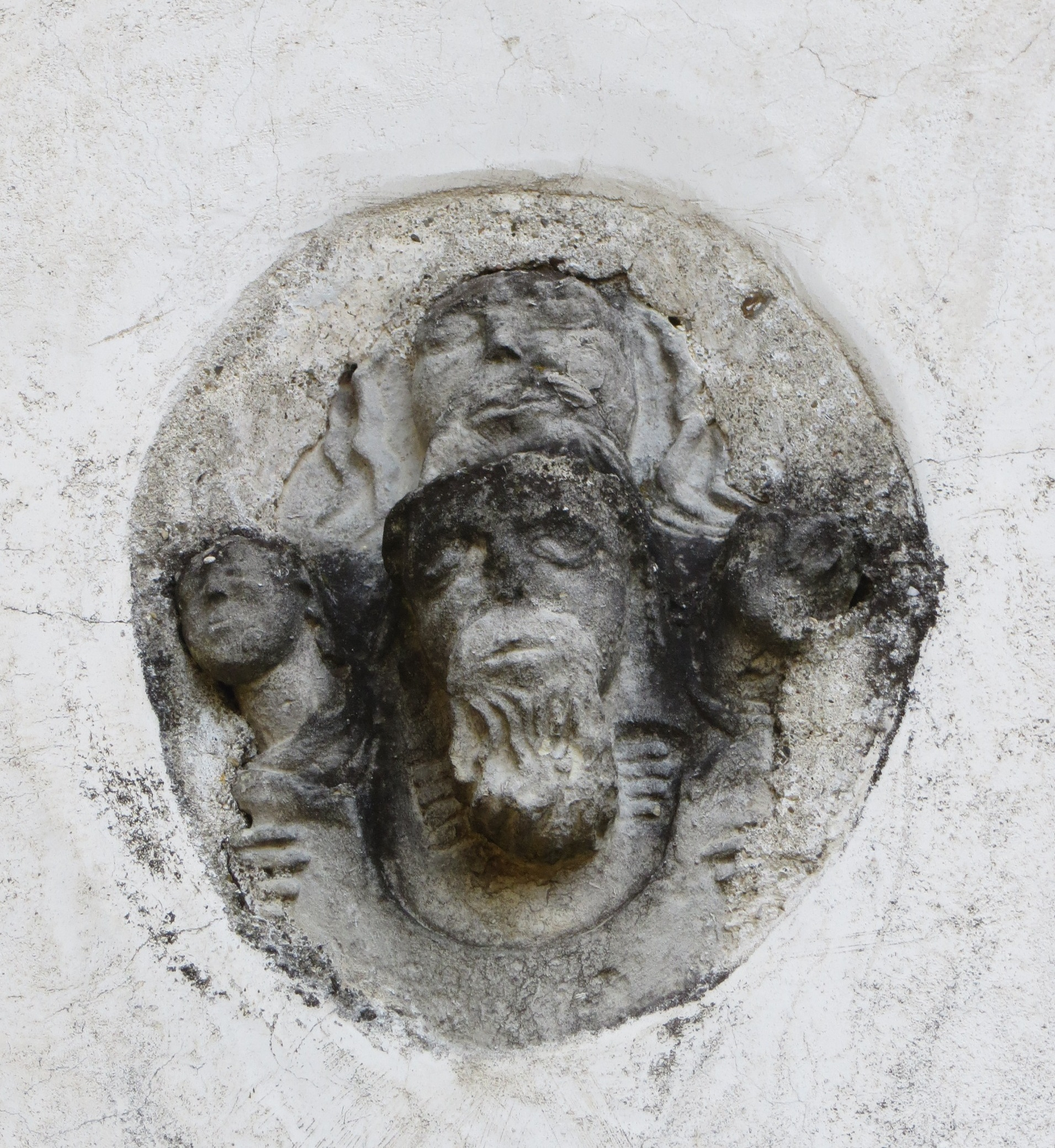
Carving on north church wall

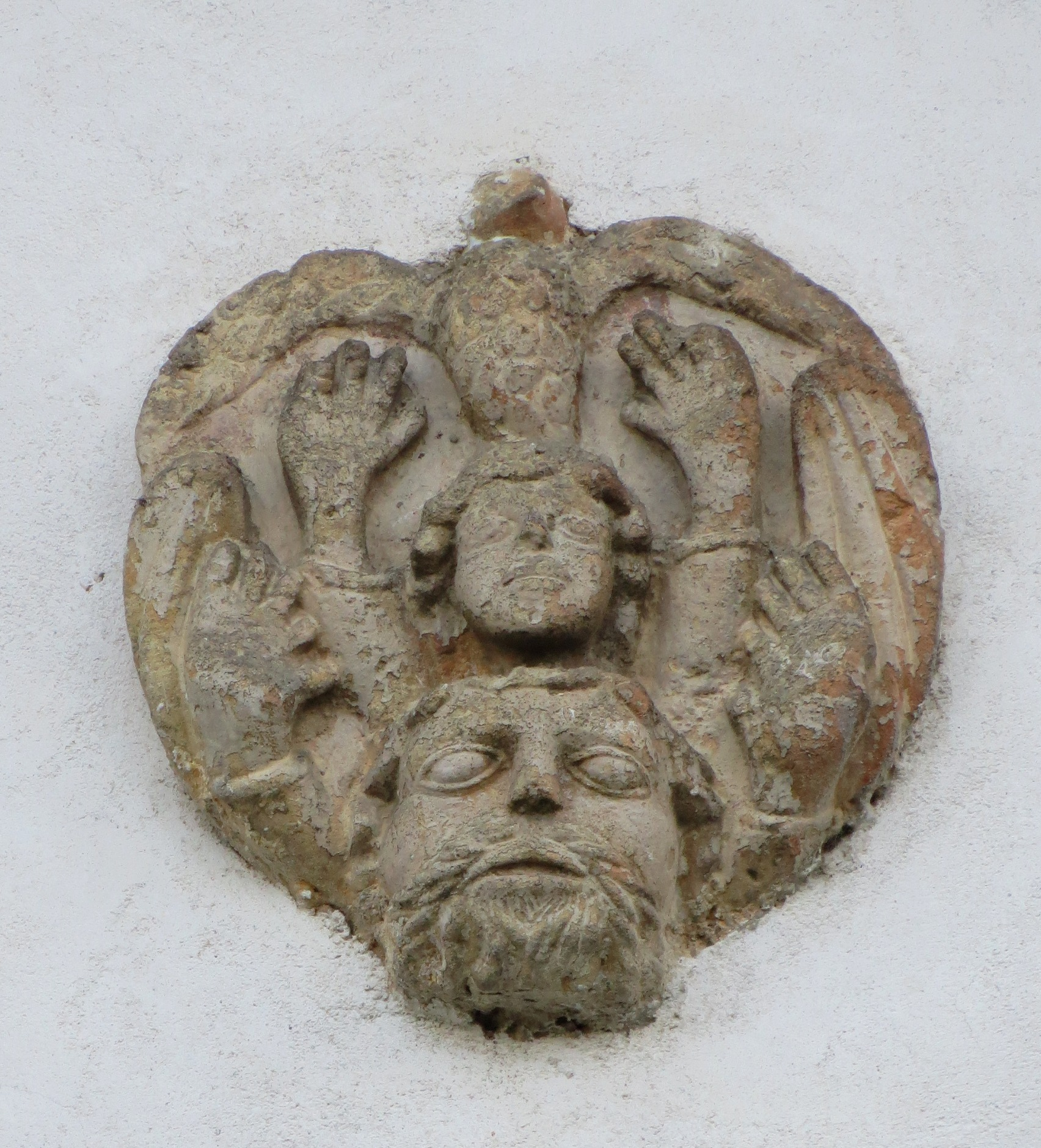
Carving on west church wall

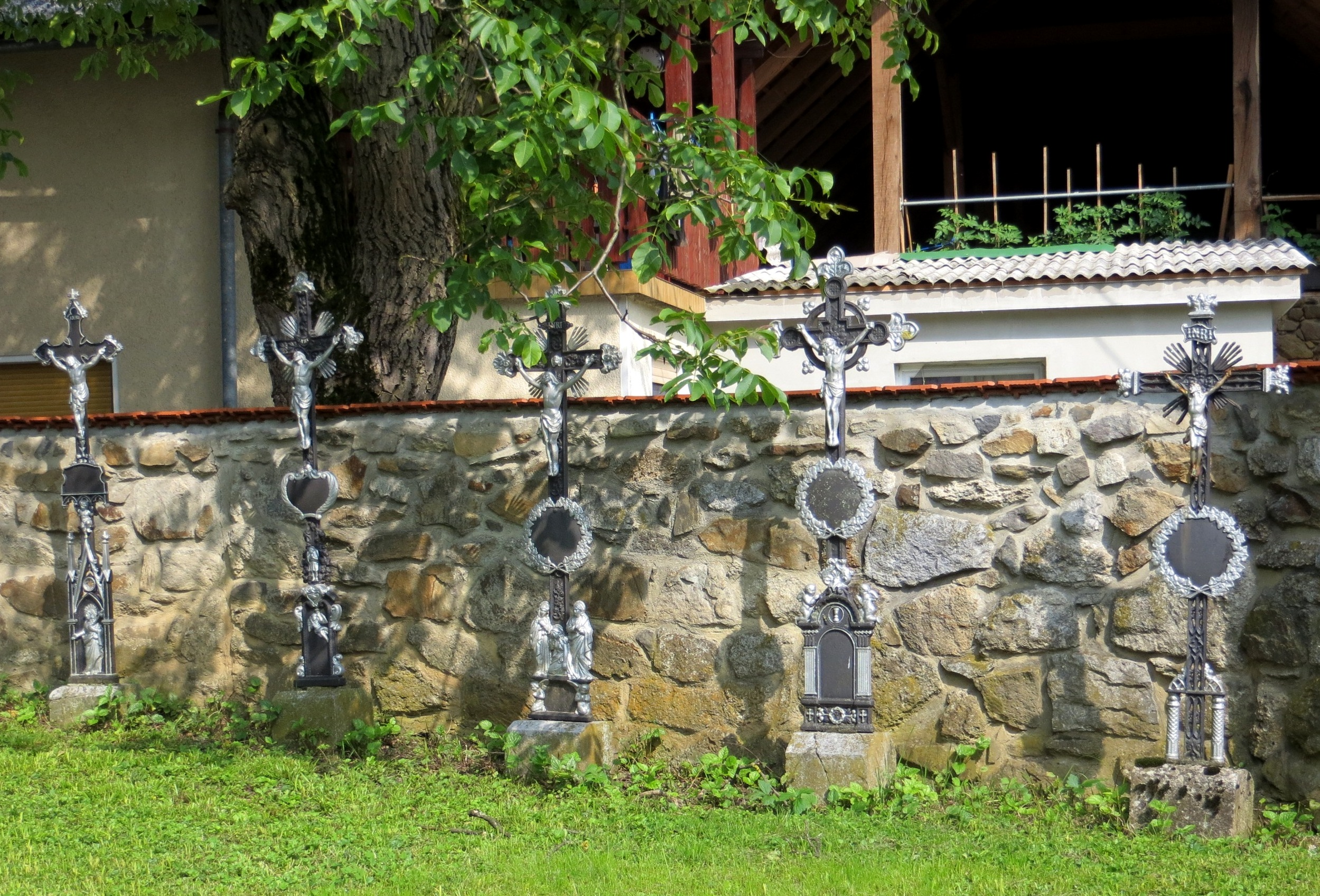
19th-century cast-iron crosses

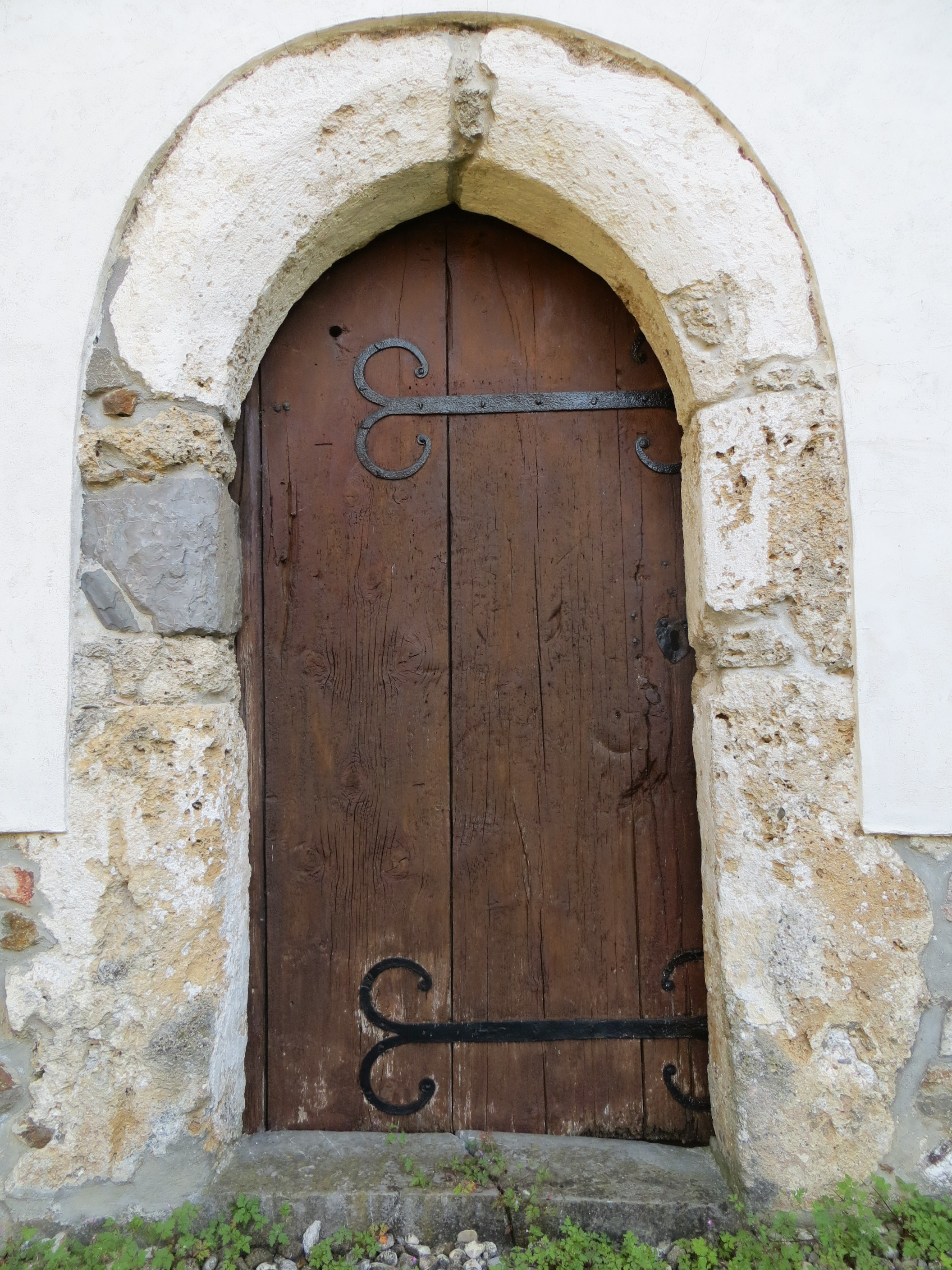
Church door with markings
