= Tommaso Solari =

Italian sculptor

Tommaso Solari (Naples, September 4, 1820 - 1889) was an Italian sculptor active in a Romantic-style.

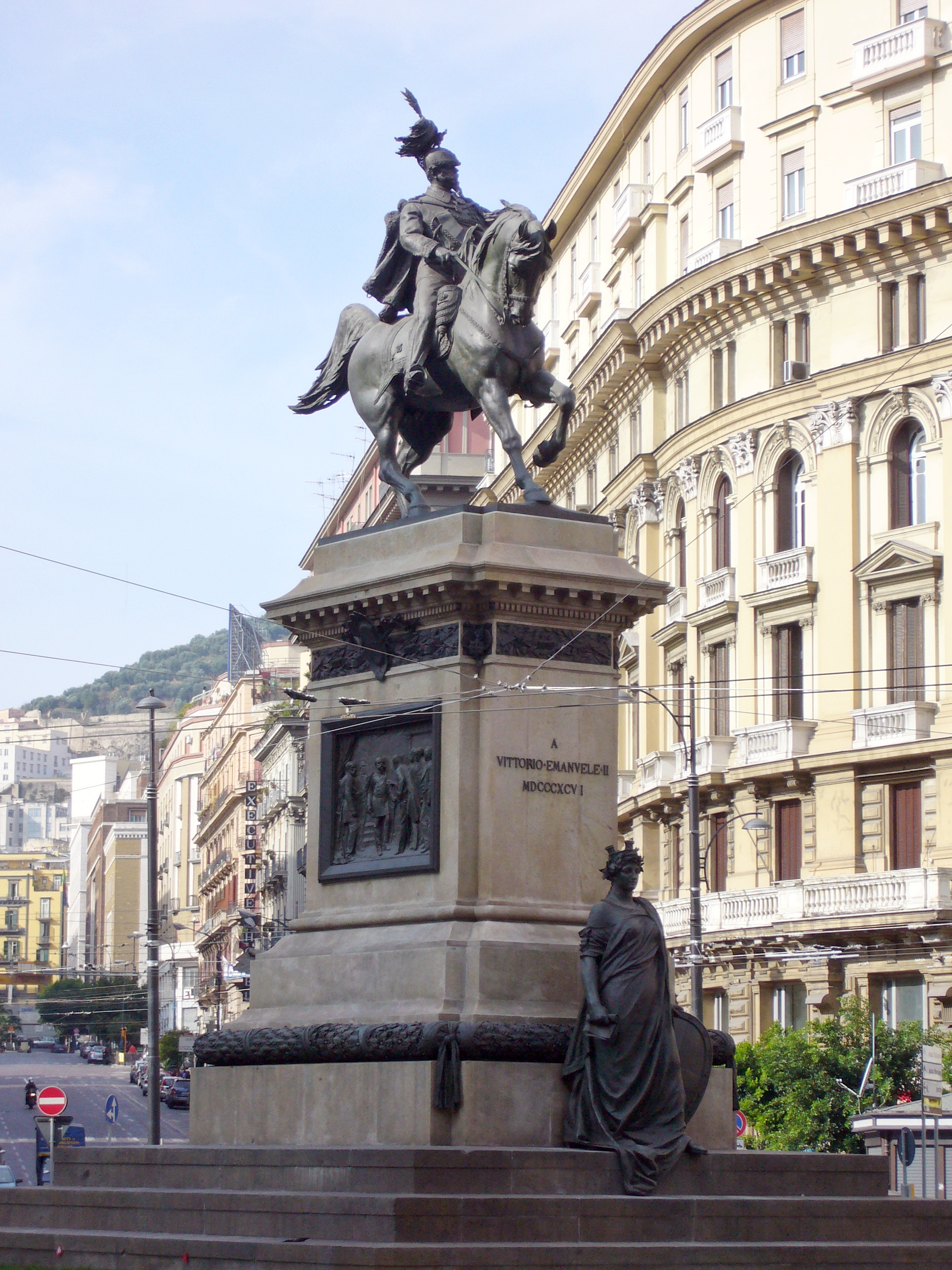
Monument to Vittorio Emanuele II (equestrian statue by Alfonso Balzico, scenes at base by Solari) in Piazza Bovio, Naples.

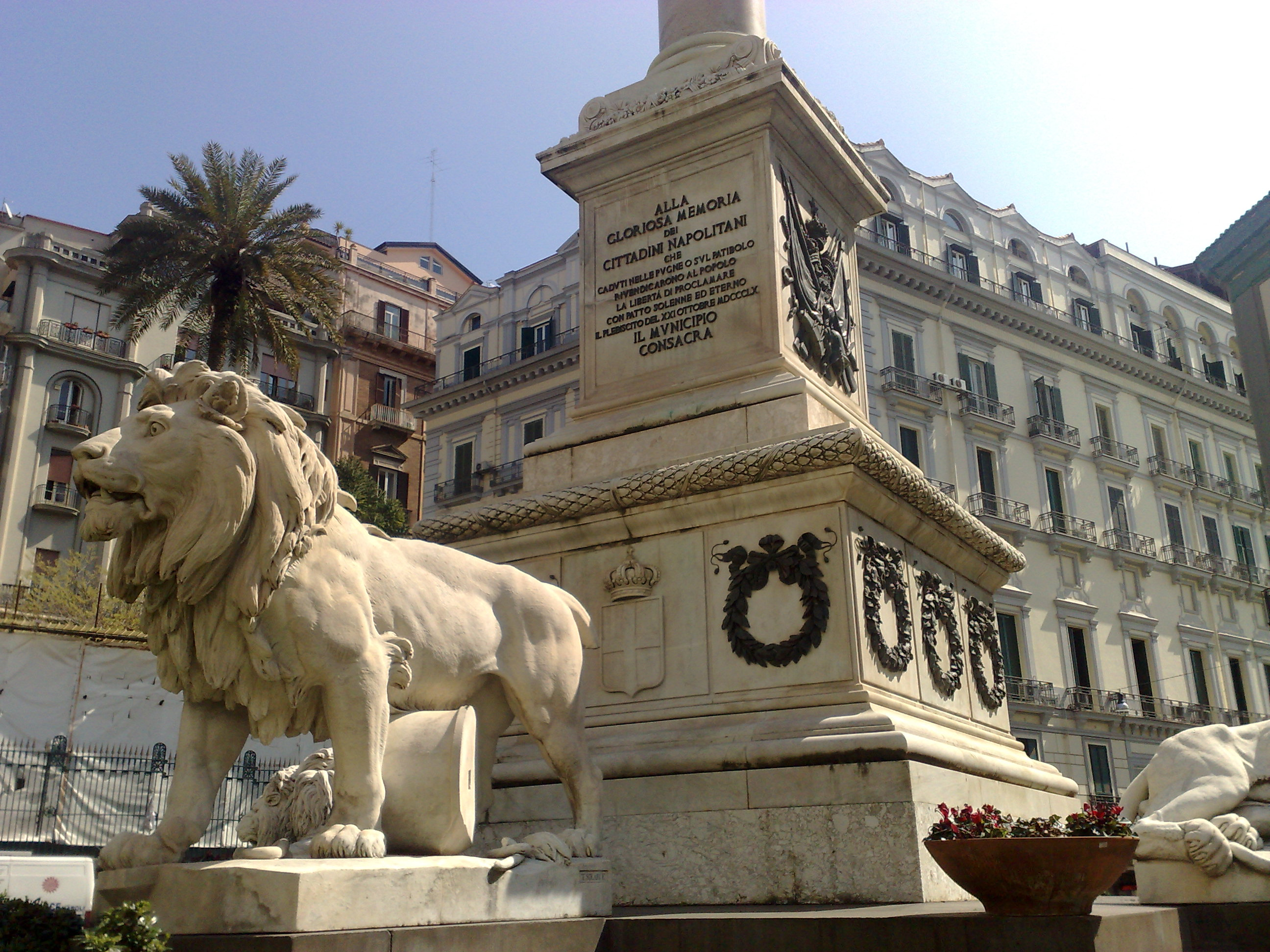
Lion dedicated to fallen Garibaldini of 1860, Piazza dei Martiri, Naples.

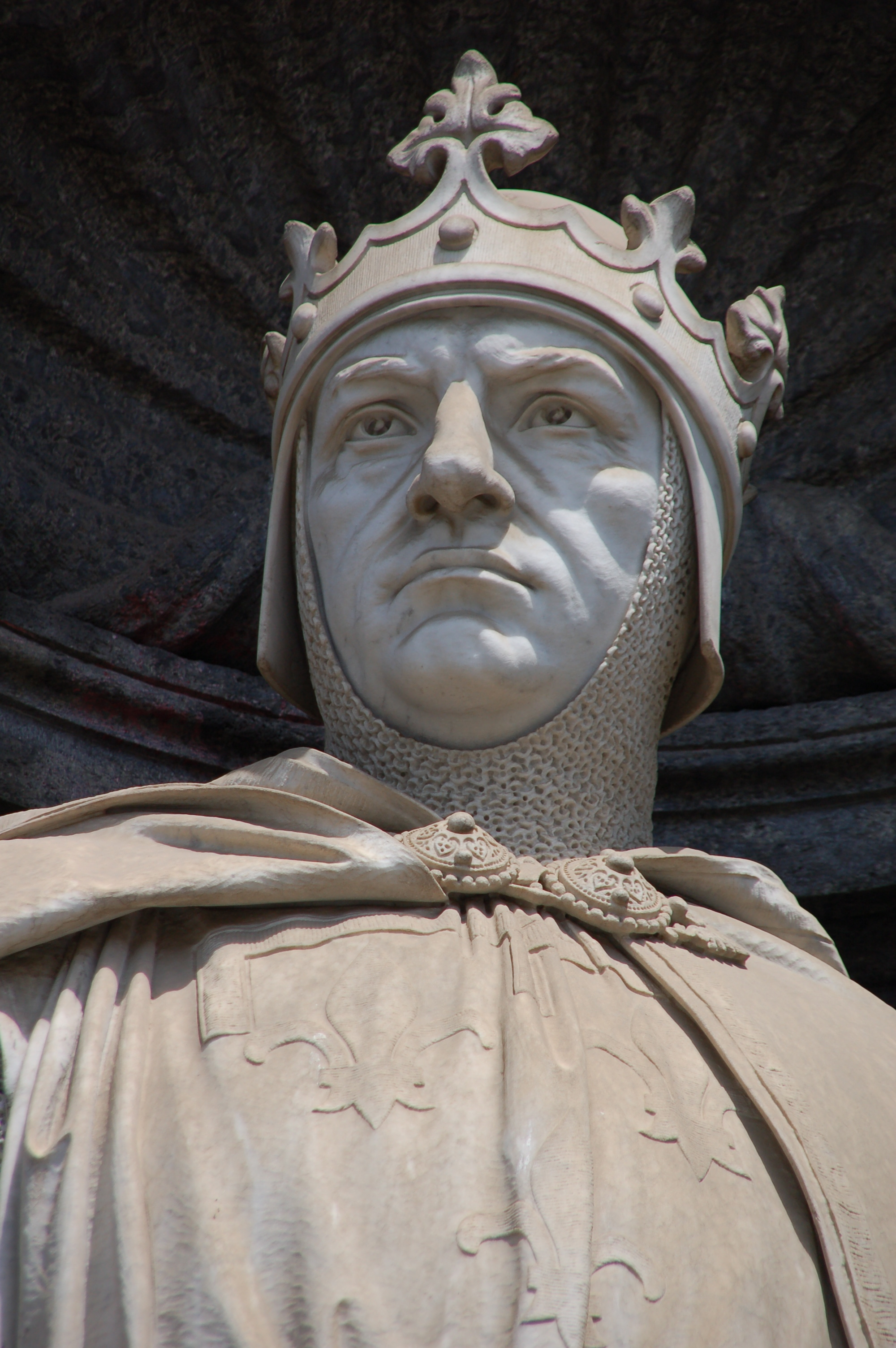
Charles I of Anjou

== Life ==
He was born to a family of artists. His father, Angelo Solari (1775-1846), intended him to become an architect, but, like his father and grandfather (also named Tommaso), the younger Tomasso became a sculptor. The elder Tommaso Solari (died in Caserta in 1779) had created numerous copies of classical works for the gardens and Palace of Caserta. Many of those free-standing works now fill the gardens of the Villa Comunale in Naples.

The younger Tommaso, after a year of studying sculpture in Naples, he won a pension to study in Rome. In the scuola del nudo exhibitions of Rome, and in diverse Expositions, he was awarded numerous prizes. At the Expositions of 1846 and of 1848 he won gold medals. At the London International Exhibition of 1851, he was awarded the commemorative medal, and in Florence, the medal of merit. He became adjunct sculptor at the Institute of Fine Arts of Naples, an academician of merit at the sculptor classes of the Accademia di San Luca of Rome, and associate of the Royal Academy of Naples.

His students include Achille D'Orsi and Raffaele Belliazzi.

== Work ==
Among the many biblical and mythologic subjects sculpted by Solari are:

- Abigail soothes the wrath of David (large bas relief)
- Christ speaking to his disciples (large bas-relief)
- Sinite parvulos ad me venire (Let the children come to me), (large bas relief)
- Christ (larger than life, for chapel of Royal Palace of Naples)
- Virgin and child, (Chapel of the lord of Reudel).
- A Virgin with a crown of Saints, (Church of Piedigrotta).
- Annunziata and Young Virgin presented at the Temple (Main church of Capua)
- The Risen Christ, (bas relief in bronze)
- A Virgin of Miracles, (statue in silver)
- St Thomas Aquinas and St Augustine, (Gaeta Cathedral)
- San Tommaso, (University of Naples)
- Sant' Antonino, (larger than life statue for piazza of Sorrento)
- Putti, (Villa of the Prince of Naples)
- Medea and her two children
- A Slave, (exhibited in Paris)
- La baccante, (life-size, Pinacoteca of Capodimonte)
- Venere vincitrice, (For the Grand Duke Nicholas Konstantinovich of Russia, copy of Antonio Canova statue with face modelled after the Grand Duke's mistress, Fanny Lear)
- Monument to Sir Harry Parkers, (minister plenipotentiary of Great Britain to China)
- Marble life-size statue of Tomás Terry, for the peristyle of the Theater of Cienfuegos, Cuba.
- Heroe of Two Worlds, (Larger than life, for Corato.
- Monument to Garibaldi, (bronze, Torre del Greco)
- Bust of Camillo Benso (1862, Naples)
- Statue of Charles of Anjou, for the Royal Palace of Naples.
- Busts of twelve noted Neapolitan jurists, for the main hall of the Court of Appeals of Naples.
- Monument to Paolina Ranieri, (Chapel of Santa Chiara, Naples)
- Marble statue of Hope for tomb of Armenio family, (Camposanto of Naples)
- Monument for Mancuso Family, (Camposanto of Naples)
- Portrait of a young man, (life-size for Notariis tomb)
- Monument of Piazza dei Martiri, Naples (One of four Lions)
- Monument to Carlo Poerio, (Piazza Carità, Naples)
- Monument to Columbus, (Institute of Tarsia)
- Bust of Giuseppe Fiorelli (1867, Museo San Martino, Naples)
- Monument to Giovanni Battista Vico, (Institute of Tarsia)

== Recognition ==
Solari was awarded both the Cross of SS. Maurizio e Lazzaro and the Order of the Crown of Italy. The critic Agostino Della Sala Spada wrote of him:

"Solari was not a revolutionary, nor a leader of a scuola, nor a grandiose man, like many young artists do today. He is modest, lives the good, has a good bourgeois habits, quality that immediately captivate the good will, respect, and affection of those who approach him.

Regarding his statue of Charles of Anjou the critic continued:

This sculpture honest, fair, academic in style, which has done so much honor in Naples, his art respects the past and it continues the beautiful and glorious traditions, showing novelty only in time ... it draws the best from the past and the present ... for a while, the ungrateful and unworthy pupils accused him of senility, of not reflecting reality, of overly academic, and I know, the master of this art, art fair, made of serenity and of constant work, has emerged powerfully, so no doubt, once again, for feeling, for dignity, for modelling . And while it is true that the folds of the mantle are a bit adjusted, do not forget, that the sculpture can not be never sciamannatezza (good for nothing), that certain lines is well kept, the composure that stops the eye, and there conquers, while certain daring project for the innovators, who decry it and can not explain it, and that, finally, if the face of Charles d'Anjou fails, humanly, unpleasant and repulsive, so, and not otherwise, unless the artist had not wanted to betray the story, he had to, and wanted to represent him.
