= Results of the 2024 French legislative election in Puy-de-Dôme =

Following the first round of the 2024 French legislative election on 30 June 2024, runoff elections in each constituency where no candidate received a vote share greater than 50 percent were scheduled for 7 July. Candidates permitted to stand in the runoff elections needed to either come in first or second place in the first round or achieve more than 12.5 percent of the votes of the entire electorate (as opposed to 12.5 percent of the vote share due to low turnout).

== Puy-de-Dôme ==
=== 1st constituency ===
| Candidate | Party or alliance | | First round | | Second round | |
| Candidate | Party or alliance | | Votes | % | Votes | % |
|---|---|---|---|---|---|---|
| Marianne Maximi | New Popular Front | Ecosocialist Left | 20,841 | 38.14 | 23,772 | 43.24 |
| Louis Clément | National Rally | | 15,025 | 27.50 | 16,311 | 29.67 |
| Hervé Prononce | Ensemble | Horizons | 13,156 | 24.08 | 14,898 | 27.10 |
| Sébastien Galpier | The Republicans | | 4,890 | 8.95 | | |
| Dominique Leclair | Far-left | Lutte Ouvrière | 733 | 1.34 | | |
| Total | | | 54,645 | 100.00 | 54,981 | 100.00 |
| Valid votes | | | 54,645 | 97.44 | 54,981 | 97.48 |
| Invalid votes | | | 488 | 0.87 | 427 | 0.76 |
| Blank votes | | | 948 | 1.69 | 996 | 1.77 |
| Total votes | | | 56,081 | 100.00 | 56,404 | 100.00 |
| Registered voters/turnout | | | 83,788 | 66.93 | 83,805 | 67.30 |

=== 2nd constituency ===
| Candidate | Party or alliance | | First round | | Second round | |
| Candidate | Party or alliance | | Votes | % | Votes | % |
|---|---|---|---|---|---|---|
| Christine Pires-Beaune | New Popular Front | Socialist Party | 23,175 | 36.20 | 34,546 | 56.63 |
| Isabelle Dupré | National Rally | | 21,987 | 34.34 | 26,453 | 43.37 |
| Sarah Chauvin | The Republicans | | 9,044 | 14.13 | | |
| Jean-Paul Lebrec | Ensemble | Renaissance | 8,203 | 12.81 | | |
| Franck Truchon | Far-left | Lutte Ouvrière | 969 | 1.51 | | |
| Marion Godu | Reconquête | | 645 | 1.01 | | |
| Total | | | 64,023 | 100.00 | 60,999 | 100.00 |
| Valid votes | | | 64,023 | 97.27 | 60,999 | 92.56 |
| Invalid votes | | | 596 | 0.91 | 1,319 | 2.00 |
| Blank votes | | | 1,202 | 1.83 | 3,587 | 5.44 |
| Total votes | | | 65,821 | 100.00 | 65,905 | 100.00 |
| Registered voters/turnout | | | 90,283 | 72.91 | 90,172 | 73.09 |

=== 3rd constituency ===
| Candidate | Party or alliance | | First round | | Second round | |
| Candidate | Party or alliance | | Votes | % | Votes | % |
|---|---|---|---|---|---|---|
| Nicolas Bonnet | New Popular Front | The Ecologists | 20,470 | 31.72 | 23,816 | 37.12 |
| Laurence Vichnievsky | Ensemble | Democratic Movement | 16,800 | 26.03 | 21,525 | 33.55 |
| Nadine Pers | National Rally | | 16,735 | 25.93 | 18,822 | 29.33 |
| Marie-Anne Marchis | The Republicans | | 8,863 | 13.73 | | |
| Marie Savre | Far-left | Lutte Ouvrière | 759 | 1.18 | | |
| Patrick Finotto | Reconquête | | 573 | 0.89 | | |
| Louis Dupic | Miscellaneous right | Independent | 277 | 0.43 | | |
| René Ondet | Miscellaneous left | Independent | 64 | 0.10 | | |
| Total | | | 64,541 | 100.00 | 64,163 | 100.00 |
| Valid votes | | | 64,541 | 97.41 | 64,163 | 96.93 |
| Invalid votes | | | 562 | 0.85 | 514 | 0.78 |
| Blank votes | | | 1,154 | 1.74 | 1,521 | 2.30 |
| Total votes | | | 66,257 | 100.00 | 66,198 | 100.00 |
| Registered voters/turnout | | | 90,194 | 73.46 | 90,191 | 73.40 |

=== 4th constituency ===
| Candidate | Party or alliance | | First round | | Second round | |
| Candidate | Party or alliance | | Votes | % | Votes | % |
|---|---|---|---|---|---|---|
| Benjamin Chalus | National Rally | | 22,290 | 31.62 | 25,663 | 37.72 |
| Delphine Lingemann | Ensemble | Democratic Movement | 19,299 | 27.38 | 42,380 | 62.28 |
| Valérie Goléo | New Popular Front | La France Insoumise | 18,769 | 26.63 | | |
| Florence Dubessy | The Republicans | | 8,419 | 11.94 | | |
| François Marotte | Far-left | Lutte Ouvrière | 1,137 | 1.61 | | |
| Pascale Sanchez | Reconquête | | 569 | 0.81 | | |
| Total | | | 70,483 | 100.00 | 68,043 | 100.00 |
| Valid votes | | | 70,483 | 96.81 | 68,043 | 93.82 |
| Invalid votes | | | 775 | 1.06 | 1,136 | 1.57 |
| Blank votes | | | 1,544 | 2.12 | 3,349 | 4.62 |
| Total votes | | | 72,802 | 100.00 | 72,528 | 100.00 |
| Registered voters/turnout | | | 101,981 | 71.39 | 101,980 | 71.12 |

=== 5th constituency ===
| Candidate | Party or alliance | | First round | | Second round | |
| Candidate | Party or alliance | | Votes | % | Votes | % |
|---|---|---|---|---|---|---|
| André Chassaigne | New Popular Front | Communist Party | 27,137 | 37.78 | 38,293 | 55.27 |
| Brigitte Carletto | National Rally | | 26,595 | 37.02 | 30,993 | 44.73 |
| Véronique Bastet | Ensemble | Renaissance | 11,166 | 15.54 | | |
| Yves Courthaliac | The Republicans | | 6,154 | 8.57 | | |
| Gabrielle Capron | Far-left | Lutte Ouvrière | 783 | 1.09 | | |
| Total | | | 71,835 | 100.00 | 69,286 | 100.00 |
| Valid votes | | | 71,835 | 97.15 | 69,286 | 92.89 |
| Invalid votes | | | 727 | 0.98 | 1,400 | 1.88 |
| Blank votes | | | 1,383 | 1.87 | 3,901 | 5.23 |
| Total votes | | | 73,945 | 100.00 | 74,587 | 100.00 |
| Registered voters/turnout | | | 105,052 | 70.39 | 105,057 | 71.00 |
