= Santa Maria della Carità =

Santa Maria della Carità (English: "St Mary (or, Our Lady) of Charity") may refer to:

== Churches ==
- Santa Maria della Carità, Bologna
- Santa Maria della Carità, Brescia
- Santa Maria della Carità, Mantua
- Santa Maria della Carità, Naples
- Santa Maria della Carità, Venice, part of the Scuola dell Carità complex, home of the Gallerie dell'Accademia
- Scrovegni Chapel, Padua, Italy, dedicated to Santa Maria della Carità

== Depictions ==
- The Stonemason's Yard, a painting by Giovanni Antonio Canal ("Canaletto")

== See also ==
- Santa Maria la Carità, a comune in the Province of Naples, Italy
