= Tomás Terry =

Cuban business magnate

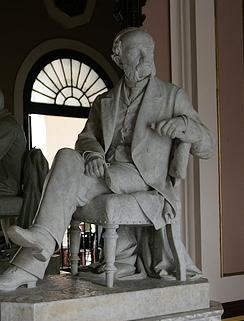
- Marble statue of Tomás Terry in the lobby of the Terry theatre, Cienfuegos, Cuba; sculptor Tommaso Solari
- Born: February 24, 1808; Caracas, Venezuela
- Died: July 5, 1886 (aged 78); Paris, France
- Occupations: Businessman, slave trader
- Known for: One of the richest Cuban business magnates
- Spouse: Teresa Dorticós y Gómez de Leys (m. 1837)
- Children: 10

Tomás Terry y Adán (24 February 1808 in Caracas, Venezuela – 5 July 1886 in Paris, France) was a Cuban business magnate. His fortune grew to be among the largest in the world in his day.

== Family origins ==
Of Irish paternal descent, Terry was born in Caracas to Spanish-born José Antonio Terry y Mendoza, who had settled in Venezuela from Cádiz, and wife Tomasa Adán y España. Following the Cromwellian conquest of Ireland, the Terrys had fled their hometown of Cork for Catholic countries such as Spain, France and the states of the Italian Peninsula.

The Spanish branch, established in Cádiz and El Puerto de Santa María, became involved in trade with the Indies and Sherry production quite successfully, as in less than a decade from their arrival many of its members were knighted in the Order of Santiago and Guillermo Terry was granted the title of Marquis of la Cañada by King Philip V, on 8 September 1729.

== Life ==
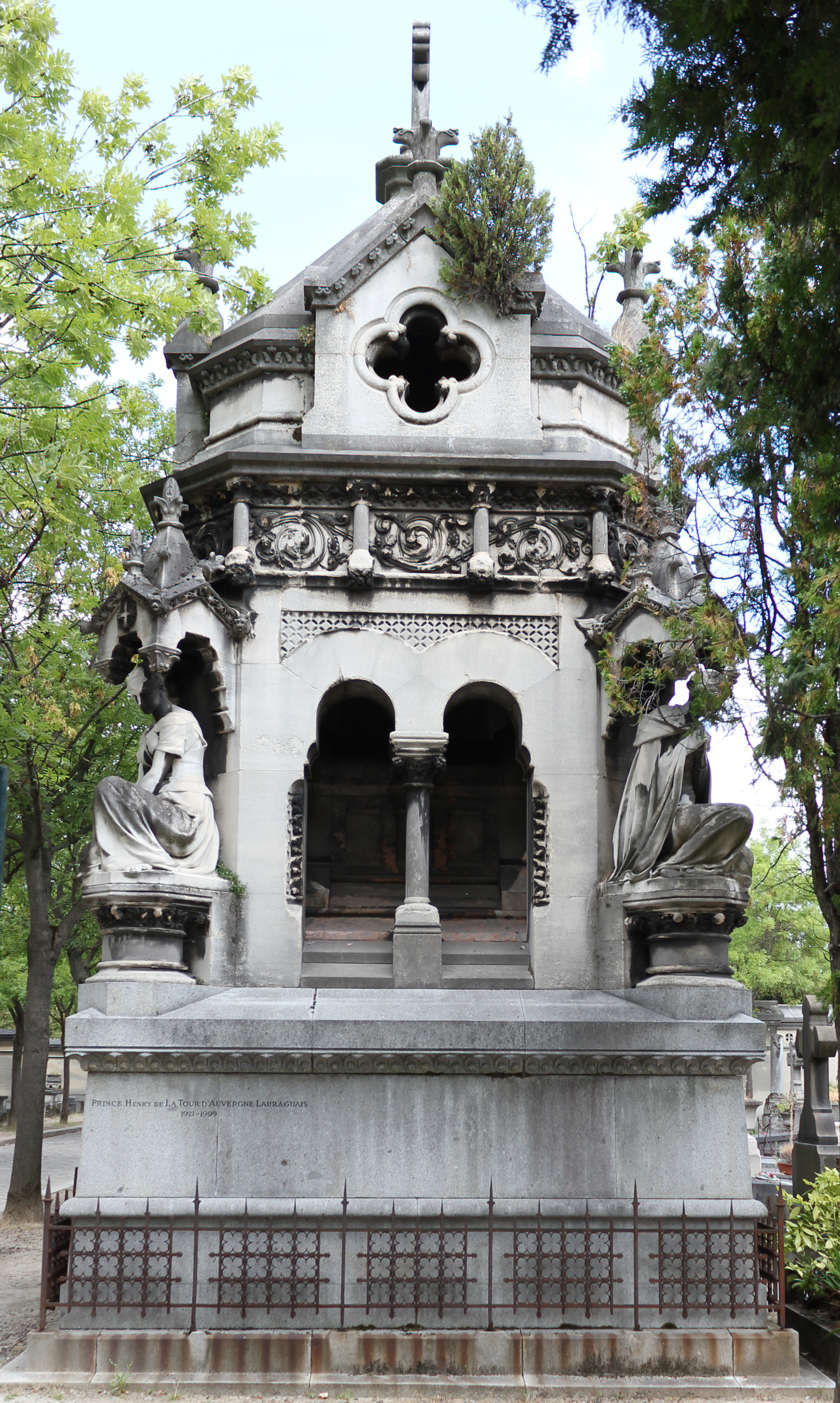
Père-Lachaise Cemetery.

Terry initially became involved in the slave trade in Cuba, making his first $10,000 by buying sick slaves, nursing them back to health, and then reselling them healthy for a large profit.

He bought the Caracas sugar mill for $23,000, and upgraded it to be the first in Cuba to use electricity. He went on to make a fortune through involvement in all aspects of the economy, from the sugar trade and slave trade to banking and imports, becoming the dominant businessman in Cienfuegos and earning the nickname the "Cuban Croesus".

His fortune grew to be among the largest in the world, with a net worth of about $725,000 in 1851, $3,090,00 in 1860, $7,890,000 in 1870, $13,760,000 in 1880, and over $25,000,000 at his death in 1886, which occurred in Paris, where he was buried in Père Lachaise Cemetery (division 92).

== Descendants ==
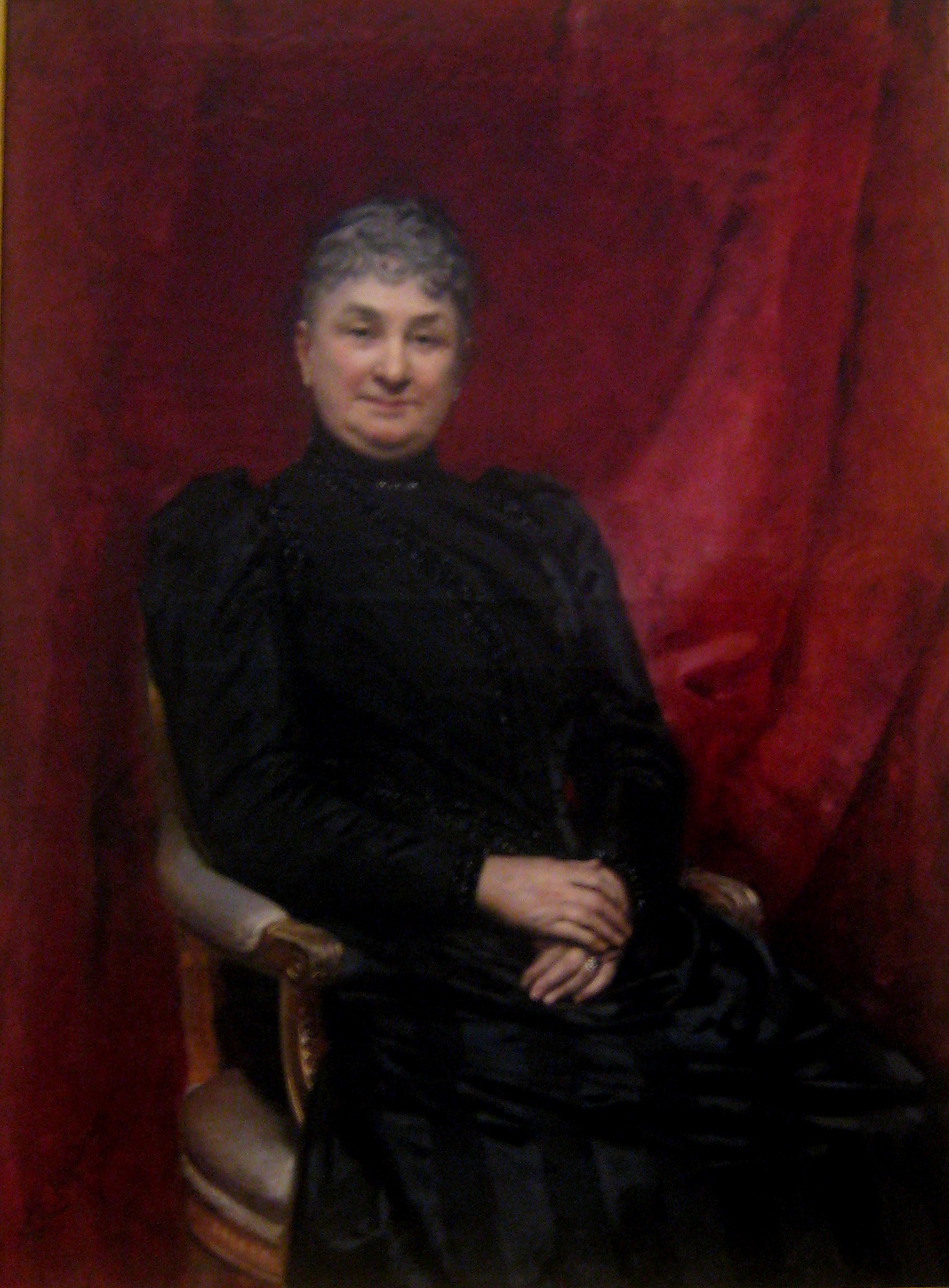
Portrait of María del Carmen Terry, 1st Marchioness of Perinat by Raimundo Madrazo. Madrid, Museo del Prado.

On 31 October 1837, Terry married Teresa Dorticós y Gómez de Leys, daughter of Andrés Dorticós, a prominent local merchant and governor of Cienfuegos, and María del Carmen Gómez de Leys y La Puente. They had 10 children:

- Tomás
- Teresa
- Andrés
- María del Carmen, wife Guillermo Perinat y Ochoa, treasurer of the Royal Incomes. On 6 March 1893, she was granted of title of Marchioness of Perinat by Queen Regent Maria Christina of Austria on the name of her son Alfonso XIII. She had two children:
  - Luis (1872–1923), married to Ana María de Elío y Gaztelu, 9th Marchioness of Campo Real, Grandee of Spain (1895–1964), with issue.
  - María Teresa (1875–1918), married to José Alfonso de Bustos y Ruiz de Arana, 3rd Duke of Andría, Grandee of Spain (1883–1940), without issue.
- Eudardo
- Juan Pedro
- Francisco Javier (1850–1918). Married to Antonia Sánchez y Sarriá and had three children:
  - Natalia (1877–1962), married to French politician Count Stanislas de Castellane (1876–1959), younger brother of celebrated dandy Boni de Castellane, with issue.
  - Emilio (1890–1969), famous architect, interior decorator and landscape designer.
  - Odette, married to Prince Charles de La Tour d'Auvergne-Lauraguais (1877–1940), with issue.
- José Emilio (1853–1911), deputy to Cortes for the province of Havana in 1886. Married to Silvia Alfonso-Aldama y Fonts, without issue.
- María Natividad (1854–1928), married to Italian politician and diplomat Baron Alberto Blanc (1835–1904), Minister of Foreign Affairs of the Kingdom of Italy from 1893 to 1896. They had three children:
  - Margherita (1884–1961), married Camillo Ruspoli, 2nd Prince of Candriano (1882–1949), without surviving issue.
  - Giovanni Alberto, Baron Blanc
  - Giulio (1891–1878), married to Lavinia Lante Montefeltro della Rovere (1904–1935), with issue.
- Antonio (1857–1899), married firstly Grace Dalton Secor in 1876, he then married his second wife American soprano Sybil Sanderson (1864–1903) From his second marriage, he had a daughter. Antonio Terry and Grace Dalton Secor were married in 1876 in New York City and their daughter, Natividad Marta Maria Dolores Mercedes Terry, was born in 1881. She was Sibyl Sanderson's stepdaughter. The engagement of Sibyl Sanderson to Antonio Terry was announced in the New York Herald in August 1894.
  - María Natividad (1882–1960), married to Prince Guy Charles de Faucigny-Lucinge et Coligny (1876–1914), great-grandson of Charles Ferdinand, Duke of Berry through his daughter Charlotte, Countess of Issoudun, bore by his mistress Amy Brown (with issue, including Anne-Aymone Giscard d'Estaing).
