= Anne-Aymone Giscard d'Estaing =

Spouse of the President of France from 1974 to 1981

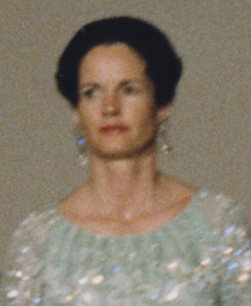
- Mme Giscard d'Estaing in 1976

Spouse of the President of France
- In role 27 May 1974 – 21 May 1981
- President: Valéry Giscard d'Estaing
- Preceded by: Claude Pompidou
- Succeeded by: Danielle Mitterrand

Personal details
- Born: Anne-Aymone Marie Josèphe Christiane Sauvage de Brantes; 10 April 1933 (age 92) Paris, France
- Spouse: Valéry Giscard d'Estaing (m. 1952; died 2020)
- Children: 4, including Henri and Louis
- Education: École du Louvre

Anne-Aymone Marie Josèphe Christiane Giscard d'Estaing (née Sauvage de Brantes; born 10 April 1933) is the widow of former president of France Valéry Giscard d'Estaing.

== Biography ==
She is a daughter of François Marie Joseph Abel Henri Sauvage, Count de Brantes, and his wife, Princess Aymone Marie Sylvie Renée Françoise de Faucigny-Lucinge et Coligny, a great-great-granddaughter of Charles Ferdinand, duc de Berry by his mistress Amy Brown. She grew up at the Château de Fresne in Touraine.

Her father died in Mauthausen-Gusen concentration camp on 8 May 1944.

Anne-Aymone is a great-niece of the Cuban-born French designer and architect José Emilio Terry y Dorticos and the aunt of Roger Marie Joseph Henri Sauvage de Brantes, the present Marquis de Brantes. Through her mother she is a great-great-granddaughter of Cuban business magnate Tomás Terry y Adán.

Her great-grandfather was Henri Schneider, himself the son of Eugène Schneider, founder of what would become the international syndicate, Schneider Group.

On 17 December 1952, she married Valery Giscard d'Estaing. The couple lived in her family home for the early years of their marriage, before settling at the rue Bénouville in the 16th arrondissement of Paris.

The couple had four children: two sons, Henri and Louis, and two daughters, Valérie-Anne and Jacinte.

As First Lady of France, Anne-Aymone set up the Fondation pour l’Enfance in 1977 to raise awareness of child abuse.

In later years, the couple divided their time between Paris and Authon, Loir-et-Cher: Valery died in December 2020 and is buried in Authon.

In December 2022, Anne-Aymone Giscard d'Estaing put up some of her and her late husband's art and furniture for sale at Hotel Drouot as she planned to move to a smaller Paris home.

== Ancestry ==
Ancestors of Anne-Aymone Giscard d'Estaing

16. Denis Sauvage
8. Roger Sauvage de Brantes
17. Louise Mosselmann
4. Paul Sauvage de Brantes, Marquis de Brantes
18. François Lacuée, Comte de Cessac
9. Louise Lacuée de Cessac
19. Zélie de Montesquiou-Fezensac
2. François Sauvage de Brantes, Comte de Brantes
20. Eugène Schneider
10. Henri Schneider
21. Constance Le Moine des Mares
5. Marguerite Schneider
22. Louis Amédée Carbonel
11. Eudoxie Asselin
23. Marie-Eudoxie Asselin
1. Anne-Aymone Sauvage de Brantes
24. Ferdinand de Faucigny-Lucinge et Coligny, Prince de Faucigny-Lucinge et Coligny
12. Charles de Faucigny-Lucinge et Coligny, Prince de Faucigny-Lucinge et Coligny
25. Princess Charlotte de Bourbon, Comtesse d'Issoudun
6. Prince Guy de Faucigny-Lucinge et Coligny
26. Robert de Sesmaisons, Comte de Sesmaisons
13. Françoise de Sesmaisons
27. Cécile de Kergorlay
3. Aymone de Faucigny-Lucinge et Coligny
28. Tomás Terry y Adán
14. Antonio Terry y Dorticos
29. Teresa Dorticós y Gómez de Leys
7. María Natividad Terry y Dalton-Secor
30. George Dalton
15. Grace Dalton-Secor
31. Hannah Secor

Unofficial roles
Preceded by Claude Pompidou	Spouse of the President of France; 1974–1981	Succeeded by Danielle Mitterrand
