= Raffaele Belliazzi =

Italian sculptor and painter (1835–1917)

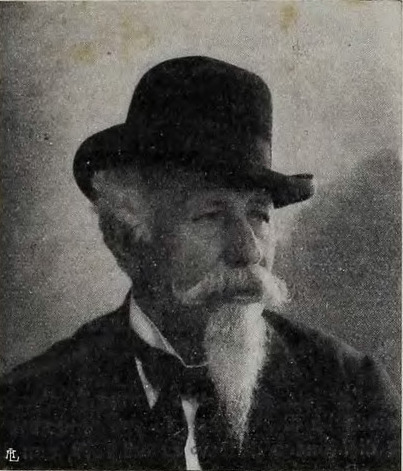
- Born: 9 December 1835; Naples
- Died: 23 May 1917 (aged 81); Naples
- Occupation: Sculptor, painter

Raffaele Belliazzi (December 9, 1835 – 1917) was an Italian sculptor and painter.

== Life and career ==
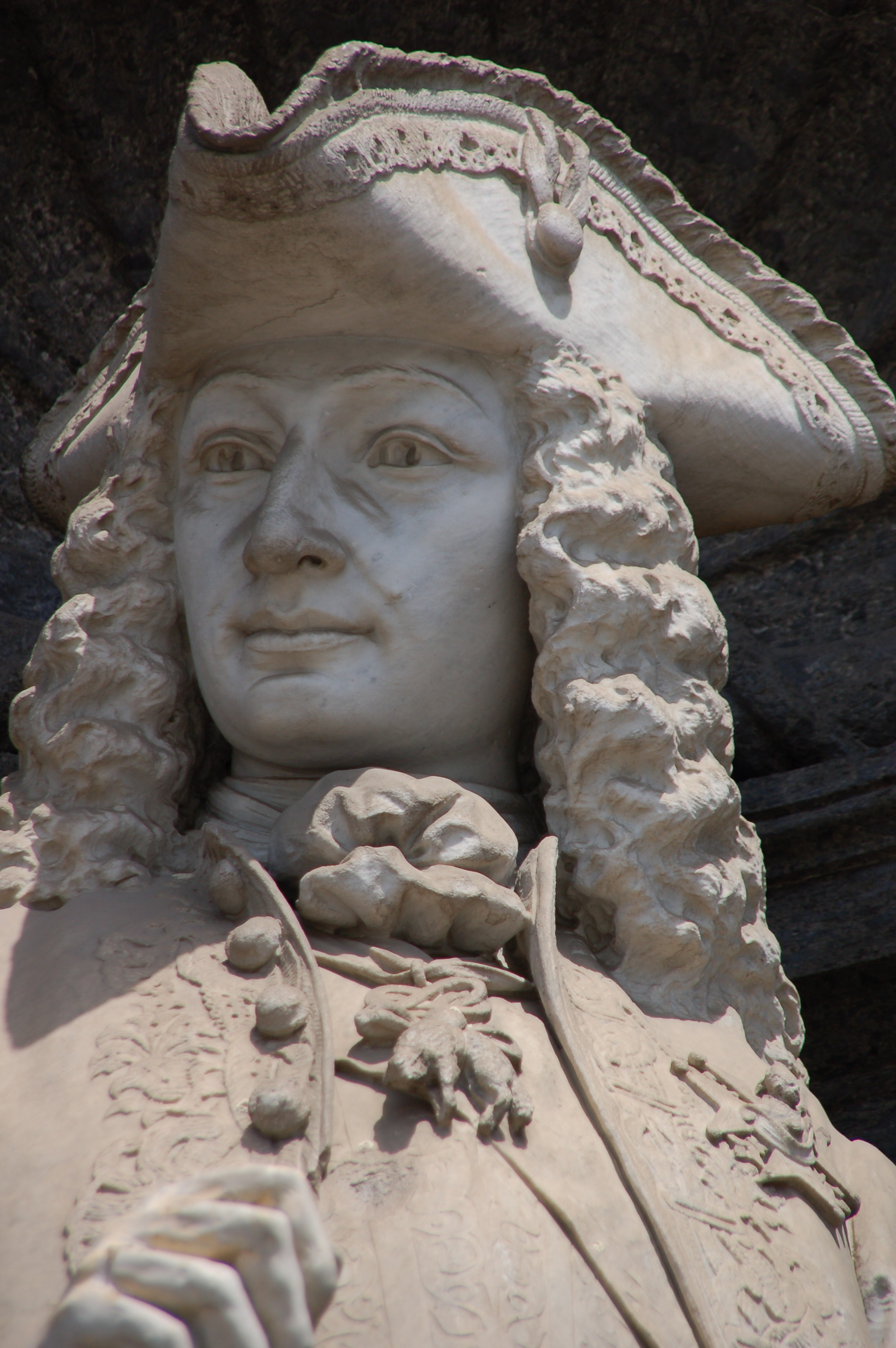
Charles the III on facade of Royal Palace of Naples.

Belliazzi was born in Naples. His father carved architectural decoration. Belliazzi received his first training from Tommaso Solari in Naples, but followed the styles of Alfonso Balzico and Stanislao Lista.

Belliazzi completed one of the statues, of King Charles III of Spain, outside of the Royal Palace of Naples. In 1869 at Naples and in 1870 at Parma, he exhibited a Pinzochera in terra cotta, for which he was awarded a silver medal. In 1872, in Milan, he exhibited a Springtime, which had genre characteristics and depicted Neapolitan peasants. In 1873, at Vienna he exhibited an expressive Orfanella. For other works, he earned a gold medal at the 1874 Esposizione of Florence. At the 1877 Esposizione of Naples, he exhibited a Riposo del pastore and a group L'avvicinarsi della procella (Capodimonte Museum). When this latter sculptural group was exhibited as a marble sculpture at the Esposizione of Naples, it won a first prize, gold medal at the World's Exhibition in Paris in 1878, and another at the 1880 Monaco exhibition. The Italian government awarded him knighthood in the Order of the Crown of Italy. At the 1880 Mostra of Turin, he exhibited a statuette titled Chicken Salesman. At the Mostra nazionale of Milan and the promotrice of Naples, he exhibited a Rigido marzo.

From 1895 to 1912, Belliazzi was professor of ornamental decoration at the Academy of Fine Arts of Naples. He died in 1917 in Naples.
