= Athanase-Charles-Marie Charette de la Contrie =

French general (1832–1911)

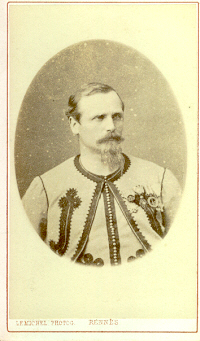
- Athanase-Charles-Marie Charette de La Contrie in 1871
- Born: 3 September 1832; Nantes, France
- Died: 9 October 1911 (aged 79); Saint-Père-Marc-en-Poulet, France
- Military career
- Allegiance: Duchy of Modena and Reggio (1846–1856); Papal States (1860–1870); Third French Republic (1870–1871)
- Branch: Infantry
- Service years: 1846–1871
- Rank: Général de brigade
- Commands: Papal Zouaves; Légion des volontaires de l'Ouest
- Conflicts: Unification of Italy: Battle of Castelfidardo; Battle of Mentana; Franco-German War of 1870: Battle of Loigny
- Awards: Légion d'honneur Cross of Metana
- Other work: Elected deputy for Bouches-du-Rhône (1871 : refused to sit)

Athanase Charles Marie de Charette, 2nd Baron de La Contrie (French pronunciation: [atanaz ʃaʁlə maʁi ʃaʁɛt]; 3 September 1832 in Nantes - 9 October 1911 in Saint-Père-Marc-en-Poulet), was a 19th-century general of France who distinguished himself in the defense of the Papal States against the Kingdom of Sardinia and subsequently during the Franco-German war of 1870. He was a grandson of Charles Ferdinand, Duke of Berry, the third child and younger son of Charles X, and Amy Brown, the Duke’s English mistress.

== Early life ==
Athanase Charles Marie Charette de La Contrie was born on 3 September 1832, in Nantes, France. His great-grandfather was Charles X, the penultimate king of France, and his great-uncle, General de Charette, was shot in Nantes on 29 March 1795, during the War in the Vendée. His father, Charles-Athanase de Charette, was a Peer of France since 1823 and so a member of the Chamber of Peers until 1830 revolution. His mother, Louise, Countess de Vierzon, was the daughter of the Duke of Berry and Amy Brown. As the Duchesse de Berry was at that time in hiding at Nantes, and Charette's father was being sought by the police, the child's birth was concealed; he was secretly taken from Nantes on 17 September and was registered in the commune of Sainte-Reine as born on 18 September.

Unwilling, because of his Legitimist antecedents, to serve in France under Louis Philippe, young Charette, in 1846, entered the Military Academy of Turin; he left in 1848 to avoid serving Piedmont-Sardinia, the revolutionary policy of that kingdom being evident to him.

== Military career ==
In 1852, Duke Francis V of Modena, the brother-in-law of Henri, Count of Chambord, who was also an Austrian archduke, appointed Charette sub-lieutenant in an Austrian regiment stationed in the duchy. In 1859, Piedmont annexed Modena, expelled the Austrian troops, and incorporated the duchy's troops into its own army.

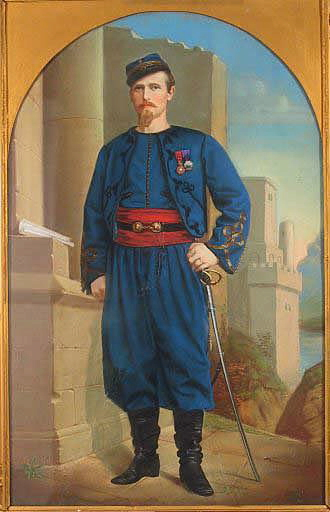
Athanase de Charette.

Charette left Modena, as he did not wish to serve in a revolutionary army.

Athanase and two of his brothers were eager to fight the Italian revolutionaries. In May 1860, his brothers went to the Kingdom of the Two Sicilies, while Athanase went to Rome and placed himself at the service of Pope Pius IX. The Pope commissioned Lamoricière to organise an army to defend the Papal States against the Kingdom of Sardinia. Charette was appointed captain of the first "Company of Franco-Belgian Tirailleurs" (which in 1861 became the Papal Zouaves), and was wounded at the Battle of Castelfidardo (September 1860).

After the capture of Rome by the Kingdom of Italy in 1870, the Zouaves were disbanded. The Frenchmen among them volunteered to serve the French Government of National Defence in the ongoing Franco-Prussian War. They were accepted as "Volunteers of the West" with Charette in command. Charette was wounded and captured at Loigny, but he escaped. On 14 January 1871, he was promoted to general. In the 1871 French legislative election, he was elected to the National Assembly by the department of Bouches-du-Rhône, but he resigned without taking his seat. President Thiers proposed that Charette and his Zouaves formally enter the French Army, but Charette declined. On 15 August 1871, the Zouaves were disbanded. Charette declared his intention to remain at the Pope's disposal and retired to private life. He spent his last thirty years serving the cause of religion and hoping for the monarchy's restoration.

== Personal life ==
In Italy, Charette met his future (second) wife Antoinette Van Leer Polk in the Gilded Age. She was an American Southern belle and the great-niece of the 11th President of the United States, James K. Polk, and the "Mad" General Anthony Wayne of the American Revolutionary War. She was also a direct descendant of Samuel Van Leer, a patriarch of a wealthy family in Pennsylvania known for its anti-slavery cause.

Charette had two children with his first wife and two more with his second. His direct descendant Susan Charette de la Contrie married General Ronald R. Van Stockum.

== Death ==
He died on 9 October 1911.
