= Puy-de-Dôme's 3rd constituency =

Constituency of the National Assembly of France

3rd constituency of Puy-de-Dôme
- inline Constituency of the National Assembly of France

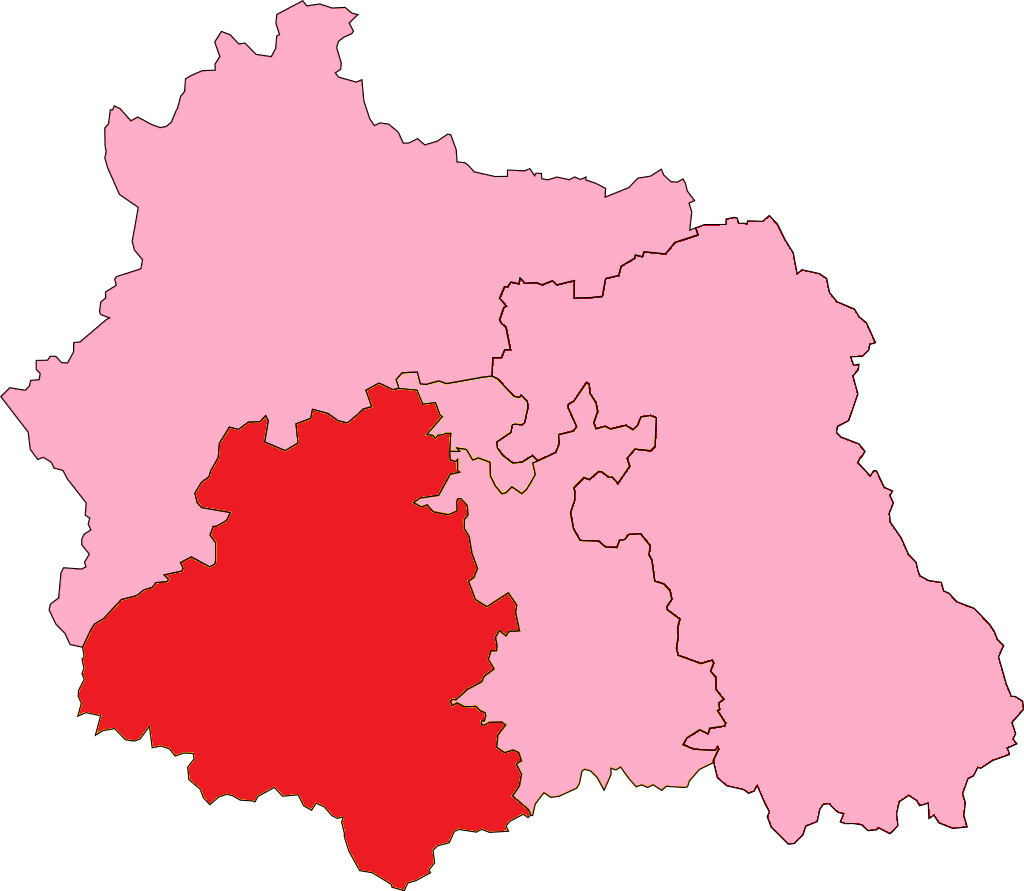
- Puy-de-Dôme's's 3rd Constituency shown within Puy-de-Dôme
- Deputy: Nicolas Bonnet; Les Écologistes
- Department: Puy-de-Dôme
- Cantons: Ardes, Beaumont, Besse-et-Saint-Anastaise, Chamalières, Champeix, Clermont-Ferrand Ouest, Clermont-Ferrand Sud-Ouest, Rochefort-Montagne, Royat, Saint-Amant-Tallande, Tauves, La Tour-d'Auvergne
- Registered voters: 89010

The 3rd constituency of the Puy-de-Dôme (French: Troisième circonscription du Puy-de-Dôme) is a French legislative constituency in the Puy-de-Dôme département. Like the other 576 French constituencies, it elects one MP using a two-round electoral system.

== Description ==
The 3rd constituency of the Puy-de-Dôme lies in the south west of the department and includes the western and south western parts of Clermont-Ferrand.

The constituency is most notable for the fact that it was the political base of former French President Valéry Giscard d'Estaing. Giscard d'Estaing was succeeded by his son Louis in 2002, however he was defeated by the Green candidate in 2012. Louis made an attempt to regain the seat at the 2017 elections however he could only manage second place.

== Assembly Members ==
Election	Member	Party
1988	Valéry Giscard d'Estaing	UDF
2002	Louis Giscard d'Estaing	UMP
2012	Danielle Auroi	EELV
2017	Laurence Vichnievsky	MoDem
2022	Laurence Vichnievsky	MoDem
2024	Nicolas Bonnet	Les Écologistes (Nouveau Front populaire)

== Election results ==
=== 2024 ===
Legislative Election 2024: Puy-de-Dôme's 3rd constituency
Party	Candidate	Votes	%	±%
LR	Marie-Anne Marchis	8,863	13.73	−0.59
MoDem (Ensemble)	Laurence Vichnievsky	16,800	26.03	+3.70
REC	Patrick Finotto	573	0.89	−2.42
LO	Marie Savre	759	1.18	n/a
DIV	Louis Dupic	277	0.43	n/a
RN	Nadine Pers	16,735	25.93	+13.87
DIV	René Ondet	64	0.10	n/a
LÉ–EELV (NFP)	Nicolas Bonnet	20,470	31.72	+1.64
Turnout		64,541	97.41	+97.00
Registered electors		90,194		
2nd round result
LÉ–EELV	Nicolas Bonnet	23,816	37.12	+5.40
MoDem	Laurence Vichnievsky	21,525	33.55	+7.52
RN	Nadine Pers	18,822	29.33	+3.40
Turnout		64,163	96.93	−0.48
Registered electors		90,191		
LÉ–EELV gain from MoDem				

=== 2022 ===
Legislative Election 2022: Puy-de-Dôme's 3rd constituency
Party	Candidate	Votes	%	±%
EELV (NUPÉS)	Nicolas Bonnet	14,363	30.08	+4.38
MoDem (Ensemble)	Laurence Vichnievsky	13,525	28.33	-10.25
LR (UDC)	Marie-Anne Marchis	6,839	14.32	−6.75
RN	Françoise Batisson	5,759	12.06	+5.27
PRG	Florence Lhermet	2,045	4.28	N/A
REC	Mathilde Henry	1,580	3.31	N/A
FGR	Richard Bony	1,186	2.48	N/A
Others	N/A	2,447	-	−
Turnout		47,744	54.41	−0.11
2nd round result
MoDem (Ensemble)	Laurence Vichnievsky	23,042	53.09	-2.93
EELV (NUPÉS)	Nicolas Bonnet	20,358	46.91	N/A
Turnout		43,400	52.44	+5.93
MoDem hold				

=== 2017 ===
Results of the 11 June and 18 June 2017 French National Assembly election in Puy-de-Dôme's 3rd Constituency
Candidate	Party		1st round		2nd round	
Candidate	Party		Votes	%	Votes	%
Laurence Vichnievsky	Democratic Movement	MoDEM	18,384	38.58	20,333	56.02
Louis Giscard d'Estaing	Union of Democrats and Independents	UDI	10,043	21.07	15,966	43.98
Marc Chovin	La France Insoumise	FI	5,683	11.92		
Nicolas Bonnet	Ecologist	ECO	5,260	11.04		
Anne-Marie Carta	National Front	FN	3,234	6.79		
Christophe Serre	The Republicans	LR	2,789	5.85		
Christine Thomas	Communist Party	PCF	1,307	2.74		
Corinne Neveux	Debout la France	DLF	484	1.02		
Josiane Mainville	Far Left	EXG	237	0.50		
Maëlig Le Guern	Independent	DIV	236	0.50		
Total			47,657	100%	36,299	100%
Registered voters			89,004		89,010	
Blank/Void ballots			865	1.78%	5,097	5.73%
Turnout			48,522	54.52%	41,396	46.51%
Abstentions			40,482	45.48%	47,614	53.49%
Result					MoDem GAIN FROM EELV	

=== 2012 ===
Results of the 10 June and 17 June 2012 French National Assembly election in Puy-de-Dôme's 3rd Constituency
Candidate	Party		1st round		2nd round	
Candidate	Party		Votes	%	Votes	%
Louis Giscard d'Estaing	Union for a Popular Movement	UMP	20,426	39.36	25,979	49.08
Danielle Auroi	Europe Ecology – The Greens	EELV	18,901	36.42	26,958	50.92
Patricia Guilhot	Left Front	FG	4,192	8.08		
Marie-Christine Guibert	National Front	FN	3,929	7.57		
Stanislas Renié	New Centre	NC	1,313	2.53		
Philippe Gorce	Miscellaneous Left	DVG	1,109	2.14		
Gérard Weil	Independent	DIV	563	1.08		
Chantal Guillaumin	Ecologist	ECO	536	1.03		
Carole Saby	Ecologist	ECO	302	0.58		
Michèle Aldon	Far Left	EXG	253	0.49		
Claude Dufour	Far Left	EXG	242	0.47		
Arnaud Beils	Independent	DIV	125	0.24		
Total			51,891	100%	52,937	100%
Registered voters			86,568		86,560	
Blank/Void ballots			807	1.53%	1,266	2.34%
Turnout			52,698	60.87%	54,203	62.62%
Abstentions			33,870	39.13%	32,357	37.38%
Result					EELV GAIN FROM UMP	

=== 2007 ===
Legislative Election 2007: Puy-de-Dôme's 3rd constituency
Party	Candidate	Votes	%	±%
UMP	Louis Giscard d'Estaing	20,549	44.64	
PS	Mireille Lacombe	9,864	21.43	
DVG	Alain Brochet	5,057	10.99	
MoDem	Jean-Philippe Valentin	4,178	9.08	
LV	Odile Vignal	1,193	2.59	
EXG	Michel Bidaux	927	2.01	
PCF	Christine Thomas	920	2.00	
Others	N/A	3,340	-	−
Turnout		46,807	62.74	
2nd round result
UMP	Louis Giscard d'Estaing	23,790	53.09	
PS	Mireille Lacombe	21,023	46.91	
Turnout		46,363	62.07	
UMP hold				

=== 2002 ===
Legislative Election 2002: Puy-de-Dôme's 3rd constituency
Party	Candidate	Votes	%	±%
LV	Danielle Auroi	13,109	27.09	
UMP	Louis Giscard d'Estaing	11,907	24.61	
DL	Jean-Marc Boyer	9,590	19.82	
DVD	Dominique Turpin	5,734	11.85	
FN	Marie-Christine Guilbert	2,380	4.92	
LCR	Gérard Bonher	1,409	2.91	
PCF	Christine Gregut	1,233	2.55	
Others	N/A	3,026	-	−
Turnout		49,299	68.69	
2nd round result
UMP	Louis Giscard d'Estaing	22,913	53.75	
LV	Danielle Auroi	19,715	46.25	
Turnout		45,135	62.89	
UMP gain from PPDF				

=== 1997 ===
Legislative Election 1997: Puy-de-Dôme's 3rd constituency
Party	Candidate	Votes	%	±%
PPDF (UDF)	Valery Giscard d'Estaing	15,542	34.64	
LV	Danielle Auroi	13,208	29.44	
DIV	Serge Teillot	5,089	11.34	
FN	Claude Jaffres	3,420	7.62	
PCF	Michel Dugay	2,894	6.45	
LDI	Marc-Antoine Sabatier	1,517	3.38	
GE	Jean-Michel Lavigne	1,175	2.62	
MEI	Claude Bernard	925	2.06	
Others	N/A	1,091	-	−
Turnout		47,378	68.81	
2nd round result
PPDF (UDF)	Valery Giscard d'Estaing	25,147	53.80	
LV	Danielle Auroi	21,593	46.20	
Turnout		49,448	71.82	
PPDF hold				
