= Louis Giscard d'Estaing =

French politician

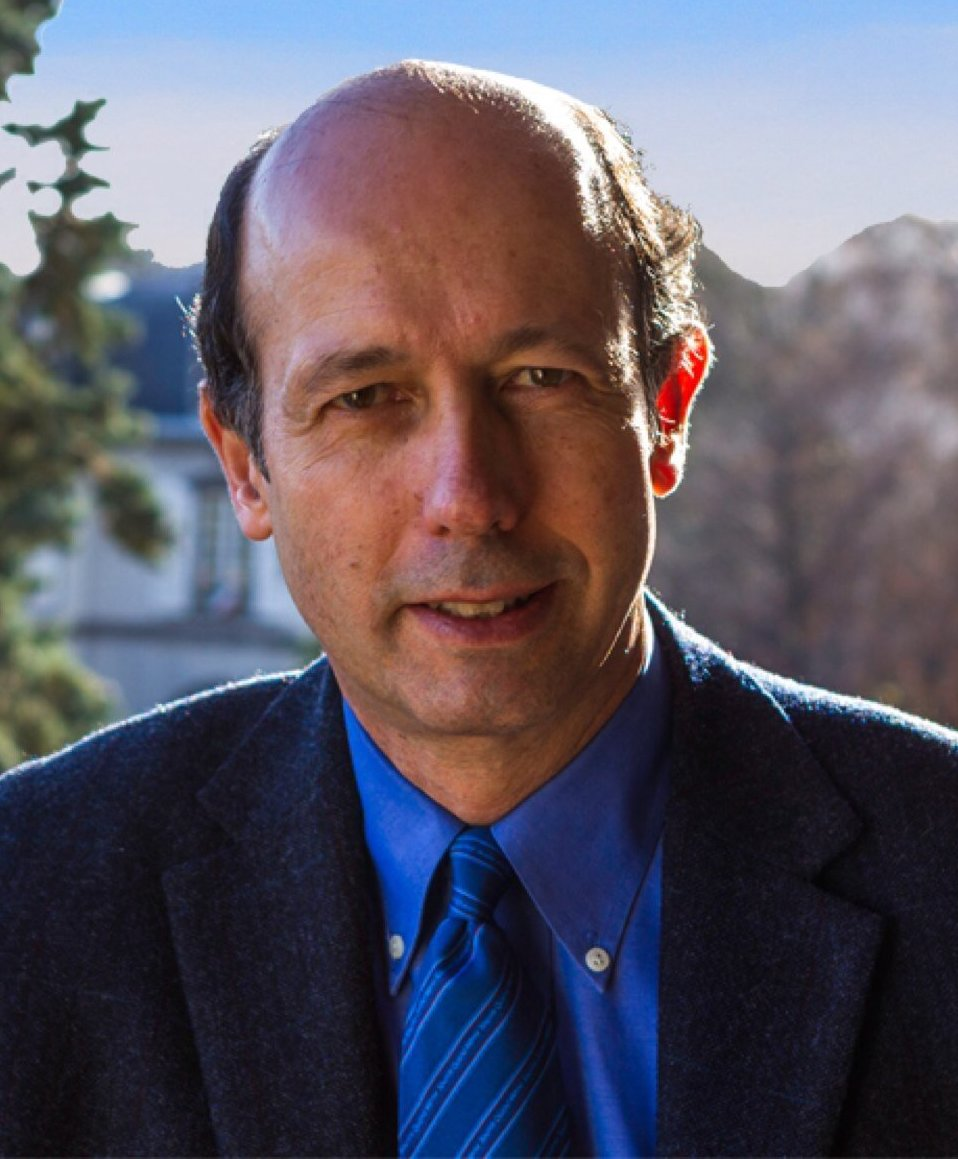

Member of the Regional Council of Auvergne-Rhône-Alpes
- Incumbent
- Assumed office 4 January 2016
- Constituency: Puy-de-Dôme

Mayor of Chamalières
- Incumbent
- Assumed office 16 March 2008

Member of the National Assembly for Puy-de-Dôme's 3rd constituency
- In office 19 June 2002 – 19 June 2012
- Preceded by: Valéry Giscard d'Estaing
- Succeeded by: Danielle Auroi

Personal details
- Born: Louis Joachim Marie François Giscard d'Estaing; 20 October 1958 (age 67) Paris, France
- Party: UDI
- Spouses: Nawal-Alexandra Ebeid (m. 1996; died 2011) Claire Labic (m. 2016)
- Children: Pierre-Louis Giscard d'Estaing
- Parent(s): Valéry Giscard d'Estaing(father); Anne-Aymone Giscard d'Estaing(mother)
- Education: Lycée Saint-Jean de Passy
- Alma mater: Rouen Business School; Panthéon-Assas University

Louis Joachim Marie François Giscard d'Estaing (born 20 October 1958) is a French politician and former member of the National Assembly of France. He is the son of the late President of France Valéry Giscard d'Estaing (1926–2020) and Anne-Aymone Giscard d'Estaing (née Sauvage de Brantes). He was a deputy for the Puy-de-Dôme department from 2002, when he held his father's old seat on his retirement, until 2012 when he was defeated by the Green candidate Danielle Auroi. He remains mayor of Chamalières, a post he has held since 2005. His father had also been mayor of Chamalières from 1967 to 1974.

He was married to musicologist Nawal-Alexandra Ebeid (1959–2011) from 1996 until her death in 2011. She was born in Pasadena, California in 1959 and was a graduate of George Washington University. The couple had one son, Pierre-Louis Giscard d'Estaing. He remarried to Claire Labic in 2016.

== Ancestry ==
Ancestors of Louis Giscard d'Estaing

16. Théodore Giscard
8. Valéry Giscard
17. Marie-Anne de Lusigny
4. Edmond Giscard d'Estaing
18. Edmond Monteil
9. Louise Monteil-Ansaldi
19. Charlotte Ansaldi
2. Valéry Giscard d'Estaing
20. Agénor Bardoux
10. Jacques Bardoux
21. Clémence Villa
5. Marthe Bardoux
22. Georges Picot
11. Geneviève Georges-Picot
23. Marie Adélaïde Bachasson de Montalivet
1. Louis Giscard d'Estaing
24. Roger Sauvage de Brantes
12. Paul Sauvage de Brantes, Marquis de Brantes
25. Louise Lacuée de Cessac
6. François Sauvage de Brantes, Comte de Brantes
26. Henri Schneider
13. Marguerite Schneider
27. Eudoxie Asselin
3. Anne-Aymone Sauvage de Brantes
28. Charles de Faucigny-Lucinge et Coligny, Prince de Faucigny-Lucinge et Coligny
14. Prince Guy de Faucigny-Lucinge et Coligny
29. Françoise de Sesmaisons
7. Aymone de Faucigny-Lucinge et Coligny
30. Antonio Terry y Dorticos
15. María Natividad Dorticos y Dalton-Secor
31. Grace Dalton-Secor
