= Henri Giscard d'Estaing =

French businessman (born 1956)

- Born: Henri Marie Edmond Valéry Giscard d'Estaing; 17 October 1956 (age 69); Paris, France
- Education: Sciences Po; Panthéon-Assas University
- Spouse: Wilhelmine Jeanne Mathilde Elisabeth Sickinghe (m. 1984)
- Children: 3
- Parent(s): Valéry Giscard d'Estaing; Anne-Aymone Sauvage de Brantes

Henri Marie Edmond Valéry Giscard d'Estaing (born 17 October 1956) is a French businessman and son of former French President Valéry Giscard d'Estaing.

== Biography ==
Giscard d'Estaing studied at the Paris Institute of Political Studies and has a masters in economics.

He began his career with Cofremca where he served as associate director from 1982 to 1987, helping research changes in patterns of food consumption and its impacts on marketing and strategy.

In 1987 he joined the Danone Group and held various executive positions with subsidiaries such as HP Foods and Evian-Badoit.

Giscard d’Estaing joined the resort company Club Med in 1997 as chief operating officer in charge of finance, development and international relations. He became chief executive officer in 2001 and chairman in 2002. Since 2004, he has rebranded the company as upscale, but with an all-inclusive price, closing the least profitable resorts to reinvest capital back into the most profitable.

After the takeover of Club Med by Fosun International, he was named president of Club Med SAS.

== Personal life ==
He is married to jonkvrouw Wilhelmine Jeanne Mathilde Elisabeth Sickinghe (born 1956) on June 30, 1984 in Naarden, The Netherlands. The couple have three children: one son, Frédéric, and two daughters, Sophie and May.

== Ancestry ==
Ancestors of Henri Giscard d'Estaing

16. Théodore Giscard
8. Valéry Giscard
17. Marie-Anne de Lusigny
4. Edmond Giscard d'Estaing
18. Edmond Monteil
9. Louise Monteil-Ansaldi
19. Charlotte Ansaldi
2. Valéry Giscard d'Estaing
20. Agénor Bardoux
10. Jacques Bardoux
21. Clémence Villa
5. Marthe Bardoux
22. Georges Picot
11. Geneviève Georges-Picot
23. Marie Adélaïde Bachasson de Montalivet
1. Henri Giscard d'Estaing
24. Roger Sauvage de Brantes
12. Paul Sauvage de Brantes, Marquis de Brantes
25. Louise Lacuée de Cessac
6. François Sauvage de Brantes, Comte de Brantes
26. Henri Schneider
13. Marguerite Schneider
27. Eudoxie Asselin
3. Anne-Aymone Sauvage de Brantes
28. Charles de Faucigny-Lucinge et Coligny, Prince de Faucigny-Lucinge et Coligny
14. Prince Guy de Faucigny-Lucinge et Coligny
29. Françoise de Sesmaisons
7. Aymone de Faucigny-Lucinge et Coligny
30. Antonio Terry y Dorticos
15. María Natividad Dorticos y Dalton-Secor
31. Grace Dalton-Secor
