= Charlotte, Countess of Issoudun =

Charlotte
- Countess of Issoudun
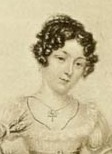
- Portrait as a child
- Born: Charlotte Marie Augustine; 13 July 1808
- Died: 13 July 1886 (aged 78); Turin, Kingdom of Italy
- Spouse: Ferdinand, 1st Prince of Faucigny-Lucinge
- Issue: Charles (1824–1910); Louis (1828–1907); Henri (1831–1899); Marguerite (1833–1921); René (1841–1911)
Names
- Charlotte Marie Augustine
- Father: Charles Ferdinand, Duke of Berry
- Mother: Amy Brown

Charlotte, Countess of Issoudun (13 July 1808 – 13 July 1886) was a French noblewoman, daughter of Prince Charles Ferdinand, Duke of Berry and Amy Brown.

== Biography ==
Charlotte's coat of arms: Azure a pairle couped between three fleurs-de-lys or, on a chief engrailed of the second three fleurs-de-lys of the first.

Charlotte was born on 13 July 1808. Her parents had met in the autumn "fall" of the previous year during performances at the London Royal Opera House. After the relationship between her parents, her sister Louise would be born. On 30 November 1809, she was baptized in Her Majesty's Catholic Chapel in London. (Note: She had already been ondoyée on 18 July 1808.)

As a consequence of the Bourbon Restoration in France, Amy Brown settled in Paris with her two daughters. On 20 February 1820, her father was the victim of an attack at the Parisian opera, being mortally wounded with a dagger by Louvel. That night, on his deathbed, he revealed to his wife, Marie Caroline of the Two-Siciles (with whom he had married in 1816 and a daughter, Louise) the existence of his two daughters with Amy Brown. His daughters went to the opera to say goodbye to their dying father and were welcomed by the Duchess de Berry, who declared that she will welcome them as daughters and watch over them. After their father's death, they lived under the protection of the French Royal family. On 9 June 1820, her great-uncle, King Louis XVIII, granted her French citizenship and the following day, the title of Countess of Issoudun and her own coat of arms. On the same day, her sister was also granted French citizenship and was ennobled with the title of Countess of Vierzon. (Note: Both noble titles were referred to cities in the old French province of Berry (as the title bore by their parent, Duke of Berry).) The monarch also personally pensioned each of the sisters.

They maintained a relationship with their father's children, Louise and Henri, Duke of Bordeaux, accompanying them at their games at the Château de Bagatelle, even having their own apartments in the château de Rosny-sur Seine, owned by the Dowager Duchess of Berry.

On 1 October 1823 in the Parisian church of Saint Louis-d'Antin, she married Ferdinand, Count (later Prince) of Faucigny-Lucinge, military officer. They had five children:

- Charles de Faucigny-Lucinge et Coligny (17 August 1824 – 11 March 1910), Prince of Lucinge and Cystria, married Françoise de Sesmaisons, the daughter of Louis, Count of Sesmaisons, and Cécile de Kergorlay. Had issue.
- Louis de Faucigny-Lucinge et Coligny (26 January 1828–1907), Prince of Lucinge and Cystria, married Henriette Victorine Marie Amanda de Mailly, the daughter of Adrien de Mailly, Prince d'Orange, Marquis of Harcourt and Nesle, and Henriette de Lonlay de Villepail. Had issue.
- Henri de Faucigny-Lucinge (26 November 1831 – 19 April 1899), Prince of Lucinge and Cystria, married Noémie Gabrielle Guillaume de Chavaudon, the daughter of Auguste Guillaume de Chavaudon, Marquis of Chavaudon, and Emilie du Hamel. Had issue.
- Marguerite Louise de Faucigny-Lucinge (9 April 1833 – 21 January 1922), Princess of Lucinge and Cystria, married Ludovico (or Lodovico) Pallavicino, Marquis of Pallavicino, an Italian politician and senator of the Kingdom of Sardinia. Had issue.
- René de Faucigny-Lucinge (4 November 1841 – 30 March 1911), Prince of Lucinge and Cystria, never married. No issue.

She died in 1886 at her family villa near Turin.

== Sources ==
- Reiset, Tony Henri Auguste, vicomte de (1905). Les enfants du Duc de Berry : d'aprés de nouveaux documents. Paris: Émile-Paul. pp. 1–161.
