= Claude Pompidou =

Wife of French President Georges Pompidou (1912–2007)

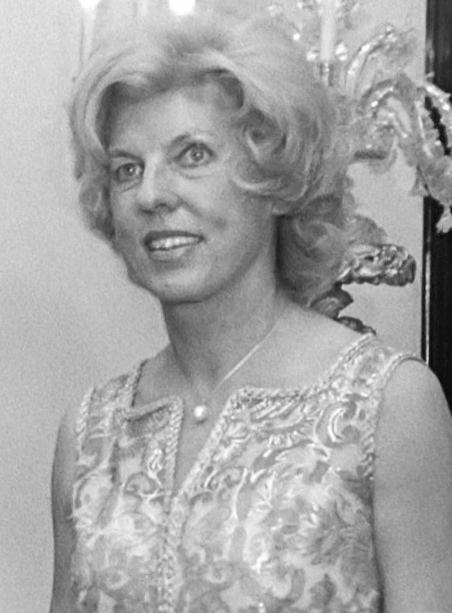

Spouse of the President of France
- In role 20 June 1969 – 2 April 1974
- President: Georges Pompidou
- Preceded by: Yvonne de Gaulle
- Succeeded by: Anne-Aymone Giscard d'Estaing

Personal details
- Born: Claude Jacqueline Cahour; 13 November 1912 Château-Gontier, Mayenne, France
- Died: 3 July 2007 (aged 94) Paris, France
- Resting place: Orvilliers Cimetiere; Orvilliers, France
- Spouse: Georges Pompidou (m. 1935; died 1974)
- Children: Alain Pompidou

Claude Jacqueline Pompidou (née Cahour; 13 November 1912 – 3 July 2007) was the wife of President of France Georges Pompidou. She was a philanthropist and a patron of modern art, especially through the Centre Georges Pompidou.

== Early life ==
Claude Jacqueline Cahour was born in Château-Gontier, Mayenne, one of two daughters of a doctor. Her mother died when she was three years old.

She moved to Paris to study law and met Georges Pompidou, her future husband, during the first year of her studies; he was then working as a literature teacher at a lycée. The couple married in 1935, and their adopted son, Alain Pompidou, was born in 1942.

Her husband Georges fought in the Battle of France in World War II, before resuming his career as a teacher. He joined the staff of Charles de Gaulle after the Liberation of France, then later joined de Rothschild Frères as a banker in 1953 and became general manager of a bank in 1956.

== Political life ==
De Gaulle appointed Georges Pompidou as Prime Minister of France in 1962, and he served until 1968. The couple did not move to the Prime Minister's official residence at the Hôtel Matignon, instead staying in their apartment in Quai de Béthune on Île Saint-Louis. While Georges Pompidou won public acclaim for his handling of the May 1968 civil unrest, it caused friction with de Gaulle, leading to his resignation as prime minister once the crisis had passed.

Georges Pompidou ran for the presidency in 1969 and was elected, but Mme Pompidou did not enjoy political life, once calling the Élysée Palace a "house of sadness". The couple redecorated its rooms in the modern style with painted aluminium walls, colourful carpets by Yaacov Agam, and soft furnishings by Pierre Paulin. Mme Pompidou was also noted for her interest in fashion. Her husband died in office in 1974, and the daring decorations were removed by the next President, Valéry Giscard d'Estaing.

== Philanthropy and the Pompidou Centre ==
In 1970, Mme Pompidou set up the Claude Pompidou Foundation to help disabled children, the elderly, and hospitalised. Jacques Chirac served as the treasurer of the Foundation for over three decades. Following the death of Mme Pompidou, Chirac's wife Bernadette Chirac became the president of the Foundation.

Claude Pompidou also played a key role in establishing the Centre Georges Pompidou. The building was designed by Italian architect Renzo Piano and British architect Richard Rogers (though, it is said that Georges Pompidou didn't approve of the choice of the jury who picked up Piano and Rogers, and that he would have preferred a more classic architecture). Pompidou's choice of artwork for the Centre was based largely on her knowledge of her husband's tastes: she was particularly inspired by the work of Yves Klein. Pompidou continued to play an active role in French artistic life in subsequent decades, and also played an active role in the foundation.

== Later life and death ==
In 1997, Claude Pomidou published her memoirs, L’Élan du Coeur (The Momentum of the Heart).

In 2007, she died in Paris at age 94, and the funeral service was held in the Saint-Louis-en-l'Île church; among those in attendance were French President Nicolas Sarkozy, former president Jacques Chirac, Queen and Empress of Iran Farah Pahlavi, Princess Caroline of Monaco, writer Maurice Druon, and businesswoman Liliane Bettencourt.

Unofficial roles
Preceded by Yvonne de Gaulle	Spouse of the President of France; 1969–1974	Succeeded by Anne-Aymone Giscard d'Estaing
