= Amy Brown (royal mistress) =

Mistress of Charles Ferdinand, Duke of Berry

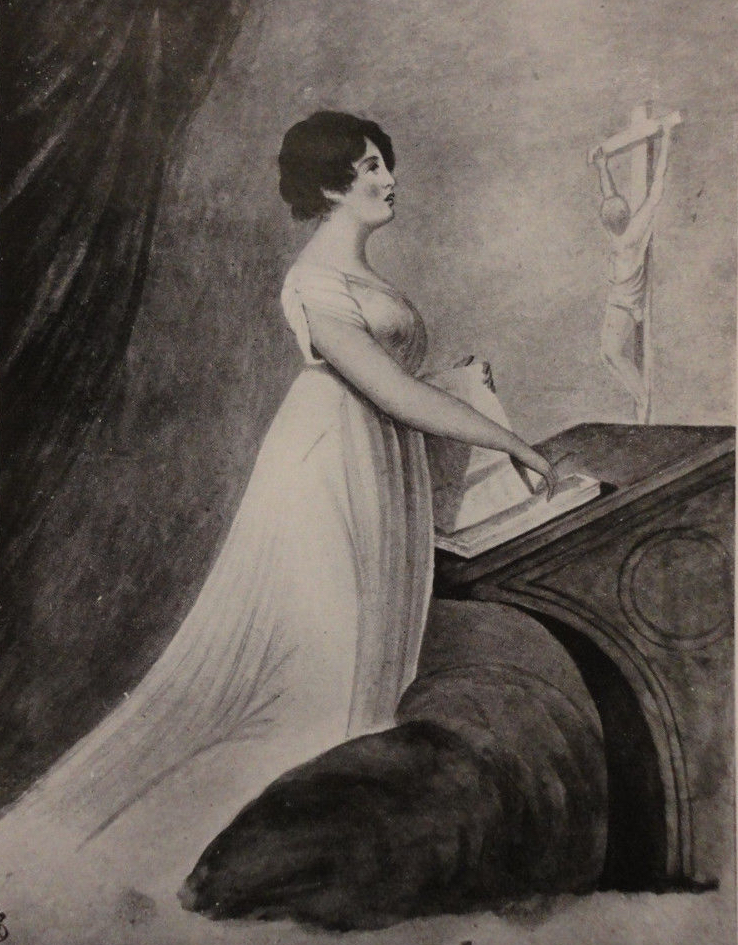
- Born: 8 April 1783; Maidstone, Kent, England
- Died: 7 May 1876 (aged 93); Chateau de La Contrie, France
- Spouses: Mr. Freeman; Charles Ferdinand, Duke of Berry (alleged)
- Issue: Georgina Emma Marshall; George Granville Brown; John Freeman; Robert Freeman; Charlotte Marie de Bourbon, Comtesse d'Issoudun; Louise Marie de Bourbon, Comtesse de Vierzon
- Father: John L. Brown
- Mother: Mary Ann Deacon

Amy Brown (8 April 1783 – 7 May 1876) was the English mistress of Charles Ferdinand, Duke of Berry, younger son of King Charles X of France and Marie Thérèse of Savoy. Some authors have stated that they married in a secret ceremony which was conducted in England by her father, a Protestant pastor, but there is no evidence of it. Together they had two daughters; however, when he returned to France, he was constrained to put an end to his relationship for reasons of state.

== Early years ==
Amy Brown was born on 8 April 1783, the fifth child of eight born to John L. (in other sources named Joseph) Brown, a Protestant pastor, and his wife Mary Ann Deacon. By 1793, Amy's four older siblings had died in infancy or early youth, and thus she became the eldest surviving child of her parents.

On 10 January 1804 Amy gave birth to a daughter, named Georgina Emma Marshall. Her second child, a son named Georges Granville Brown, was born on 20 February 1805 and ten months later, on 25 December, a third child, another son named John Freeman was also born. Apparently this last child was born in a legitimate marriage with a certain Mr. Freeman. Nothing further is recorded of her husband or his subsequent fate; however, author David Skuy describes Amy as having been a widow when she first met the duke.

== The Duke of Berry ==
Amy met Charles Ferdinand, Duke of Berry in 1805 in London, three years after the Bourbon royal family was exiled to England. As her son had been born in December of that year, it was likely that they had first met while she was pregnant, although the exact date of their meeting is not known. In late 1806 or early 1807, Amy gave birth to another son, named Robert Freeman; his surname established that Amy's husband appears as the official father, although it is probable that the Duke of Berry was the biological father of both John and Robert Freeman, but never recognised them. Robert died young, in 1823.

Amy perhaps married Charles Ferdinand in a secret ceremony conducted by her father in 1806, without the duke having first obtained permission from his family and ignoring the fact that as a non-Catholic, no son of Amy's could ever ascend the French throne. As it turned out, they did not have a son (with the controversial exception of John and Robert Freeman), although Amy bore the duke two daughters:

- Charlotte Marie Augustine de Bourbon, Countess d'Issoudun, married in 1823 Ferdinand de Faucigny-Lucinge, Prince of Lucinge, with whom she had issue. She is an ancestress of Anne-Aymone Giscard d'Estaing, president Valéry Giscard d'Estaing's wife.
- Louise Marie Charlotte de Bourbon, Countess de Vierzon, married in 1827 Charles de Charette de La Contrie, Baron de La Contrie, by whom she had issue. She is an ancestress of French minister Hervé de Charette. Her son Athanase-Charles-Marie Charette de la Contrie was a general and military commander.

After receiving the news of Napoleon's abdication, the duke returned to France in 1814, taking his daughters with him. Amy remained behind in England. Upon his return, he was constrained to separate Amy for political reasons. If it was real, the marriage was declared invalid due to the lack of royal consent to the match, and therefore the official position was that Amy had never been his wife at all but rather his mistress. He subsequently married Maria Carolina (5 November 1798 – 17 April 1870), eldest daughter of King Francis I of the Two Sicilies, by whom he had four children, including Henri, Comte de Chambord, Legitimist pretender to the throne of France. He also fathered two illegitimate sons by dancer Eugénie-Virginie Oreille (8 August 1795 – October 1875), who was one of his many mistresses. The duke was assassinated by a saddler, Louis Pierre Louvel on 14 February 1820; while he lay dying, the duke asked to see Amy and his daughters, entrusting them to the care of his wife, who afterwards adopted the two girls.

== Death and legacy ==
Amy's son by her first marriage, John Freeman died 26 August 1866 in Zurich, Switzerland; and Amy herself died on 7 May 1876 at the age of ninety-three at the Chateau de La Contrie, France. Through her daughter, the Baronne de Charette, Amy is the ancestress of Hervé de Charette (born 30 July 1938) the French foreign minister from 1995 to 1997

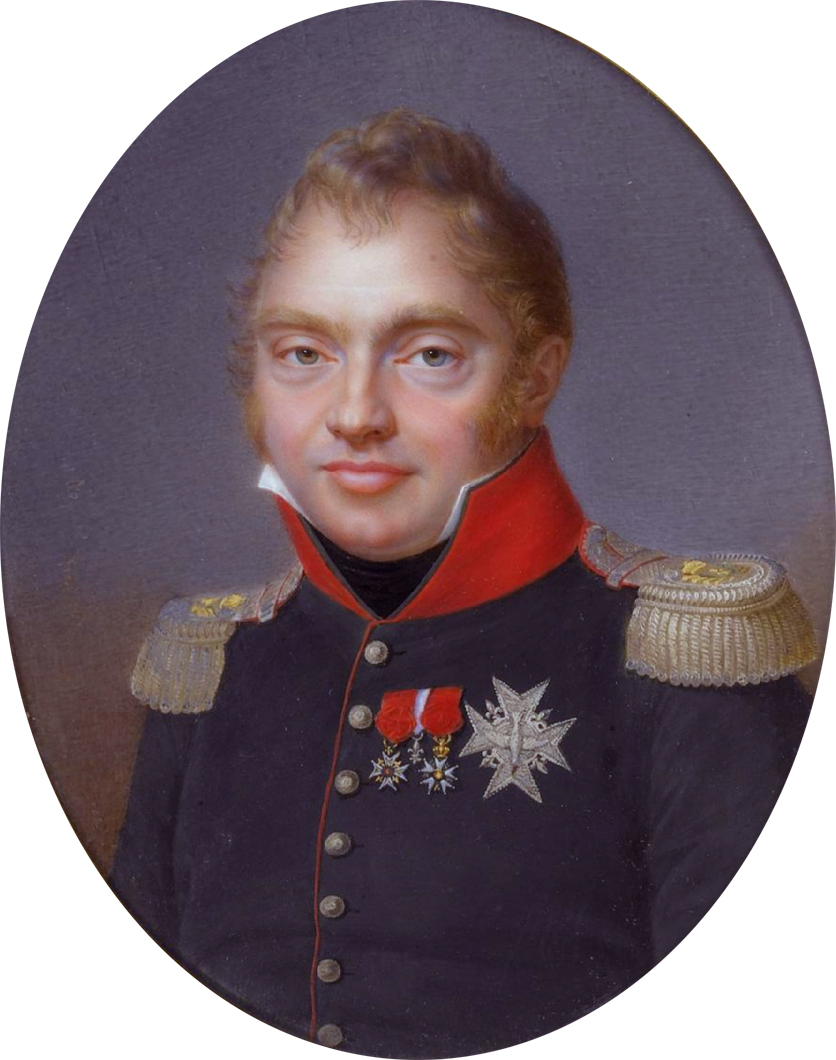
Charles Ferdinand, Duke of Berry, lover of Amy Brown

== See also ==
- fr:Freeman de Bourbon
