= Château de Brantes =

Château in Provence-Alpes-Côte d'Azur, France

Coordinates: 44.0005°N 4.8773°E

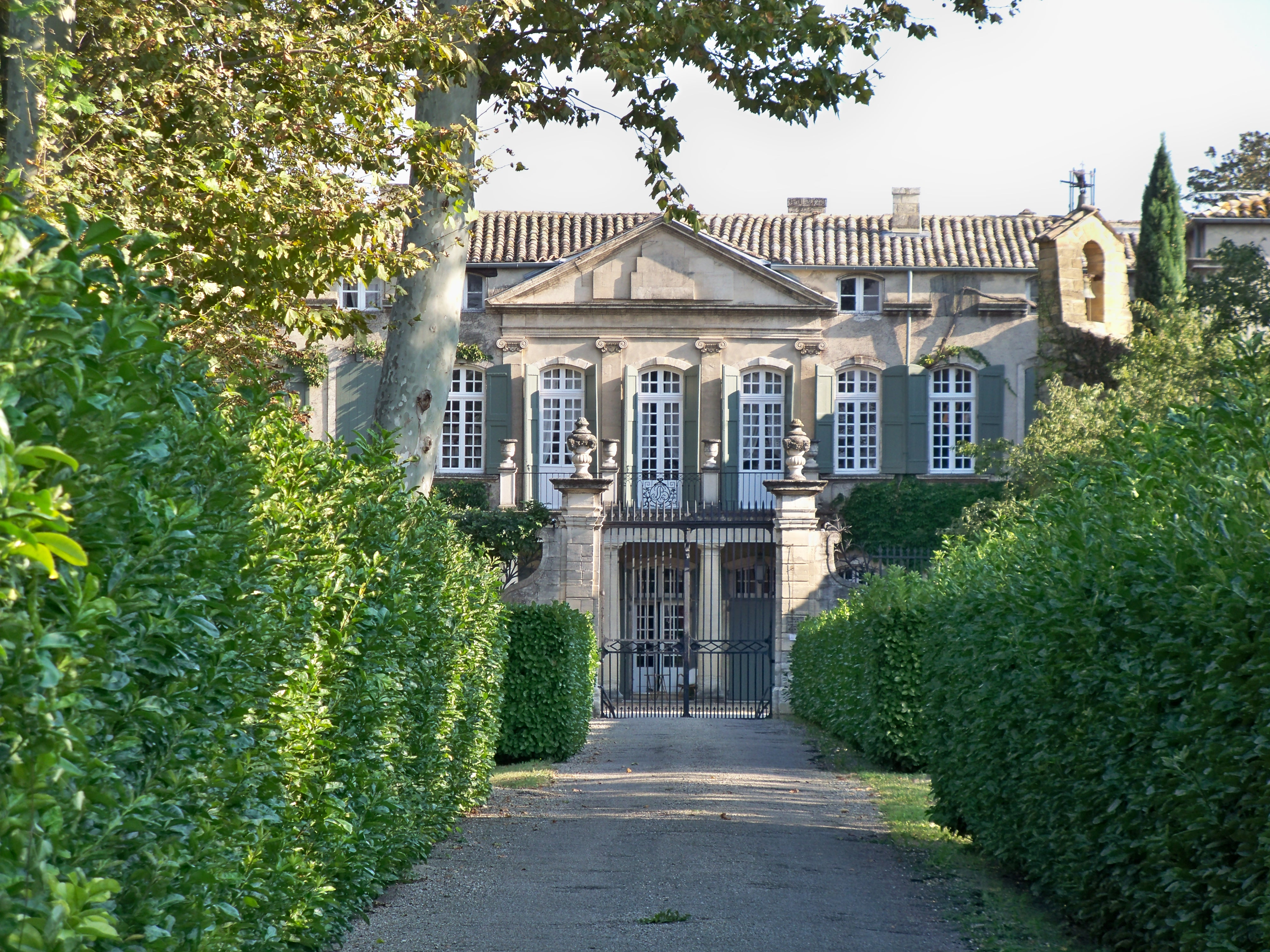
Chateau de Brantes

The Château de Brantes is an 18th-century manor house with a contemporary garden inspired by the gardens of Tuscany, located in the town of Sorgues in the Vaucluse Department of France. The gardens are classified by the French Ministry of Culture among the Remarkable Gardens of France.

== Description ==
The garden, 1.1 hectares in area, is enclosed by a wall of stones. It features a Magnolia grandiflora tree that is 200 years old, one of the oldest in Europe, Lagerstroemia trees a hundred years old, and a plantation of plane trees dating to 1816. Flowers include plantings of peony, rose, agapanthia and althea.

== History ==
The house was built in 1700 by Pierre del Bianco, the marquis de Brantes, the paymaster for the soldiers of the papal state of Avignon. It was enlarged in 1816 by General de Cessac, a minister of Emperor Napoleon I, and by his wife Sibylle de Brantes, who created the park. The park was restored and the contemporary garden begun in 1956 by Louis and Madelaine de Brantes, the parents of the current owner of the chateau.
