= Laurence Vichnievsky =

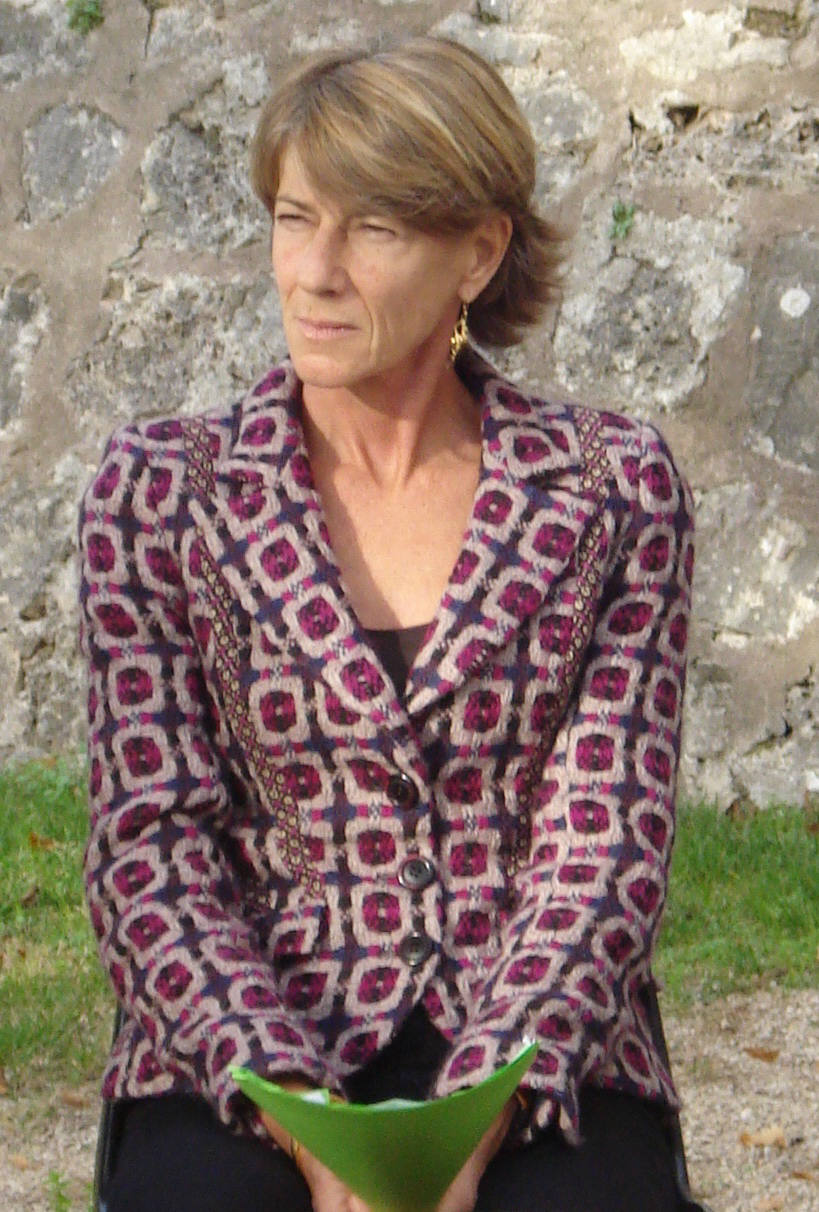

Member of the Constitutional Council
- Incumbent
- Assumed office 8 March 2025
- President: Richard Ferrand
- Preceded by: Corinne Luquiens

Member of the National Assembly for Puy-de-Dôme's 3rd constituency
- In office 21 June 2017 – 9 June 2024
- Preceded by: Danielle Auroi
- Succeeded by: Nicolas Bonnet

Personal details
- Born: 5 February 1955 (age 71) Boulogne-Billancourt, France
- Party: EELV (2010-2015); MoDem (since 2015)

Laurence Vichnievsky (born 5 February 1955 in Boulogne-Billancourt, Hauts-de-Seine) is a French magistrate and politician who has been serving as a member of the Constitutional Council since 2025. She previously member of the French National Assembly Between 2017–2024. She is a member of the Democratic Movement (MoDem), after having previously been a member of Europe Écologie–The Greens.

== Early career ==
Vichnievsky became judge in Colombes in 1979 before becoming judge in Paris, notably being in charge of the Robert Boulin murder case. Along with Eva Joly, she became the lead magistrate in the Elf affair, the Dumas affair and the Taiwan frigates affairs.

== Political career ==
Along with Joly, Vichnievsky joined the Europe Écologie movement. She was selected to be Europe Écologie–The Greens' candidate in the Provence-Alpes-Côte d'Azur for the 2010 regional elections. As a consequence, she had to relinquish her position as advocate general in the Erika maritime pollution appeal case and no longer handled major criminal cases.

During a 2011 party congress, Vichnievsky was appointed spokesperson of the Europe Écologie–The Greens national executive board but resigned soon after amid disagreements over pension policy with Joly and Cécile Duflot.

In the 2015 regional elections, Vichnievsky was reelected on the list of MoDem.

In the 2017 national elections, Vichnievsky became a member of the National Assembly. In parliament, she has since been serving on the Committee on Legal Affairs. In addition to her committee assignments, she is also one of six Assembly members who serve as judges of the Cour de Justice de la République.

As member of the Committee on Legal Affairs, Vichnievsky authored an amendment to a 2020 security law, in which she sought to limit public authorities' ability to subcontract security services.

After losing her seat in the 2024 French legislative election, She was appointed by President of the National Assembly Yaël Braun-Pivet to a seat on the Constitutional Council.
