= Nicolas Bonnet (politician) =

French politician (born 1981)

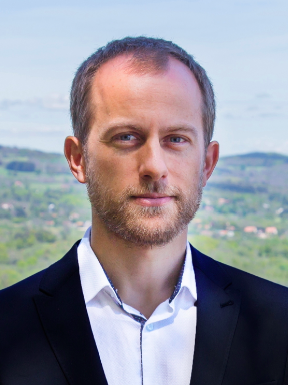
- Bonnet in 2017

Member of the French National Assembly for Puy-de-Dôme's 3rd constituency
- Incumbent
- Assumed office 18 July 2024
- Preceded by: Laurence Vichnievsky

Personal details
- Born: 11 February 1981 (age 44)
- Political party: The Ecologists (since 2006)

Nicolas Bonnet (born 11 February 1981) is a French politician of The Ecologists who was elected member of the National Assembly for Puy-de-Dôme's 3rd constituency in 2024. He is the deputy mayor of Clermont-Ferrand, and was a candidate for the constituency in 2017 and 2022.
