= Santa Maria della Carità, Naples =

Church building in Naples, Italy

Coordinates: 40.844510°N 14.248640°E

Santa Maria della Carità (also called La Giorgia) is a church located on Piazza Carità in Naples, Italy.

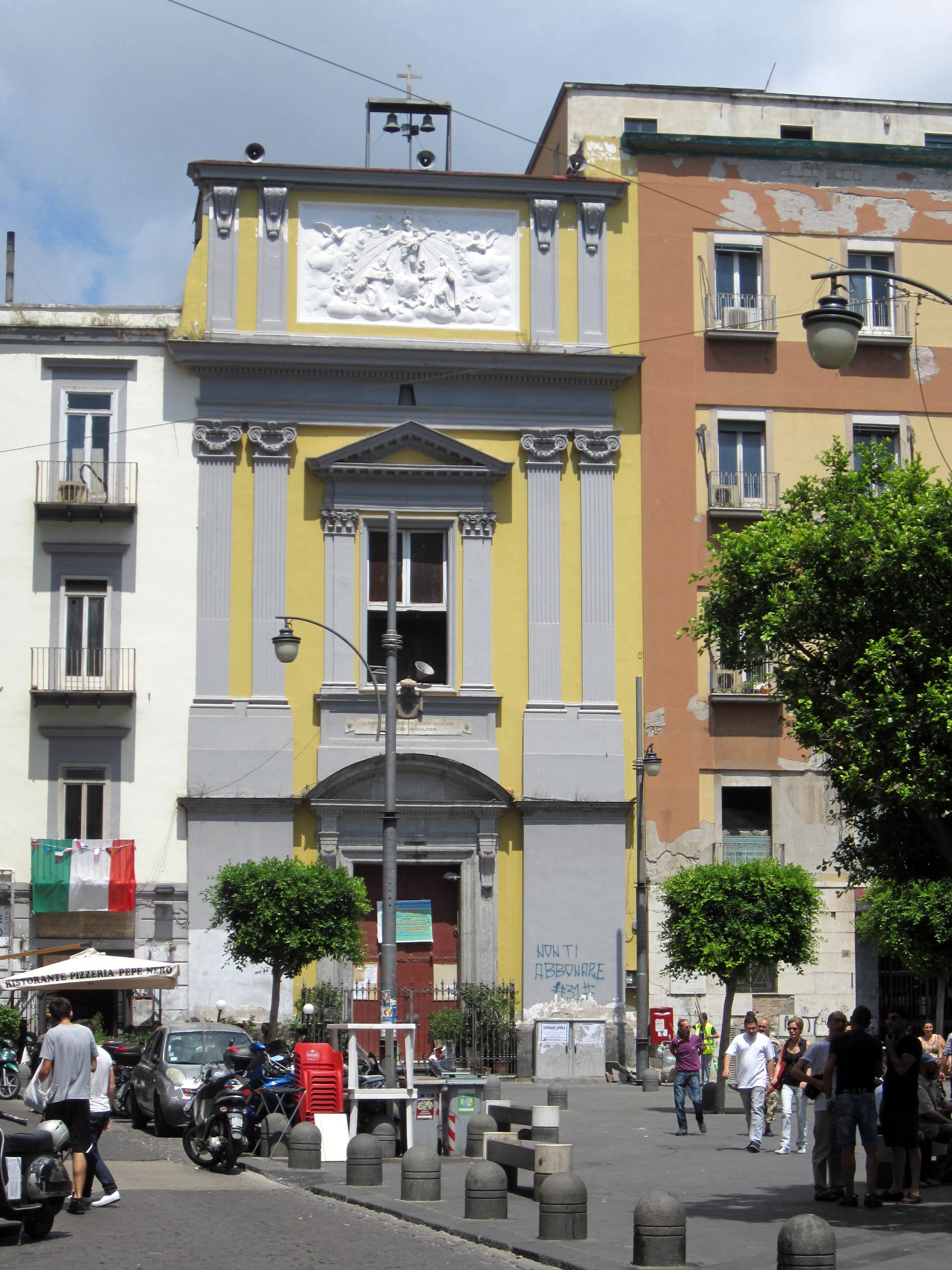
Façade

== History ==
The church was founded in the 16th century, circa the plague year of 1550 or just before. It was attached in 1627 to the Pii Operai Catechisti Rurali who abandoned the building in 1633, when their founder, Carlo Carafa died and the building was transferred to a Congregation of Nobili (aristocrats). The church and conservatory were suppressed during the Napoleonic occupation. Reopened in 1823, with the nickname of la Giorgia, and was transferred to the care of the Congregation of the Rosary. The church was reconstructed in the 19th century, and in so, destroyed many of the frescoes of Andrea Malinconico. Also lost was an altarpiece of the Holy Family by Giulio Romano given to the church by Pope Paul III. A fire in 1960 further destroyed part of the church and paintings.

== Bibliography ==
- Gennaro Aspreno Galante, Le Chiese di Napoli. Guida sacra della città di Napoli, 19th century.
