= Alfonso Balzico =

Italian sculptor (1825–1901)

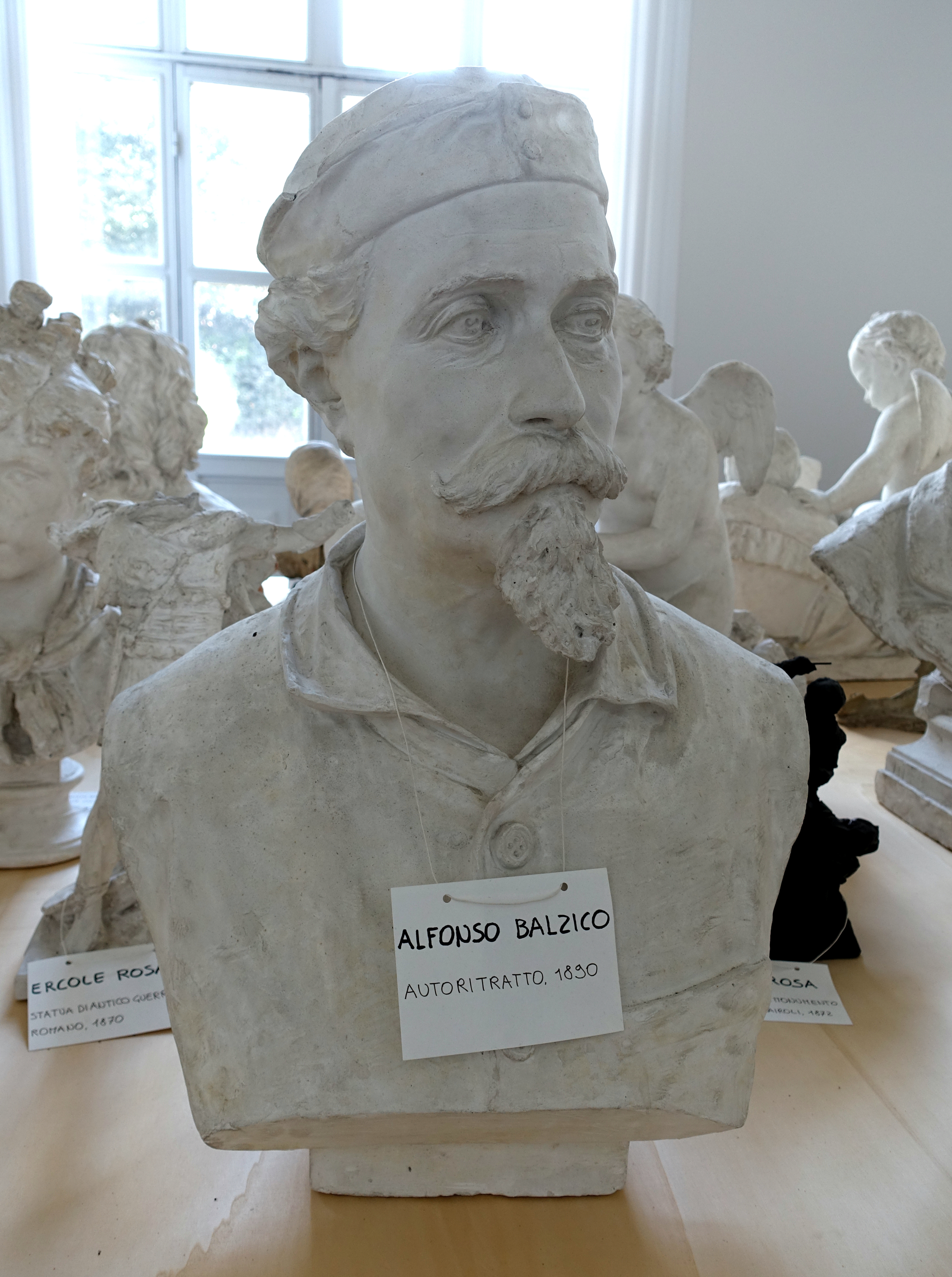
- Self-portrait by Alfonso Balzico, 1890
- Born: 18 October 1825; Cava de' Tirreni, Kingdom of the Two Sicilies
- Died: 3 February 1901 (aged 75); Rome, Kingdom of Italy
- Occupation: Sculptor

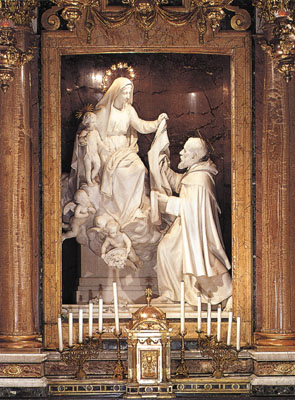
Statue of the Virgin Mary giving the Scapular to St Simon Stock, Santa Maria della Vittoria, Rome, by Alfonso Balzico, 19th century

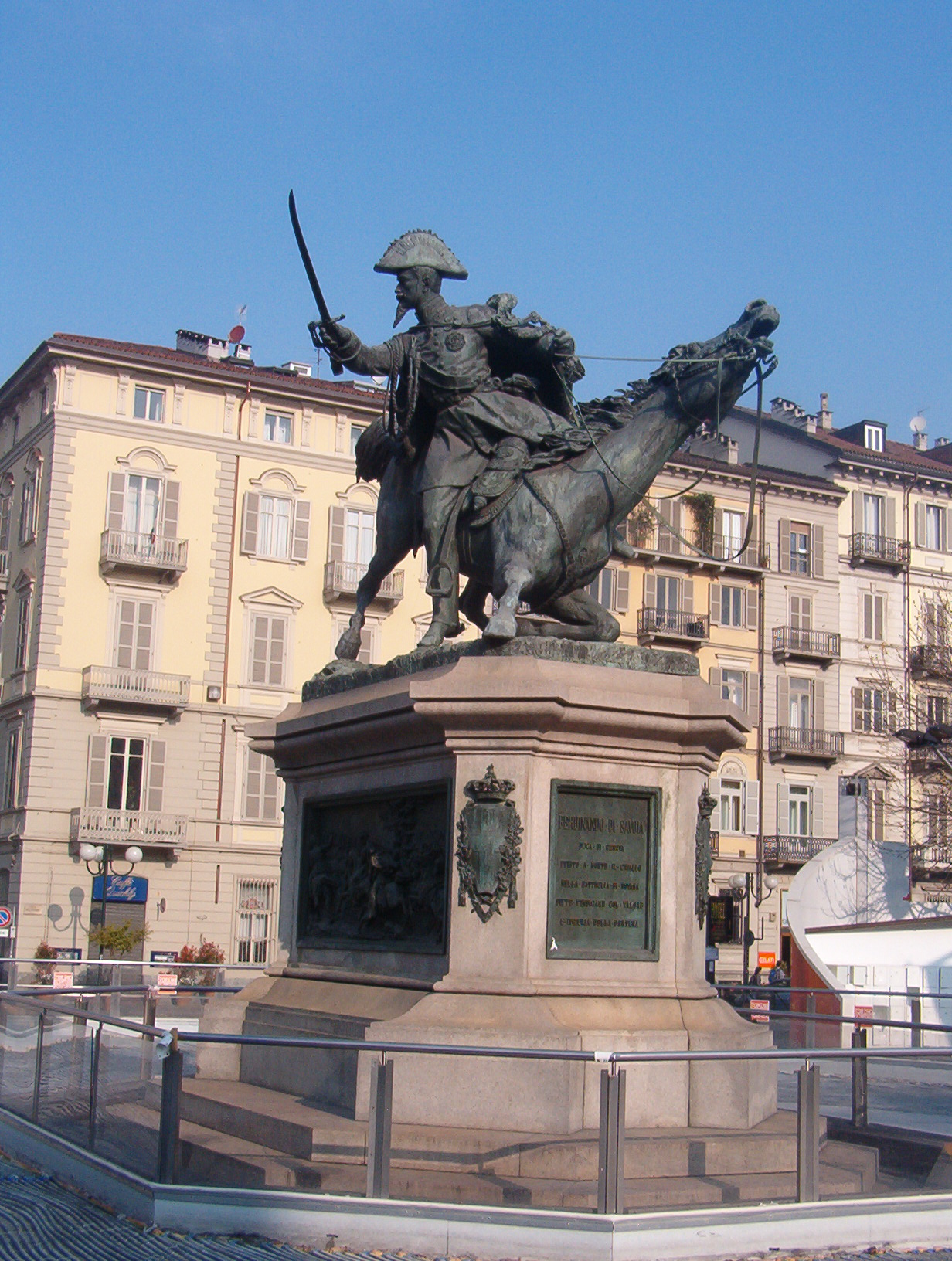
Statue of Ferdinand of Savoy, Turin

Alfonso Balzico (18 October 1825 – 3 February 1901) was an Italian sculptor. He was born in Cava de' Tirreni, near Salerno in Italy and died in Rome.

== Biography ==
After completing studies in literature, he began sculpting in wood, then marble, and was then awarded a stipend to study at the Academy of the Arts in Naples. In Naples, he won a silver medal and a further award for his submission of a clay model of Procris dying in the Arms of Cephalus, which he presented to the Provincial Council of Salerno. Another prize was awarded to his bas-relief of Angel escorts St Peter out of Prison. He then went to Rome and finished a Flavio Gioia, Return of Dinah and Jacob, a St John the Baptist, a Virgin of the Purity, and a Noli me tangere.

He then traveled to Milan and Florence in 1858 and 1860, where his views turned away from Neoclassicism towards realism and romanticism. He returned to Naples, but his works attracted the attention of Victor Emmanuel II, the King of Italy. He sculpted statues depicting the Naive and the Poor; Revenge; and an Owl. He moved to Turin, where he was commissioned a monument to Massimo d'Azeglio as well as a highly dynamic equestrian monument to Prince Ferdinando, Duke of Genoa, where the Prince attempts to stand up in mid-battle, while his wounded horse falls. He also sculpted a Cleopatra, and helped design coins and medals. He painted several portraits and sculpted busts of the Crown Prince of Portugal, Prince Napoleon, and Costantino Nigra. In 1866, he became the sculptor of the House of Savoy. In 1875, he went to Rome, and in 1900, his statue of Flavio Gioja won the gold medal at the Exposition Universelle, Paris, one year before his death.
