= Princess Cécile Marie of Bourbon-Parma =

French humanitarian and political activist (1935–2021)

Cécile Marie of Bourbon-Parma
- Countess of Poblet
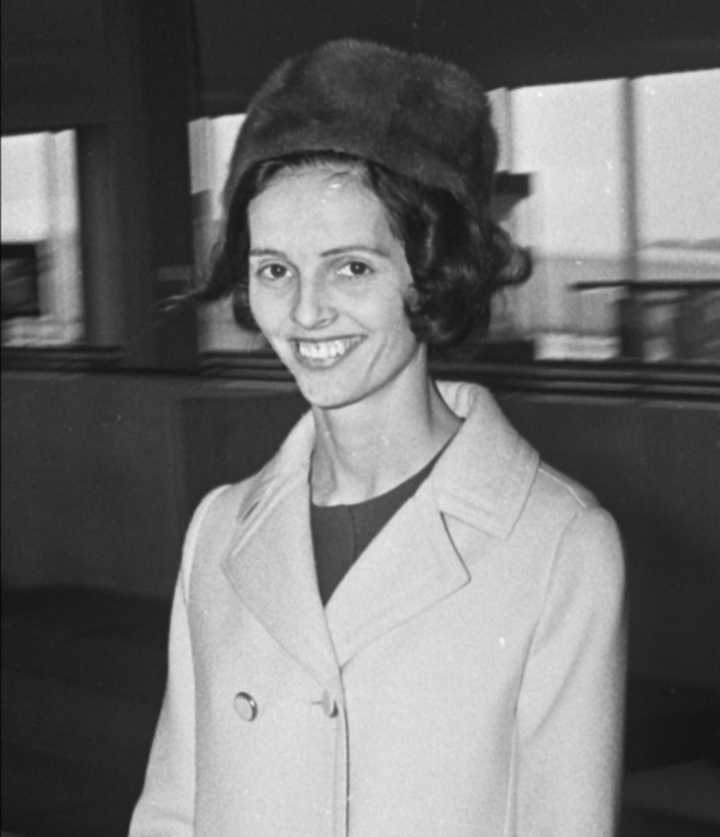
- Princess Cécile in 1968
- Born: 12 April 1935; Paris, France
- Died: 1 September 2021 (aged 86); Hôpital Broca, Paris, France
- Burial: Sanctuary of Santa Maria della Steccata, Parma
Names
- French: Cécile Marie Antoinette Madeleine Jeanne Agnès Françoise de Bourbon-Parme; Spanish: Cecilia María Antonieta Magdalena Juana Inés Francisca de Borbón-Parma; Italian: Cecilia Maria Antonietta Maddalena Giovanna Agnese Francesca di Borbone-Parma
- House: Bourbon-Parma
- Father: Prince Xavier, Duke of Parma and Piacenza
- Mother: Madeleine de Bourbon-Busset
- Occupation: Humanitarian, political activist

Princess Cécile Marie Antoinette Madeleine Jeanne Agnès Françoise of Bourbon-Parma, Countess of Poblet (Spanish: Cecilia María de Borbón-Parma, French: Cécile Marie de Bourbon-Parme; 12 April 1935 – 1 September 2021) was a French humanitarian and political activist. A Carlist, she supported the claims of her father, Prince Xavier, Duke of Parma and Piacenza, to the headship of the House of Bourbon-Parma and his claim to the Spanish throne. She later supported the claim of her older brother, Prince Carlos Hugo, Duke of Parma and his progressive reforms to Carlist ideology over that of her younger brother Prince Sixtus Henry, Duke of Aranjuez's claims and traditionalist stance. An anti-fascist, she opposed the dictatorship of Francisco Franco and was expelled from Spain multiple times for working to promote democratic reforms. During her exile, she made connections in French intellectual circles and attending the 1973 World Congress of Peace Forces and 1974 Berlin Conference. She was present, along with some of her siblings, at the Montejurra massacre in 1976.

Princess Cécile was very involved in humanitarian and religious causes. A trained pilot, she volunteered with the Sovereign Military Order of Malta during the Nigerian Civil War to fly in resources and provide humanitarian aid. Through the United Nations, she worked with the Food and Agriculture Organization in Laos, helped victims of floods in Vallès, and worked as a nurse in a leper colony in Marina Alta. Towards the end of her life, she lived in Paris and was a volunteer with the International Association for Hospice and Palliative Care.

== Early life and family ==
Princess Cécile Marie was born on 12 April 1935 as the fourth children and third daughter of Prince Xavier of Bourbon-Parma, Duke of Parma and Piacenza, the Carlist claimant to the Spanish throne and Head of the House of Bourbon-Parma, and his wife Madeleine de Bourbon-Busset, the daughter of the Count de Lignières and a member of a cadet branch of the House of Bourbon. She was the younger sister of Princess Marie-Françoise, Prince Carlos Hugo, and Princess Marie-Thérèse and an older sister of Princess Marie des Neiges and Prince Sixtus Henry. She was also a niece of the last Austrian Empress Zita of Bourbon-Parma.

Princess Cécile was educated in the United States, Quebec, and in Allier before finishing her studies at the Institut Catholique de Paris. She then studied political law at the Sorbonne University in Paris and at the Complutense University of Madrid.

Her father bestowed her with the title Countess of Poblet. During her youth, the Princess was active in society: on 22 April 1955, she was presented as a debutante at a coming out ball hosted by her parents at the Hôtel Ritz Paris. She also attended events such as a reception and party at the Hotel Wellington in Madrid in 1959 or the Paris Ball held at the French Embassy in Brussels in 1960.

== Activism ==
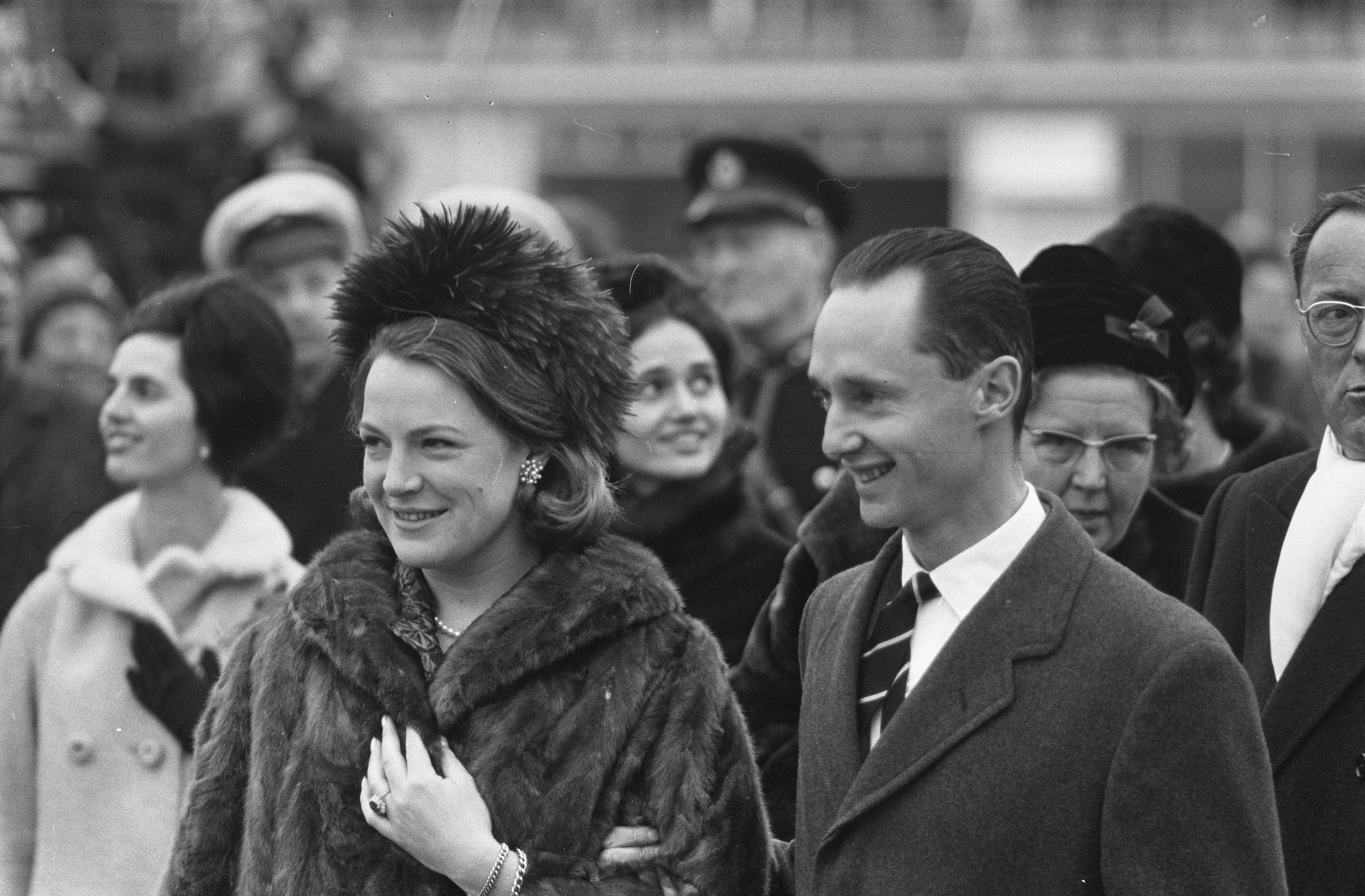
Princess Cécile Marie (first from left in the second row), with Princess Marie-Thérèse, Prince Carlos Hugo and Princess Irene of the Netherlands; 1964.

Princess Cécile Marie accompanied her father on a trip to Spain in 1951, and then in 1955 she revisited the country with her sisters Marie-Thérèse and Marie des Neiges, as their first visits to the country to begin to learn about Carlism. In 1956, she moved to Spain, taking charge of the private political secretariat for the Carlists. She was present, along with some of her siblings, at the Montejurra massacre on 9 May 1976.

After her father, who assumed the title Duke of Parma and the role as head of the House of Bourbon-Parma from his nephew, Robert Hugo, Duke of Parma, ceded his role to his oldest son, Prince Carlos Hugo, a political rift occurred in the family. Princess Cécile, Princess Marie Thérèse, and Princess Marie des Neiges supported new progressive Carlist ideologies and the claim of their brother while Princess Marie Françoise, Prince Sixtus Henry, and their mother opposed the claim and political and ideological reforms. Described by her family as a "Carlist militant" and a "tireless fighter", she was active in Spanish political reforms throughout the 1960s and 1970s. She was expelled from Francoist Spain on several occasions due to her political activism and anti-fascist views, as she worked to recover democratic freedoms that had been taken away by the dictatorship.

In September 1962 there were heavy floods in Catalonia, Spain, known as the 1962 Vallés floods, which caused a lot of damage to the population, as well as many deaths. Princess Cécile Marie helped with rescue efforts.

The Princess carried on the activities of the Carlist dynasty of Spain also by traveling and making carlism known to other Spanish cities: she visited numerous Spanish cities as an Carlist Infanta of Spain: in 1963 she was in Banyoles, where she took part in carlist events and to others: she attended an exhibition of the main local industrial and agricultural products, visited the city's Archaeological Museum and was invited by the Traditionalist Community to lunch. In September of the same year she began a visit to various areas of Spain with her sister Marie-Thérèse, and this was seen as a move by the Bourbon-Parma family aimed at the Franco regime who was starting to think about naming Prince Juan Carlos (son of another pretender to the Spanish throne, Infante Juan, Count of Barcelona) as heir to the throne: that the Bourbon-Parma family would not give up their claim to the throne of Spain despite the wedding of Prince Juan Carlos and Princess Sophia of Greece, which took place the year before, in May 1962.

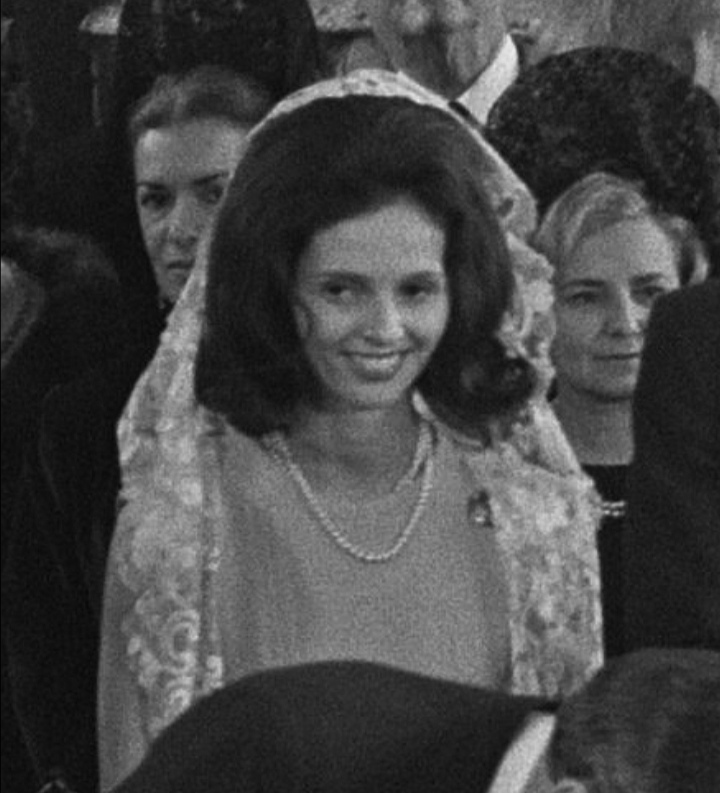
Princess Cécile Marie at the baptism of her nephew Prince Carlos, Duke of Parma, in France; 1970

From the 1960s she was a member of Caritas Spain, with the aim of helping the poorest Spaniards and Carlists in need. Princess Cécile worked as a nurse at the Fontilles leper colony in Marina Alta, volunteered to help victims of the floods in Vallès, and worked for the Food and Agriculture Organization in Laos. When the Nigerian Civil War began in 1967, she volunteered with the Sovereign Military Order of Malta as a pilot, flying into the country to bring humanitarian aid. She had previously trained as a pilot and skydiver. She rescued orphaned children during the war and distributed food, flying between Biafra and Libreville. Princess Cécile was awarded the Cross of the Order pro Merito Melitensi by the Sovereign Military Order of Malta for her humanitarian work during the Nigerian Civil War. She returned to Spain after the war but was expelled by Francisco Franco in 1971.

While in exile, she and her sisters, Marie Thérèse and Marie des Neiges, were active in the Exterior Front of the Carlist Party. She made contacts with various intellectuals while exiled in France including Marcel Niedergang, André Malraux, Louis Leprince-Ringuet, Gaston Monnerville, Bishop Daniel Pézeril, and Manuel Azcárate.

She attended the 1973 World Congress of Peace Forces in Moscow and attended an ecumenical meeting sponsored by Patriarch Pimen I of Moscow. In 1974, she attended the Berlin Conference, a progressive Catholic conference. Princess Cécile Marie did her best regarding the situation of the Vietnam War, which ended in 1975: she took part in demonstrations for human rights and against the war, together with her friend, the economist John Kenneth Galbraith. In 1977, she authored a book, "Diccionario del carlismo" (in Spanish), who talk about carlism and its changes during the time. She was allowed to return to Spain in November 1977 where she settled to help her brother Carlos Hugo in managing Carlism.

She was also passionate about Catholic theology and archiving. She lived her last years in Paris, where she volunteered with the International Association for Hospice and Palliative Care.

== Last years, death and burial ==
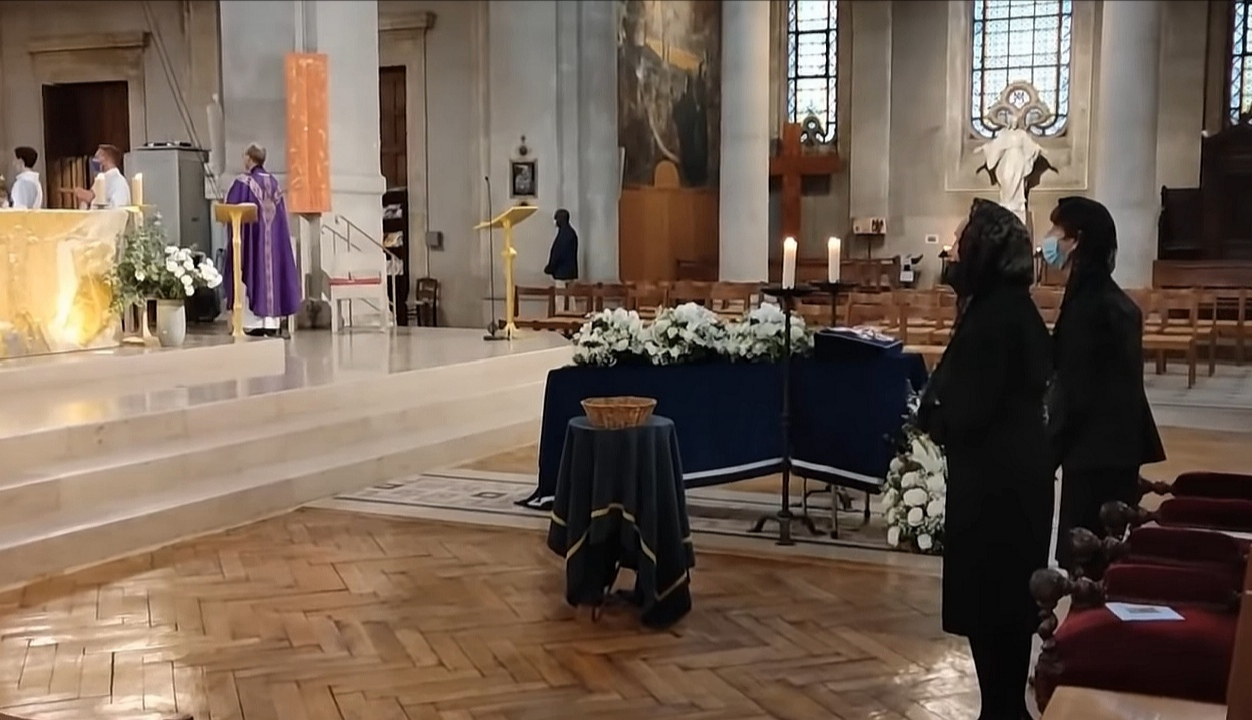
Princesses Marie-Françoise and Marie des Neiges at Princess Cécile's funeral mass; 10 September 2021

In addition to Carlist activities, in her last years Cécile Marie also took part in events related to the Royal and Ducal House of Bourbon-Parma: on 5 April 2014, she acted as godmother at the baptism of Princess Cecilia Maria of Bourbon-Parma, the daughter of her nephew. In July of the same year, during an interview with a French newspaper, Cécile Marie spoke about her sister Marie Thérèse, when asked why her sister had never married, Cécile Marie stated that "she has a very high standard. If she were presented with an opportunity, she would have seized it. But nothing in line with her aspirations has come to distract her from her cult of independence." In 2016 Cécile Marie returned to Parma, where she had already been in 2014 and 2012, to attend the baptism of Prince Carlos Enrique of Bourbon-Parma, third child of the Duke of Parma. On that occasion the Princess was photographed while being helped to walk by her sisters Marie Thérèse and Marie des Neiges and by her nephew Prince Charles-Henri de Lobkowicz, who represented Princess Marie Françoise. In the same year she visited the ancient ducal lands, and in particular the city of Fontanellato, where she was received by the mayor, Francesco Trivelloni.

In 2018, Cécile Marie and her sisters Marie Thérèse and Marie des Neiges reconciled with their older sister, Marie Françoise, with whom they had come into conflict because of their different views on Carlism. The sisters spent a lot of time together after reconciling.

In the last years of her life, Princess Cécile Marie suffered from several diseases that led her to be cared for by her sisters and a nurse. In particular, she suffered from an important and serious illness which kept her confined to her home in the last years of her life. Princess Cécile Marie died in the Broca hospital in Paris on 1 September 2021, five days after she attended the funeral of her sister Princess Marie Thérèse. Her death was announced in an official statement made by her nephew, Prince Carlos, Duke of Parma. A Catholic funeral was held at the Notre-Dame-des-Champs, Paris on 10 September 2021. The funeral mass was attended by members of her family including Prince Carlos, Duke of Parma and Piacenza; Prince Jaime, Count of Bardi; Princess Margarita, Countess of Colorno; Princess Carolina, Marchioness of Sala; Princess Marie-Françoise, Princess Edouard de Lobkowicz; Princess Marie des Neiges, Countess of Castillo de La Mota; Prince Amaury of Bourbon-Parma and Prince Charles-Henri de Lobkowicz. Finally, she was cremated, and her remains were buried in the family crypt in Sanctuary of Santa Maria della Steccata in Parma, Italy, on 18 March 2022.

== Ancestry ==
Ancestors of Princess Cécile Marie of Bourbon-Parma

Charles III, Duke of Parma
Robert I, Duke of Parma
Princess Louise of Artois
Xavier, Duke of Parma
Miguel I of Portugal
Infanta Maria Antonia of Portugal
Princess Adelaide of Löwenstein-Wertheim-Rosenberg
Cécile Marie of Bourbon-Parma
Henri de Bourbon, comte de Lignières
Georges de Bourbon, comte de Lignières
Adrienne de Mailly de Nesle
Madeleine de Bourbon-Busset
René de Kerret, vicomte de Quillien
Marie Jeanne de Kerret de Quillien
Marie Léonie Gautier

== Honours ==
- Duchy of Parma:
  - Senator Grand Cross with necklace of the Angelic Imperial Holy Constantinian Order of St. George
  - Grand Cross of the Ducal Royal Order of Saint Louis
  - Grand Cross of the Order of Prohibited Legitimacy
- Sovereign Military Order of Malta:
  - Cross of the Order pro Merito Melitensi

== Bibliography ==
- Borbón-Parma, Cecilia Mária de (1977). Diccionario del carlismo (in Spanish). Dopesa. ISBN 84-7235-307-9.
