= Princess María Teresa of Bourbon-Parma =

French-Spanish political activist and academic (1933–2020)

Princess Marie-Thérèse
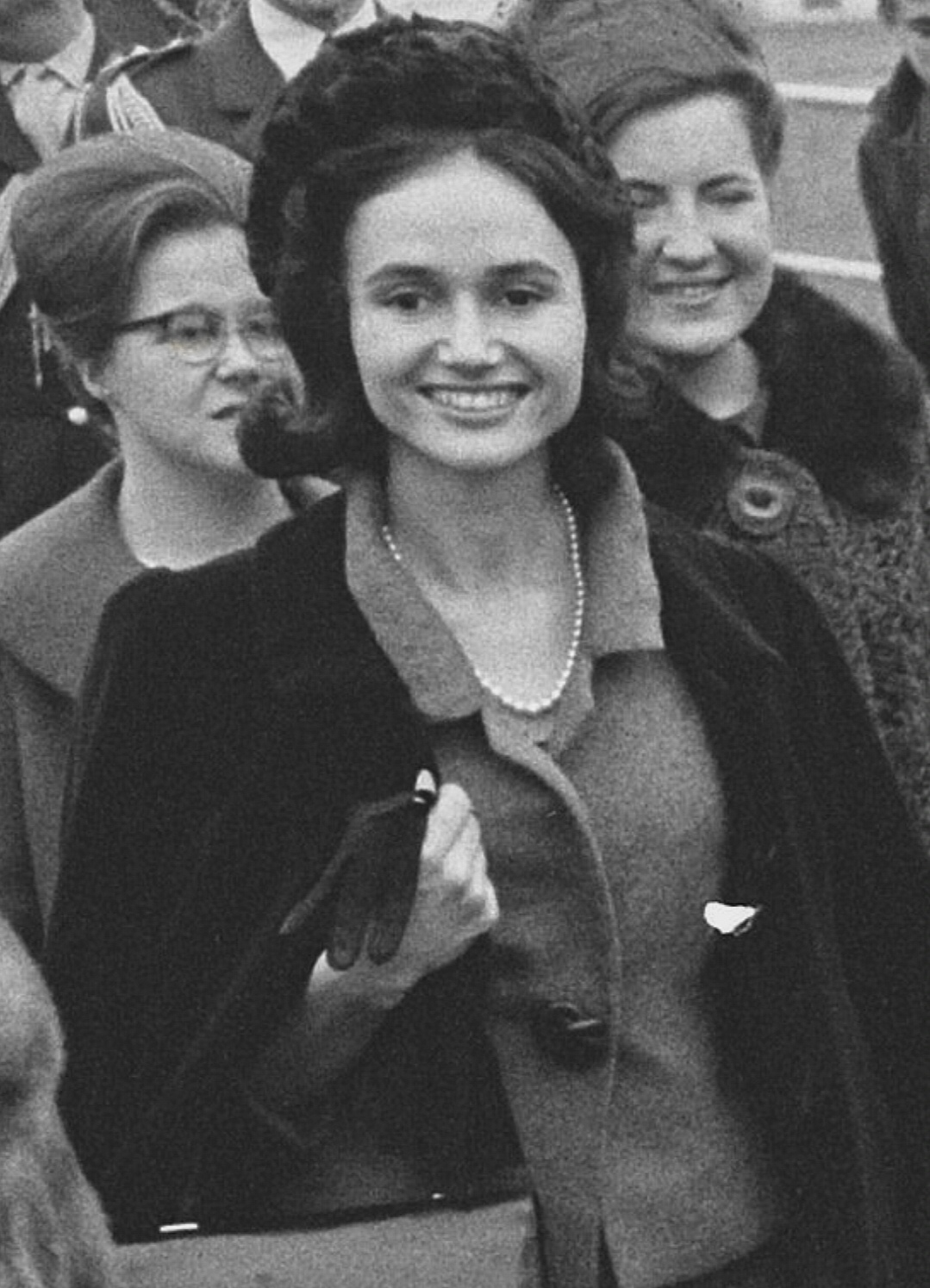
- Marie-Thérèse in February 1964
- Born: 28 July 1933; Paris, French Third Republic
- Died: 26 March 2020 (aged 86); Hôpital Cochin, Paris, France
- Burial: Sanctuary of Santa Maria della Steccata
Names
- French: Marie-Thérèse Cécile Zita Charlotte de Bourbon-Parme; Spanish: María Teresa Cecilia Zita Carlota de Borbón-Parma
- House: Bourbon-Parma
- Father: Prince Xavier, Duke of Parma and Piacenza
- Mother: Madeleine de Bourbon-Busset
- Occupation: Professor

Princess Marie-Thérèse of Bourbon-Parma (Spanish: María Teresa de Borbón-Parma, French: Marie-Thérèse de Bourbon-Parme; 28 July 1933 – 26 March 2020) was a French-Spanish political activist and academic. She was a member of the House of Bourbon-Parma, a cadet branch of the Spanish royal family. She was a socialist activist, earning the nickname Red Princess, and a monarchist who supported the Carlist movement. She is the first royal known to have died of COVID-19.

== Early life and education ==
Princess Marie Thérèse was born on 28 July 1933 in Paris. She was the daughter of Prince Xavier of Bourbon-Parma, Duke of Parma and Piacenza, a Carlist claimant to the Spanish throne, and Madeleine de Bourbon-Busset, a member of a cadet branch of the House of Bourbon. She was the younger sister of Princess Marie Françoise and Carlos Hugo, Duke of Parma, and an older sister of Princess Cécile Marie, Princess Marie des Neiges and Prince Sixtus Henry, Duke of Aranjuez. She was a niece of Zita of Bourbon-Parma, the last Empress of Austria and Queen of Hungary and Bohemia.

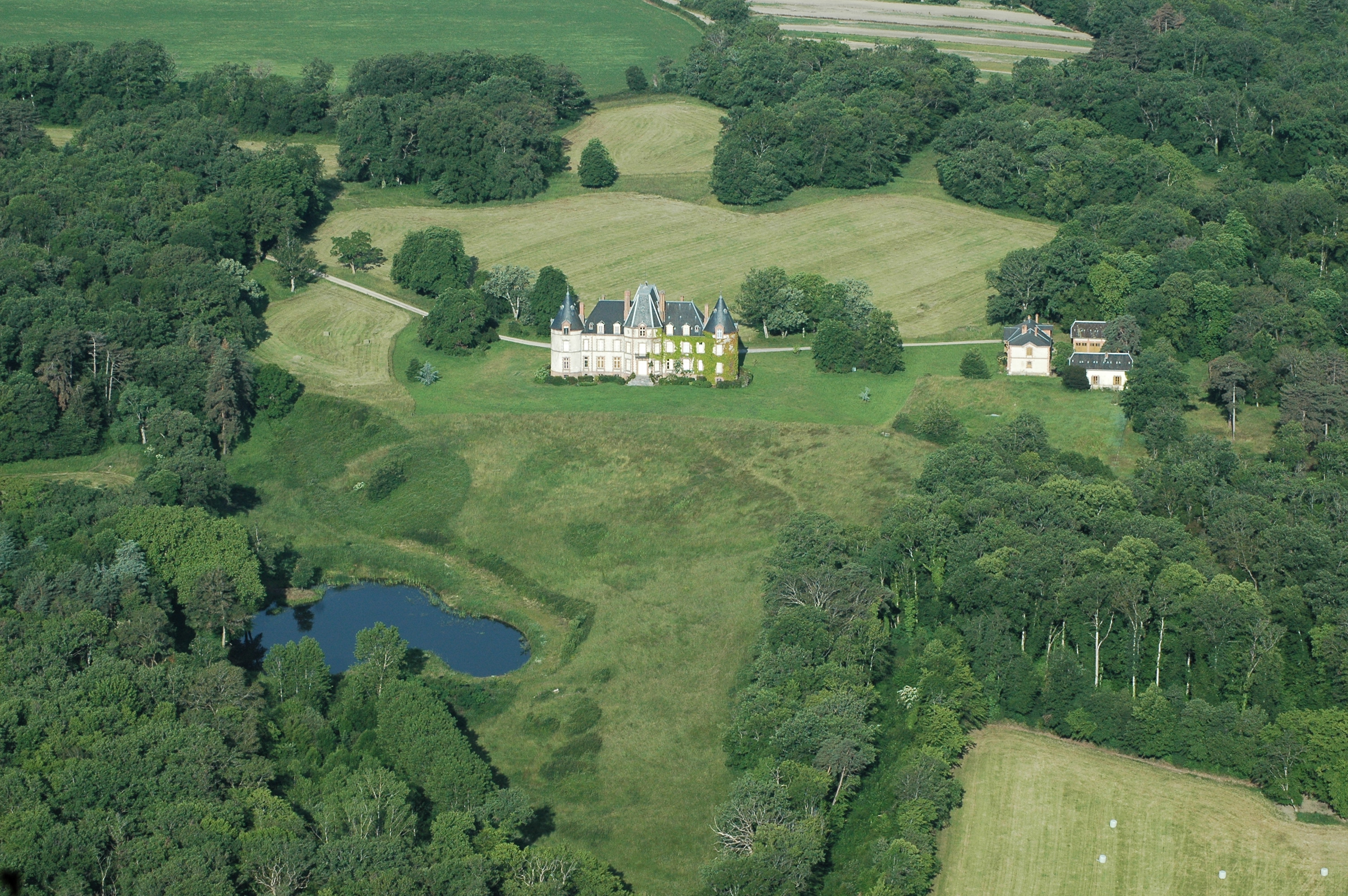
Chateau du Bostz, her childhood home

She grew up at the Chateau du Bostz, Besson, Bourbonnais. Having attended middle school in Tours, and Quebec City, she went on to obtain a doctorate in Hispanic studies from Paris-Sorbonne University and another doctorate in political sociology from the Complutense University of Madrid. She also studied Islam and how it related to women's rights. Her 1977 thesis at the Sorbonne was entitled "La clarificación ideológica del Carlismo contemporáneo" ("Ideological clarification of contemporary Carlism").

== Career and activism ==
Marie-Thérèse was a professor at both of her alma maters. She was also a socialist activist and fought for women's rights.

Marie-Thérèse supported her brother Carlos Hugo in his fight to make the Spanish Carlist party more liberal, supporting an ideological shift in her family's Carlism. Her royal roots and liberal socialist views attracted many personalities, leading her to meet André Malraux, François Mitterrand, Yasser Arafat and Hugo Chávez, and earned her the nickname of "Red Princess". This nickname was used as the (Spanish) title of a 2002 biography of María Teresa written by historian Josep Carles Clemente.

== Personal life ==
In 1981, Marie Thérèse acquired Spanish citizenship by royal decree; the official state bulletin said that it was given "at the request of the interested party and in response to the exceptional circumstances and her belonging to a family so closely linked to Spain".

In a 1997 interview, Marie Thérèse said that she was Christian, but criticized some Christian attitudes to immigration that sought to create a divide.

Marie Thérèse never married, and had no children. She was the aunt of Prince Carlos, Duke of Parma and 4th cousin, once removed, of the current King of Spain, Felipe VI.

In 2014, she published a history of the Bourbon-Parma family.

On 26 March 2020, Marie Thérèse became the first member of a royal family known to die of COVID-19. She died at Hôpital Cochin in Paris at the age of 86. A memorial service was held in Madrid on 27 March 2020, presided over by Rev. José Ramón García Gallardo, a priest of the Society of Saint Pius X and an officer of the Order of Prohibited Legitimacy. A second Catholic funeral was held on 2 April 2020 at Notre-Dame-des-Champs in Paris. Her death was announced on the official website of the House of Bourbon-Parma. Her family paid tribute to her involvement "in the struggle for democratization, social justice and freedom in Spain".

Marie Thérèse's funeral took place on 27 August 2021 at Sanctuary of Santa Maria della Steccata in Parma, and was buried there. The funeral mass held in Parma was attended by Prince Carlos Xavier, Duke of Parma and Piacenza; Princess Annemarie, Duchess of Parma and Piacenza; Prince Jaime, Count of Bardi; Princess Margarita, Countess of Colorno with her husband and daughters; Princess Maria Carolina, Marchioness of Sala with her husband and children; Princess Marie des Neiges, Countess of Castillo de la Mota; Princess Cécile Marie, Countess of Poblet and Princess Marie-Françoise, Dowager Princess of Lobkowicz.

== Ancestry ==
Ancestors of Princess María Teresa of Bourbon-Parma

Charles II, Duke of Parma
Charles III, Duke of Parma
Princess Maria Teresa of Savoy
Robert I, Duke of Parma
Charles Ferdinand, Duke of Berry
Princess Louise of Artois
Princess Caroline of Naples and Sicily, Duchess of Berry
Xavier, Duke of Parma
John VI of Portugal
Miguel I of Portugal
Carlota Joaquina of Spain
Infanta Maria Antonia of Portugal
Constantine of Löwenstein-Wertheim-Rosenberg
Princess Adelaide of Löwenstein-Wertheim-Rosenberg
Princess Agnes of Hohenlohe-Langenburg
Maria Teresa of Bourbon-Parma
Eugène de Bourbon-Busset, comte de Lignières
Henri de Bourbon, comte de Lignières
Idalie de Calonne de Courtebonne
Georges de Bourbon, comte de Lignières
Adrien de Mailly, marquis de Nesle
Adrienne de Mailly de Nesle
Eugénie Henriette de Lonlay
Madeleine de Bourbon-Busset
Charles-Fidèle de Kerret, vicomte de Quillien
René de Kerret, vicomte de Quillien
Marie Marguerite Lefebvre de La Faluère
Marie Jeanne de Kerret de Quillien
Claude Joseph Gautier
Marie Léonie Gautier
Claudine Benoîte Vespre

== Honours ==
- Duchy of Parma:
  - Senator Grand Cross with necklace of the Angelic Imperial Holy Constantinian Order of St. George
  - Grand Cross of the Ducal Royal Order of Saint Louis
  - Grand Cross of the Order of Prohibited Legitimacy

== See also ==
- Archduchess Elisabeth Marie of Austria, fellow socialist Royal, nicknamed "the Red Archduchess"

== Bibliography ==
- Borbón-Parma, María Teresa de (1977). El momento actual español, cargado de utopía (in Spanish). Editorial Cuadernos para el Diálogo. ISBN 9788422902164.
- Borbón-Parma, María Teresa de (1979). La clarificación ideológica del partido Carlista (in Spanish). BPR Publishers. ISBN 9788485596027.
- Borbón-Parma, María Teresa de (1990). Cambios en México (in Spanish). Tecnos. ISBN 9788430918591.
- Borbón-Parma, María Teresa de (1994). Magreb: Nuestro poniente proximo (in Spanish). Ediciones Libertarias. ISBN 9788476833308.
- Borbón-Parma, María Teresa de (1997). Don Javier : una vida al servicio de la libertad (in Spanish). Plaza & Janés Editores. ISBN 9788401530180.
- Borbón-Parma, María Teresa de (1999). Desde Tánger (in Spanish). Huerga Y Fierro Editores. ISBN 9788483740774.
- Borbón-Parma, María Teresa de (1999). Jardin de Dar Almutamid (in Spanish). L'Or du temps. ISBN 9789973757685.
- Borbón-Parma, María Teresa de (2001). La transición desde el frente exterior (in Spanish). Ediciones Simbad. ISBN 9788475603001.
- Borbón-Parma, María Teresa de (2009). Así fueron, así son (in Spanish). Planeta. ISBN 9788408088967.
- Bourbon-Parme, S.A.R. Maria Teresa de (2014). Les Bourbon Parme: une famille engagée dans l'histoire (in French). M. de Maule. ISBN 9782876235557.
- Bourbon-Parme, S.A.R. Maria Teresa de (2020). Notre patrimoine, c'est le vent de l'histoire: Toute histoire significative est contemporaine (in French). Michel de Maule. ISBN 9782876237131.
