= Prince Sixtus Henry of Bourbon-Parma =

Prince Sixtus Henry
- Duke of Aranjuez
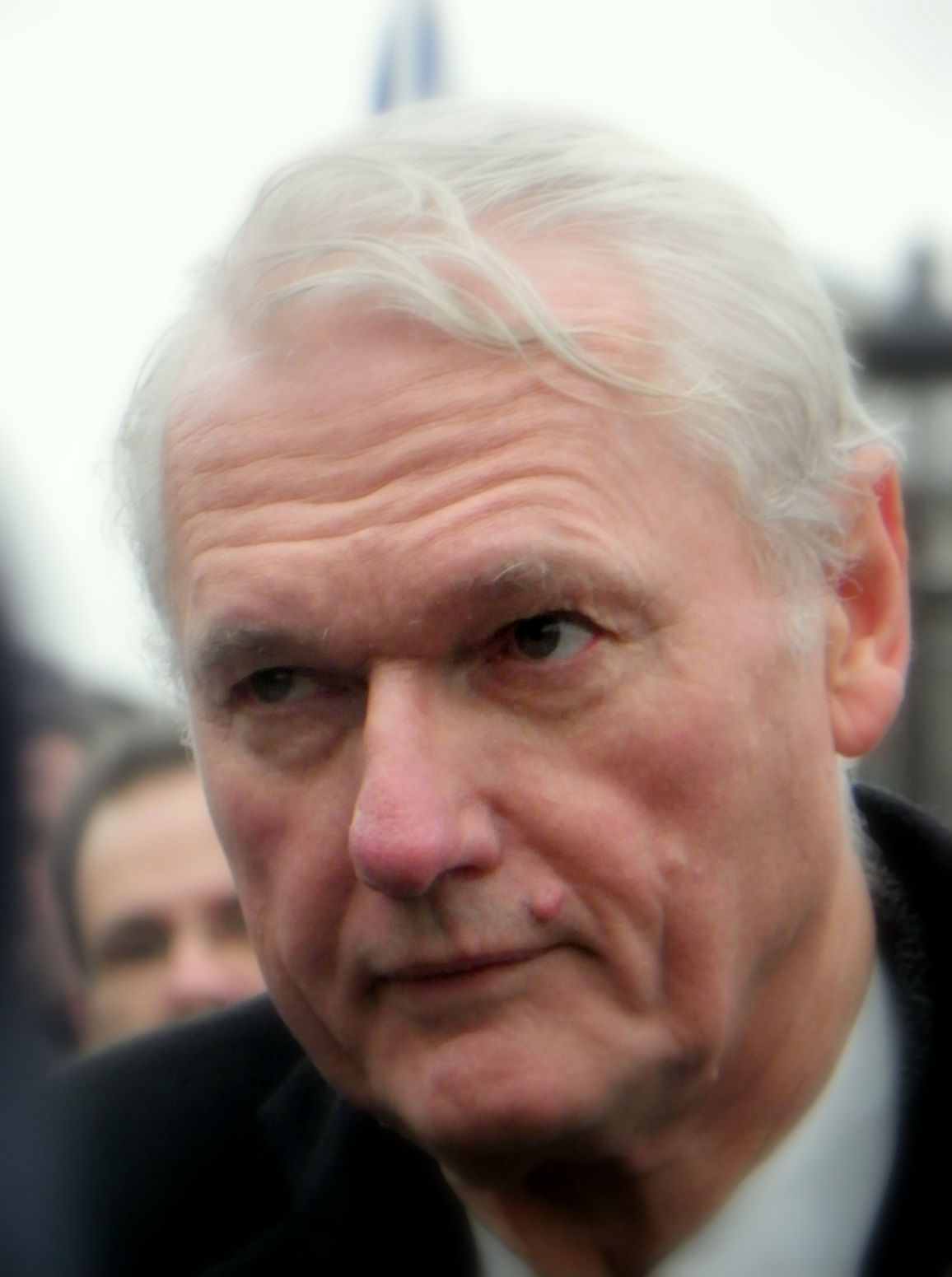
- Prince Sixtus Henry in 2014
- Born: 22 July 1940 (age 86); Pau, France
Names
- Sixte Henri Hugues François Xavier
- House: Bourbon-Parma
- Father: Xavier, Duke of Parma
- Mother: Madeleine de Bourbon-Busset
- Military career
- Allegiance: Spain; Portugal
- Branch: Spanish Army; Portuguese Army
- Service years: 1964–1965 (Spain); 1968–1974 (Portugal)
- Rank: Colonel
- Unit: Spanish Foreign Legion
- Conflicts: Angolan War

Prince Sixtus Henry of Bourbon-Parma (Spanish: Don Sixto Enrique de Borbón-Parma y de Borbón-Busset; Italian: Don Sisto Enrico di Borbone Parma; born 22 July 1940), known as Enrique V by supporters, is considered Regent of Spain by some Carlists who accord him the titles Duke of Aranjuez, Infante of Spain, and Standard-bearer of Tradition.

== Early life ==
Coat of arms used by the supporters of the Carlist claimants to the Spanish Throne with the Sacred Hearts of Jesus and Mary adopted c.1942 by Xavier of Bourbon.

Sixtus was born in Pau, Pyrénées-Atlantiques during the World War II Vichy regime of France, the second son of Prince Xavier of Bourbon-Parma (then Prince Regent, later Carlist pretender to the throne of Spain, later titular Duke of Parma) and his wife Madeleine de Bourbon-Busset. He belongs to a cadet branch of the former royal dynasty of France (and current dynasty of Spain), the House of Bourbon, which ruled the independent Duchy of Parma in Italy until 1859, and reigns (patrilineally) today in Luxembourg. In exile, his family lived in France. He is a brother of Princess Cécile, Princess María Teresa, Princess Marie Françoise, Princess Marie des Neiges, and Prince Carlos Hugo.

From an early age Sixtus devoted himself to the cause of Carlism. He studied with the Christian Brothers, Benedictines and Marists, as well as with his preceptress, Professor María Teresa Angulo, from Madrid. He also studied in Quebec City. He later took courses in law (at Clermont-Ferrand), classical and modern languages, and finance.

Under the nom de guerre of Enrique Aranjuez Martínez he secretly enlisted in the Spanish Foreign Legion in 1965. On 2 May that year he swore loyalty to the Spanish flag with the oath then in use, which excluded political compromise (as opposed to the later one, which states fidelity to the Spanish Constitution of 1978) and served in Melilla. After being discovered, he was expelled after eight months of service. Sixtus later volunteered with the Portuguese Armed Forces in the Angolan War of Independence against the "Anglo-Saxon influence". He ended his military career with the rank of colonel.

His descent from Louis XIII was confirmed by DNA in 2013.

== Claim to the Carlist succession ==
Sixtus's father, Prince Xavier of Bourbon-Parma, was the leader of the National Council of the Traditionalist Communion, the largest faction of Spanish Carlists, and thus claimed to be the rightful monarch of Spain (as "Javier I") from 1952 until his "abdication" in 1975. Xavier's successor, in whose favor Xavier renounced his Carlist claim in 1975, was Sixtus's older brother Carlos Hugo, Duke of Parma, who took the title "Carlos VIII" as claimant to the Spanish crown.

However, Carlos Hugo's deviations from traditional Carlist ideology—most notably his endorsement of Titoist socialism—caused many Carlists to question his leadership. Carlos Hugo sought to change the political direction of the Carlist movement through the Carlist Party, of which he was the official head during the 1976 Carlist gathering when the fatal Montejurra incident occurred, and at which Sixtus Henry was also present, leading opposition to his brother's reforms.

After the death of Xavier in 1977, Sixtus put forth the claim to be regent, and took the title "Standard-bearer of Tradition". Sixtus' claim was supported by their mother; his father's last wishes were difficult to discern. Sixtus publicly protested when Carlos Hugo donated the Carlist archives to the government of Spain in 2002.

Carlos Hugo renounced his claim to the throne in 1979 or 1980, but reasserted it in 2003. After his death in 2010, his son Prince Carlos, Duke of Parma succeeded him in the eyes of the Carlists loyal to Carlos Hugo (the Partido Carlista), and his followers claimed on a blog his kingship as "Carlos Javier I". In 2016 Carlos told the Spanish press that, while (like his father in 2005) he "does not abandon" his claim to the throne, it is "not a priority" in his life, and he "will not dispute" [no planteo pleito] the legitimacy of King Felipe VI.

The Carlist organization known as Comunión Tradicionalista recognizes Sixtus as their leader and calls him the "standard-bearer of Tradition". Some of them recognize him as king, under the title Enrique V. Sixtus himself has never explicitly asserted his right to the throne; rather, he has stated that he would prefer to remain regent in the hope that one of Carlos Hugo's sons may return to traditional Carlist ideology. Nonetheless, he has not objected to his followers shouting "¡Viva el Rey!" during his speeches.

== Later life ==
Although the youngest of six children and the second son of his parents, Sixtus inherited his childhood home, the chateau de Lignières near the middle of France, from his mother whose dowry it had been.

In 2010, he sought a court order to prevent the continued exhibition of artworks by the Japanese artist Takashi Murakami at the Palace of Versailles. He has publicly stated that it "denatures" French culture.

Sixtus was present at the episcopal ordination of four bishops who belong to the Society of Saint Pius X by Archbishop Marcel Lefebvre on 30 June 1988 at Écône, Switzerland, and was the first to publicly congratulate him.

Sixtus has travelled widely in Latin America, both Spanish and Portuguese-speaking. In January 2001, while travelling through Argentina, he was in a nearly fatal traffic accident, from which he did not completely recover. He has difficulties walking as a result of the accident, prompting him to limit public appearances.

In 2014 he took part in a far-right meeting in Vienna organised by Konstantin Malofeev, in which the participants (among others Aleksandr Dugin, Marion Maréchal-Le Pen, Aymeric Chauprade, Ilya Glazunov, Volen Siderov, Heinz-Christian Strache, Johann Gudenus, Johann Herzog and Serge de Pahlen) discussed about how to 'save Europe from liberalism and the "satanic" homosexual lobby'.

In the context of the Syrian civil war, he has stated that Bashar al-Assad is the legitimate President of Syria and that the Arab Spring was an Anglo-American intervention to take control of the Middle East.

Since 2015, Sixtus has claimed the title of Grand Master of the Order of Saint Lazarus, as part of its "Jerusalem obedience" wing.

== Succession ==
Within the Traditionalist Communion there has been speculation about the possible succession of the Carlist Claim to the Spanish Throne. Officially, its Political Secretariat of Sixto has spoken out against the lineage of Carlos Javier de Borbón-Parma (who would have been the holder of the Carlist rights if he had not adopted the Socialist positions of his father, who was excluded from the succession) being in his line of succession, due to being excluded for losing Legitimacy of exercise. Given this, according to the Succession Regulation of 1713 of an Agnatic Semi-Salic nature (still considered in force by Carlist jurisprudence), it has been suggested that, due to the extinction of the male descendants of Javier de Borbón-Parma (father of Don Sixto and previous holder of the Carlist claims) due to the lack of children of Sixto, the inheritance of Sixto would fall to the lineage of his closest male nephews (and who also maintain the Catholic integrity of traditionalism). That is, the inheritance would go to the male lineage of Javier's eldest daughter and Sixto's major sister, Maria Francisca of Bourbon-Parma, who would transmit it to Carlos Enrique de Lobkowicz y Borbón (as her only surviving son by Maria, after the death of his older brother by Carlos and Sixto's first heir, his nephew Eduardo-Javier de Lobkowicz). If he could not accede to the throne, the next in succession would come from the male lineage of Javier's older sister and Sixto's major aunt, Zita of Bourbon-Parma, who would transmit it to her grandson Lorenzo of Habsburg-Lorraine (second-born son of Robert of Habsburg-Lorraine and Bourbon, eldest son of Zita, and therefore 2° eldest nephew of Sixto).

== Distinctions ==
=== Orders ===
- Knight Grand Cross of Honour and Devotion of the Sovereign Military Order of Malta
- Knight Grand Cross of Justice of the Sacred Military Constantinian Order of Saint George

=== Other ===
- One of three pretending grand masters of the Order of Saint Lazarus (statuted 1910), the Jerusalem obedience, since 2015
- One of two pretending grand masters of the Order of Prohibited Legitimacy

Prince Sixtus Henry of Bourbon-Parma House of Bourbon-Parma Cadet branch of the House of Bourbon Born: 22 July 1940
Titles in pretence
Preceded by Prince Jaime, Count of Bardi	Line of succession to the French throne (Legitimist); 32nd position	Succeeded by Henri, Grand Duke of Luxembourg
Vacant Title last held by Prince Xavier of Bourbon-Parma	— TITULAR — Regent of Spain; Carlist claimant 7 May 1977 – present	Incumbent
