= Princess Marie des Neiges of Bourbon-Parma =

French ornithologist and Carlist activist

Princess Marie des Neiges
- Countess of Castillo de la Mota
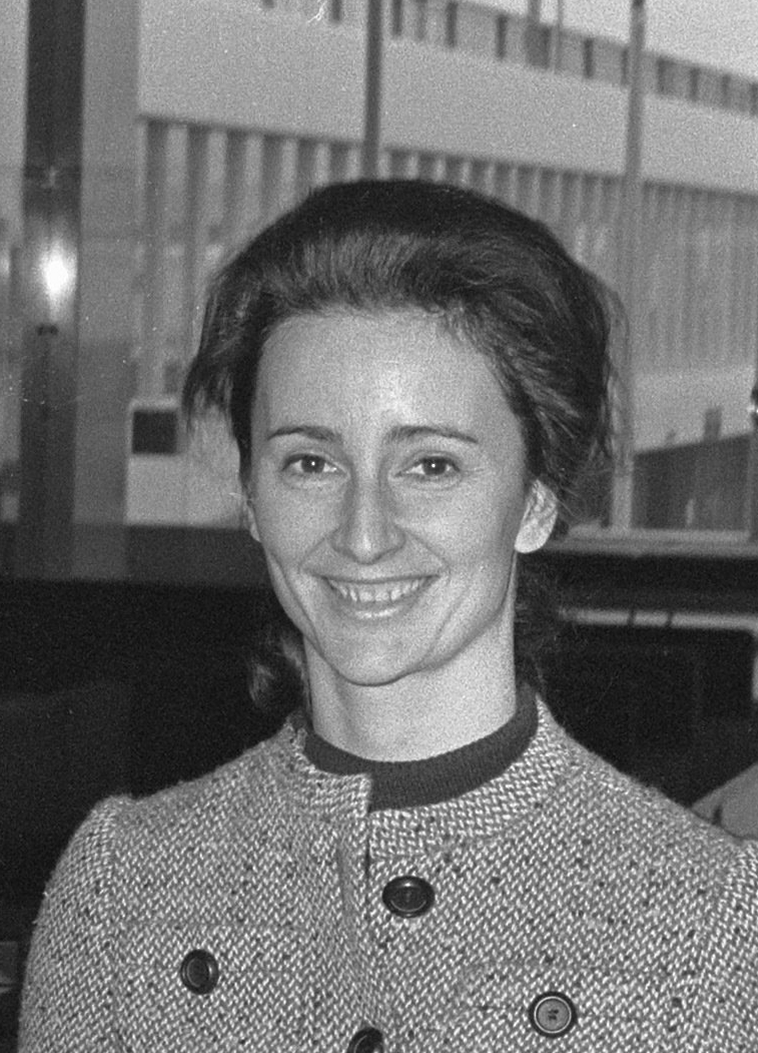
- Princess Marie des Neiges in 1970
- Born: 29 April 1937 (age 89); Paris, French Third Republic
Names
- French: Marie des Neiges Madeleine Françoise de Bourbon-Parme; Spanish: María de las Nieves Magdalena Francisca de Borbón-Parma
- House: Bourbon-Parma
- Father: Prince Xavier, Duke of Parma and Piacenza
- Mother: Madeleine de Bourbon-Busset
- Occupation: ornithologist

Princess Marie des Neiges Madeleine Françoise of Bourbon-Parma, Countess of Castillo de la Mota (Spanish: María de las Nieves de Borbón-Parma, French: Marie des Neiges de Bourbon-Parme; born 29 April 1937) is a French aristocrat, ornithologist, and Carlist activist. She is the youngest daughter of Prince Xavier, Duke of Parma and Madeleine de Bourbon-Busset. A progressive Carlist, she supported the liberal reforms to the party made by her elder brother, Prince Carlos Hugo, Duke of Parma, and rejected the conservative faction of the party created by her younger brother, Prince Sixtus Henry, Duke of Aranjuez. In her youth, she was a prominent socialite in Parisian society. Marie des Neiges has a doctorate in biology and worked as an ornithologist. She is a recipient of the Grand Cross of the Sacred Military Constantinian Order of Saint George and the Grand Cross of the Order of Prohibited Legitimacy.

Active in events linked to the former Duchy of Parma and Piacenza, she serves as the president of the Academic Senate of the Studium and is involved with the Marie-Thérèse of Bourbon-Parma International Award. She also created an award, the "Doña Maria de las Nieves of Parma Award", given to people who have made significant contributions to their communities and the world at large.

== Early life and family ==
Princess Marie des Neiges Madeleine Françoise was born in Paris on 29 April 1937 as the fourth daughter of Prince Xavier, Duke of Parma and Piacenza and his wife Madeleine de Bourbon-Busset. Her father was the titular Duke of Parma, the Carlist pretender to the Spanish throne, and the Head of the House of Bourbon-Parma. Her mother was the daughter of Georges de Bourbon-Busset, Count de Lignières and a member of the non-dynastic Bourbon-Busset line of the House of Bourbon. She is the younger sister of Prince Carlos Hugo, Duke of Parma, Princess Marie Thérèse, Princess Cécile Marie, and Princess Marie Françoise, and elder sister of Prince Sixtus Henry, Duke of Aranjuez.

During her childhood and adolescence, she was educated in the United States and in Quebec. Throughout her youth, she was active in society and attending various balls, including the Paris Ball held at the French Embassy in Brussels. In 1964, she attending the wedding of Princess Irene of the Netherlands and her brother, Prince Carlos Hugo, in Rome. Also, in July 1964, she represented her family at the wedding of Prince Guy of Bourbon-Parma, her cousin, with Brigitte Peu-Duvallon, in Cannes, France.

== Activism ==
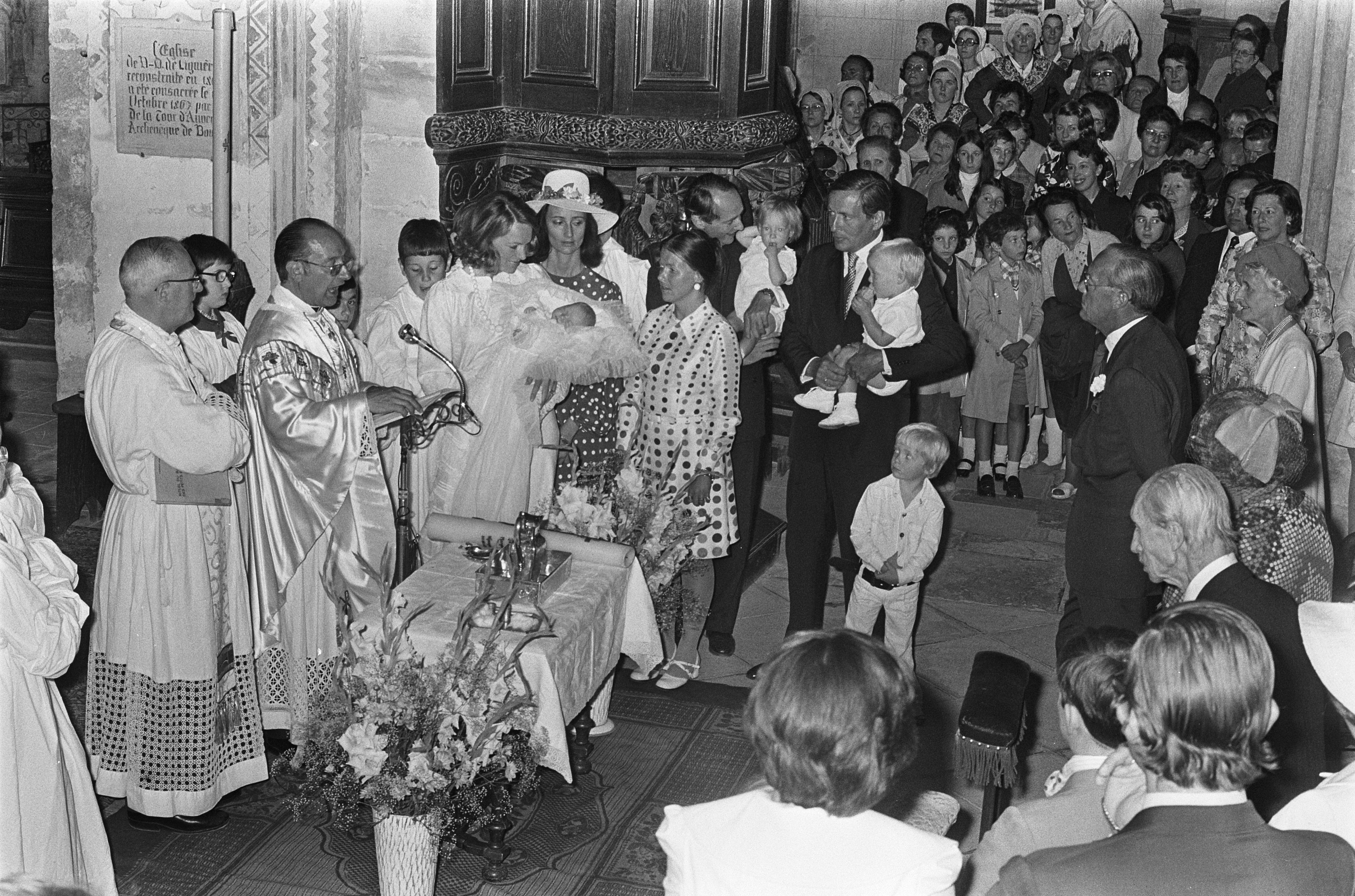
Princess Marie des Neiges (behind Princess Irene of the Netherlands) acts as godmother at the christening of her niece Princess Maria Carolina, daughter of her brother Prince Carlos Hugo, 1974.

=== Carlist activism ===
A Carlist, she supported the progressive reforms of her brother, Carlos Hugo, alongside her sisters Princesses Cécile Marie and Marie-Thérèse. She denounced the traditionalist agenda and Carlist claim made by her brother, Sixtus Henry. She attended Carlist gatherings around Spain to support political causes. Marie des Neiges' task in the Carlist office was to revise and correct political texts, being talented.

She began presiding over the annual Carlist meeting in Montejurra from a young age, the May 1961 meeting being one of the first. In 1962, she presided with her three sisters a large meeting of Carlists in the same locality, one of the largest of the 60s. In early September 1963, she began a visit to the Provinces of Castellón and Cádiz, touring cities such as Vinaròs, Villarreal, Castellón de la Plana, and Jerez de la Frontera, where she visited schools and other public facilities. In early March 1968 Princess Marie des Neiges, as a Carlist Infanta, visited Valencia, Navarre and Castilla–La Mancha for many Carlist events. She also took part in an event on the occasion of the carlist Feast of the Martyrs of Tradition (Fiesta de los Mártires de la Tradición) in Madrid before departing for her trip.

Marie des Neiges presided over an important gathering of Carlists in Montejurra in 1974. She was present at the Montejurra massacre on 9 May 1976. In 1976 she was expelled from Spain: she did not care about the order, however, and in response, she visited the spanish city of Santander, where she stayed for two days and where she attended carlist events and where she met great carlist personalities.

As a member of the Carlist party, she worked under the code name "Nuria" (in Spanish: "nombre de guerra") to avoid the Franco police and to escape the political vigilance of the then-regime.

As a reward for her hard work for Carlism and Spain, she was made Countess of Castillo de la Mota by her father.

=== Social activism ===
The Princess was active in the defense of the planet. When she settled in Extremadura, she founded the "G.R.U.S." association, aimed at defending the birds of the steppe, whose operational places are in La Serena, in the Province of Badajoz.

She organized campaigns against overgrazing and her association managed to obtain an agreement with the Regional Government of Extremadura, which allowed her to carry on an experiment in ecological pasture management.

She visited Kenya, Costa Rica, Ecuador and its Galápagos Islands, where she studied and deepened the problem of sustainable development and the preservation of their culture. While on an expedition to Kenya, she came into contact with the Maasai people and stayed with them.

== Recent years ==
In 2016, Marie des Neiges visited the former ducal lands of Parma, and was received by the city of Fontanellato's mayor, Francesco Trivelloni. She had previously visited Parma to attend the christening of her grandnephew Prince Carlos Enrique of Bourbon-Parma, of whom she was named godmother. In 2018, Marie des Neiges, Marie-Thérèse, and Cécile Marie reconciled with their sister, Marie-Françoise, ending their dispute over conflicting approaches on Carlism. The sisters spent a lot of time together after reconciling. As her sister, Cécile Marie, became ill, she helped care for her.

In March 2020, upon the death of her sister Marie-Thérèse, Marie des Neiges became the new president of the Academic Senate of the Studium in Monferrato, Italy. The office had belonged to Marie-Thérèse until her death. Marie des Neiges was contacted by Dr. Roger Rossell, Academic Senator in charge of international relations, who asked her if she wanted to become President, and she accepted. She also became President of the «Marie-Thérèse of Bourbon-Parma International Award» (so named in honor of her sister), already in its third edition.

She works as a ornithologist and has a doctorate in biology.

Princess Marie des Neiges received a Grand Cross of the Sacred Military Constantinian Order of Saint George, a Grand Cross of the Order of St. Lodovico, and a Grand Cross of the Order of Prohibited Legitimacy.

== Honours ==
- Duchy of Parma and Piacenza:
  - Senator Grand Cross with necklace of the Angelic Imperial Holy Constantinian Order of St. George
  - Grand Cross of the Ducal Royal Order of Saint Louis
  - Grand Cross of the Order of Prohibited Legitimacy
