= Prince Hugo de Bourbon de Parme =

Dutch noble

Prince Hugo
- Full name: Carlos Hugo Roderik Sybren de Bourbon de Parme
- Born: Carlos Hugo Roderik Sybren Klynstra; 20 January 1997 (age 29); Nijmegen, Gelderland; The Netherlands
- Father: Prince Carlos, Hereditary Duke of Parma
- Mother: Brigitte Klynstra

Prince Hugo de Bourbon de Parme (Carlos Hugo Roderik Sybren; born 20 January 1997), formerly Hugo Klynstra, is a member of the extended Dutch royal family as the son of Prince Carlos, Hereditary Duke of Parma. He was the first great-grandchild of Queen Juliana of the Netherlands.

Born out of wedlock, he was denied titles and family rights by his father until the Dutch Council of State ruled in his favor in 2018, granting him the style and title of His Royal Highness Prince Carlos Hugo Roderik Sybren de Bourbon de Parme. Despite the ruling, he is neither a member of the Dutch royal house (although considered a member of the extended Dutch royal family) nor a member of the House of Bourbon-Parma and is not in the line of succession to the defunct Parmese throne.

== Early life and family ==
Carlos Hugo Roderik Sybren Klynstra was born in Nijmegen on 20 January 1997 to Prince Carlos de Bourbon de Parme, Prince of Piacenza and his friend Brigitte Klynstra. A 1999 court order pursued by his mother determined his paternity. Due to being an illegitimate son, he was not born a prince. His father told Dutch media that Hugo's birth was "his mother's wish" and an "independent decision", denying his son any family rights.

His maternal grandmother, Ingrid Pieksma-Klynstra, was the wife of Adolph Roderik Ernst Leopold, Count of Rechteren-Limpurg. Through this relation, he is a relative by marriage of Princess Anna of Ysenburg and Büdingen, Princess consort of Lippe. Through his father, he is a grandson of Carlos Hugo, Duke of Parma and Princess Irene of the Netherlands. He is the first great-grandchild of Queen Juliana of the Netherlands and Prince Bernhard of Lippe-Biesterfeld. He is also a great-grandson of Prince Xavier of Bourbon-Parma and Madeleine de Bourbon-Busset.

Upon the death of his grandfather, Carlos Hugo, in 2010, his father became the titular Duke of Parma and Piacenza, Carlist claimant to the Spanish throne, and the Head of the House of Bourbon-Parma. That same year, his father married the Dutch journalist Annemarie Gualthérie van Weezel. According to a royal decree of Queen Beatrix in 1996, his father is also a Dutch prince.

He is the half-brother of Princess Luisa of Parma, Marchioness of Castell'Arquato, Princess Cecilia of Parma, Countess of Berceto and Prince Carlos of Parma, The Prince of Piacenza.

== Legal dispute over title ==
Upon turning eighteen in 2015, Hugo went to court to have his surname changed from Klynstra to his father's surname, 'de Bourbon de Parme', and claimed the dutch noble title of prince. He also sought a listing in the register of the High Council of Nobility which, by law, offers illegitimate children of nobles a right to their family's titles. His father responded with a series of court appeals, leading to a long legal battle between the two. The Hereditary Duke of Parma insisted that he had a formal agreement with Hugo's mother that their relationship was "no-strings-attached" and that there would be "no family entanglement" following Hugo's conception.

In 2016 the Ministry of Justice and Security ruled in favor of Hugo's claim and granted him the use of his father's surname. Following the ruling, his father filed an appeal, taking the issue to court again. On 28 February 2018, the Dutch Council of State ruled in Hugo's favor, stating that Dutch law on nobility was clear and that the circumstances of Hugo's birth are irrelevant, granting Hugo the right to claim both his father's surname and (dutch) noble title and address. As such, he became His Royal Highness Prince Carlos Hugo Roderik Sybren de Bourbon de Parme. The title of 'Prince(ss) de Bourbon de Parme' is a Dutch title, bestowed by Queen Beatrix in 1996, and does not mean that Hugo automatically became a member of the House of Bourbon-Parma. The court ruling stated that membership to the House of Bourbon-Parma is "a private matter for the royal house itself". As such, he is not in the line of succession to the defunct Parma throne. Otherwise, he is not a member of the Dutch royal house, but is considered a member of the extended Dutch royal family.

== Titles and styles ==
- 20 January 1997 – 28 February 2018: Carlos Hugo Roderik Sybren Klynstra
- 28 February 2018 – present: His Royal Highness Prince Carlos Hugo Roderik Sybren de Bourbon de Parme
