= 1973 World Congress of Peace Forces =

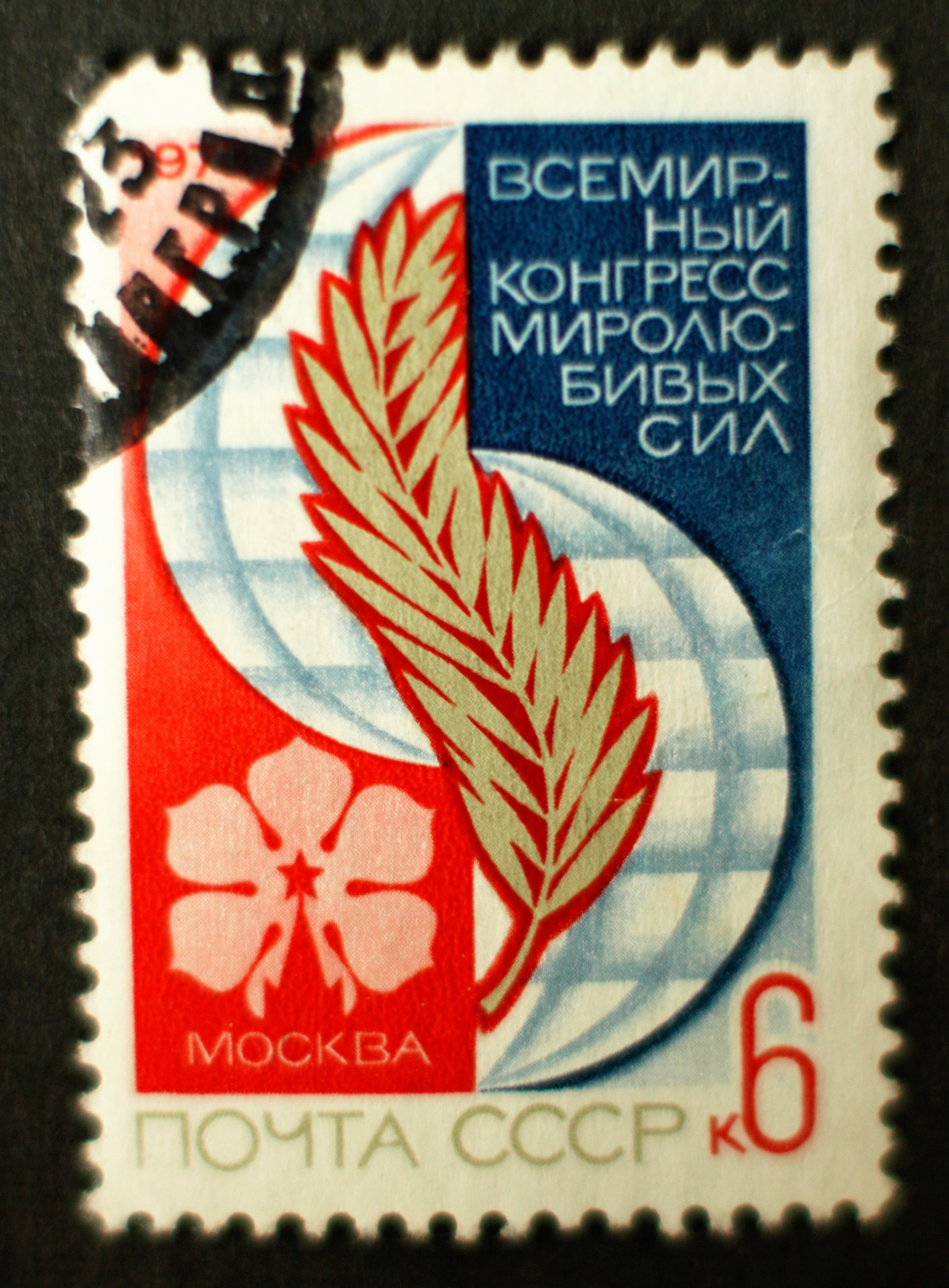
1973 USSR stamp

The 1973 World Congress of Peace Forces was held in Moscow, Russian SFSR, Soviet Union, October 25-October 31, 1973. At the congress over 3200 delegates from 143 countries, representing more than 1100 political parties, national organizations and movements. Representatives from 123 international organizations took part in the event.

== Opening session ==
The Congress was opened by Seán MacBride, president of the International Peace Bureau and vice chairman of the international preparatory committee of the Congress. Romesh Chandra, the general secretary of the World Peace Council, was elected chair of the Congress.

Other speakers at the opening of the conference were Abdulrahim Abby Farah, representative of the UN Secretary-General Kurt Waldheim, Peter Onu, vice general secretary of the Organisation of African Unity, and Pierre Lebart, representative of the UNESCO Director-General René Maheu.

The main speaker of the event was Leonid Brezhnev, general secretary of the Communist Party of the Soviet Union. His speech was followed by a short intervention by Horace Perera, general secretary of the World Federation of United Nations Associations, who thanked Brezhnev for his contributions for the cause of peace.

== Commissions ==
Fourteen separate commissions, who held parallel meetings during the Congress, were formed. These were:

Committee:	Chair:
Peaceful co-existence and international security	Józef Cyrankiewicz, chairman of the All-Polish Peace Committee
Indochina	André Souquiere, chair of the executive committee of the Stockholm Conference on Indochina
Middle East	Klim Čorbe, presidium secretariat member of the Socialist Alliance of Working People of Yugoslavia
Security and cooperation in Europe	Raymond Goor (Belgium)
Peace and security in Asia	Abdus Samad Azad, honorary president of the WPC, Minister of Agriculture of Bangladesh
Disarmament	Richard Andriamanjato, chairman of Party of the Independence Congress of Madagascar
National liberation movement, struggle against colonialism and racism	Marcelino dos Santos, vice chairman of FRELIMO, Mozambique
Development and economic independence	Dr. César Rondon Lovera (Venezuela)
Environmental care	E. K. Fjodorov (Soviet Union)
Cooperation in education and culture	James Aldridge, author (UK)
Economic and scientific-technological cooperation	Franz Nemschak, director of the Austrian Institute for Economic Research
Social progress and human rights	Enrique Pastorino, chairman of World Federation of Trade Unions (Uruguay)
Cooperation between intergovernmental organizations and non-governmental organizations	Knud Nielsen, president of the World Federalist Association (Denmark)
Chile	Vilma Espin de Castro, chair of the Federation of Cuban Women

== See also ==
- Peace movement
- World Peace Council
