= Madeleine de Bourbon-Busset =

Duchess of Parma (1898–1984)

Madeleine
- Duchess of Parma
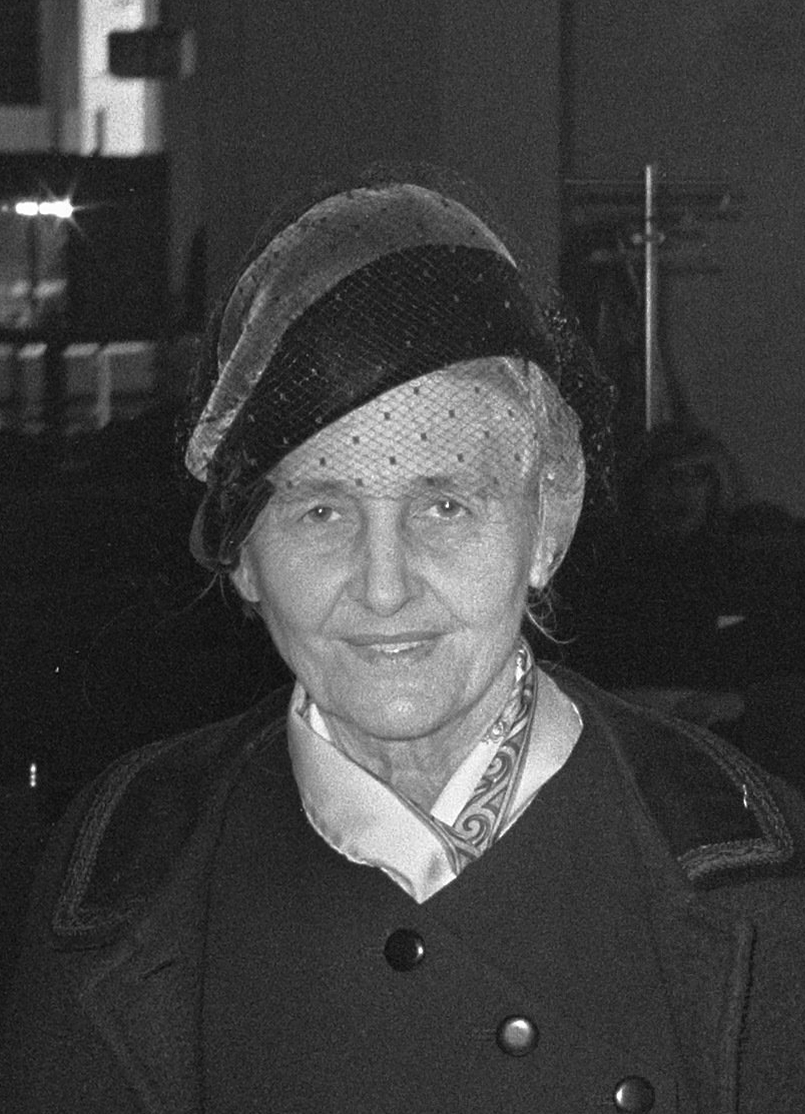
- Duchess Marie Madeleine of Parma in 1970
- Born: 23 March 1898; Paris, France
- Died: 1 September 1984 (aged 86); Paris, France
- Burial: Lignières Castle
- Spouse: Prince Xavier, Duke of Parma (m. 1927; died 1977)
- Issue: Marie Françoise, Princess Edouard de Lobkowicz; Prince Carlos Hugo, Duke of Parma; Princess Marie Thérèse; Princess Cécile Marie, Countess of Poblet; Princess Marie des Neiges, Countess of Castillo de la Mota; Prince Sixtus Henry, Duke of Aranjuez
Names
- Marie Madeleine Yvonne de Bourbon-Busset
- House: Bourbon-Busset
- Father: Georges, Count de Lignières
- Mother: Marie Josephine Jeanne de Kerret de Quillien

Princess Madeleine, Duchess of Parma and Piacenza (23 March 1898 – 1 September 1984) was the titular Duchess of Parma and Piacenza (from 1974) and was also Carlist Queen of Spain (from 1952) as the wife of Prince Xavier of Bourbon-Parma, the Carlist pretender to the Spanish throne.

== Life and family ==
She was born of a cadet branch of the Bourbon Counts of Busset, male-line descendants of Louis de Bourbon (1437–1482), prince du sang, Bishop of Liège, allegedly by a liaison with Catherine de Gueldres, on 23 March 1898. Her father was Georges de Bourbon-Busset, Count de Lignières (1860–1932), and her mother Marie Jeanne née de Kerret-Quillien (1866–1958).

Prince Xavier, the younger son of Robert I, Duke of Parma, and Madeleine were married on 12 November 1927 at the château de Lignières in Cher. The couple took up residence in the Bourbonnais, where Xavier managed Madeleine's farm lands. The marriage was accepted as dynastic at the time by neither Elias, Duke of Parma (Xavier's elder half-brother, then acting head of the House of Bourbon-Parma), nor by the senior Bourbons of the Spanish branch (Alfonso XIII), but was later recognized by the Parmesan Duke Robert Hugo, and by the Carlist pretender Infante Alfonso Carlos, Duke of San Jaime.

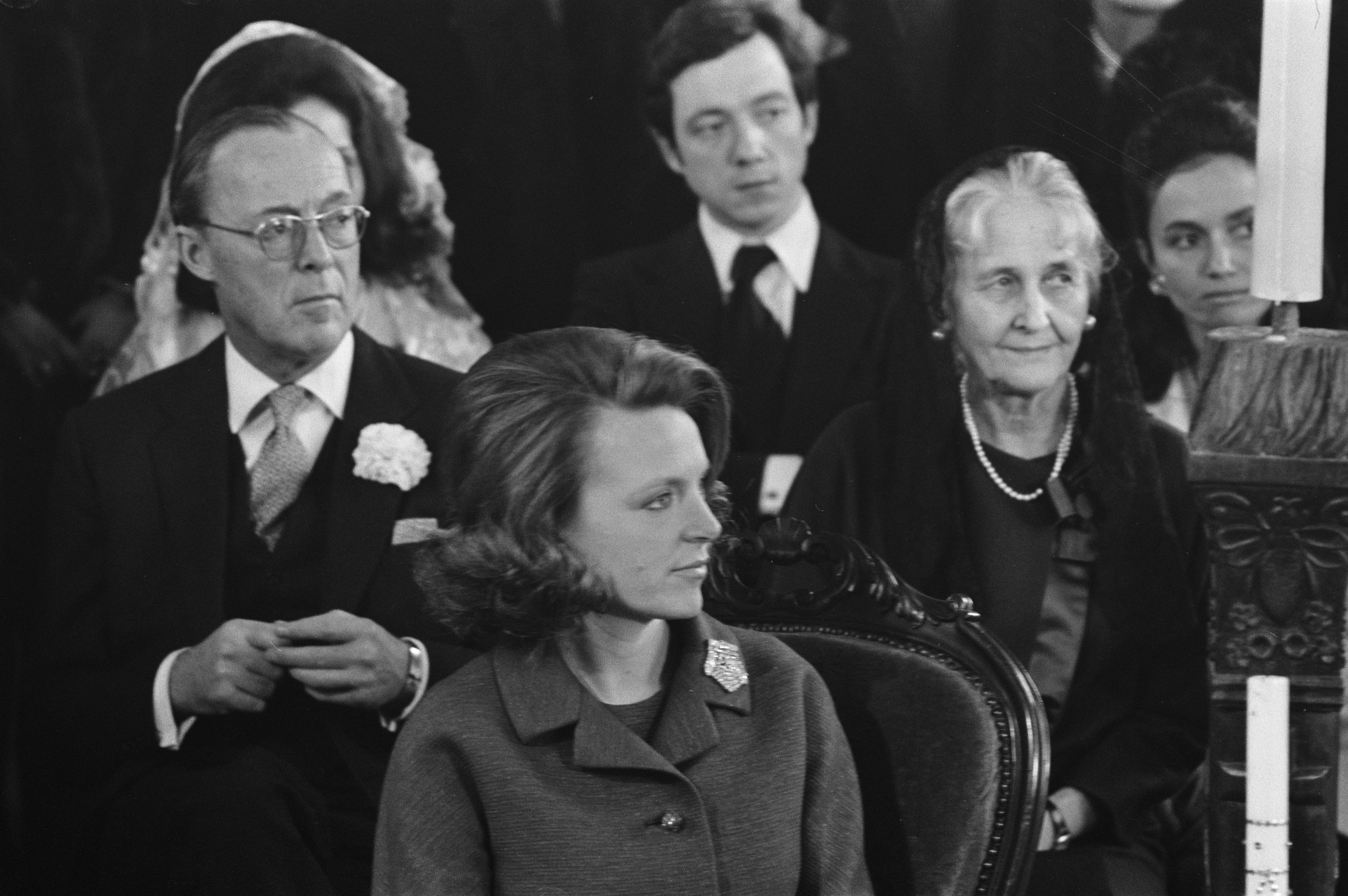
Madeline de Bourbon-Busset, Duchess of Parma at the baptism of her grandson, Prince Carlos de Bourbon, Duke of Parma, held at Château de Lignières, France, in 1970

In 1936, Alfonso Carlos, the last undisputed head of the Carlist movement, appointed her husband Xavier as Carlist "regent". Madeleine actively supported her husband's political activities and social views. Madeleine was the author of "Catherine de Médicis", published in France in 1940.

In 1977, she supported her son Sixtus in his political dispute with Carlos Hugo. and accused Princess Cecile and Carlos Hugo of taking her husband out of the hospital against the instructions of the doctors to force him to sign a manifesto against Traditionalism. After the death of her husband she repudiated and disinherited her children Carlos Hugo, María Teresa, Cecilia and Nieves, and ordered that upon her death they could not attend the wake for his corpse in Lignières.

The couple had six children:

1. Princess Marie Françoise of Bourbon-Parma (born 19 August 1928), she married Prince Edouard de Lobkowicz (1926–2010) and had issue;
2. Prince Carlos Hugo of Bourbon-Parma (8 April 1930 – 18 August 2010), Duke of Parma and Piacenza as head of the house of Bourbon-Parma, "Carlist" King of Spain. He married Princess Irene of the Netherlands and had issue;
3. Princess Marie Thérèse of Bourbon-Parma (28 July 1933 – 26 March 2020), victim of COVID-19;
4. Princess Cécile Marie of Bourbon-Parma (12 April 1935 – 1 September 2021), she was named Countess of Poblet by her father. She never married;
5. Princess Marie des Neiges of Bourbon-Parma (born 29 April 1937), she was named Countess of Castillo de la Mota by her father. She never married;
6. Prince Sixtus Henry of Bourbon-Parma (born 22 July 1940), he was named Duke of Aranjuez by his father. He never married.

== Ancestry ==
Ancestors of Madeleine de Bourbon-Busset

8. Eugène de Bourbon-Busset, comte de Lignières
4. Henri de Bourbon-Busset, comte de Lignières
9. Idalie de Calonne de Courtebonne
2. Georges de Bourbon-Busset, comte de Lignières
10. Adrien de Mailly, marquis de Nesle
5. Adrienne de Mailly de Nesle
11. Eugénie Henriette de Lonlay
1. Madeleine de Bourbon-Busset
12. Charles-Fidèle de Kerret, vicomte de Quillien
6. René de Kerret, vicomte de Quillien
13. Marie Marguerite Lefebvre de La Faluère
3. Marie Jeanne de Kerret de Quillien
14. Claude Joseph Gautier
7. Marie Léonie Gautier
15. Claudine Benoîte Vespre

== References and notes ==
Madeleine de Bourbon-Busset House of Bourbon-Busset Cadet branch of the House of Bourbon Born: 23 March 1898 Died: 1 September 1984
Titles in pretence
Vacant Title last held by Maria das Neves of Portugal	— TITULAR — Queen consort of Spain; Carlist; 20 May 1952 – 7 May 1977	Succeeded by Irene of the Netherlands
Preceded by Maria Antónia of Portugal	— TITULAR — Duchess of Parma; 15 November 1974 – 7 May 1977	Succeeded by Irene of the Netherlands
