= Princess Irene of the Netherlands =

Dutch princess (born 1939)

Princess Irene
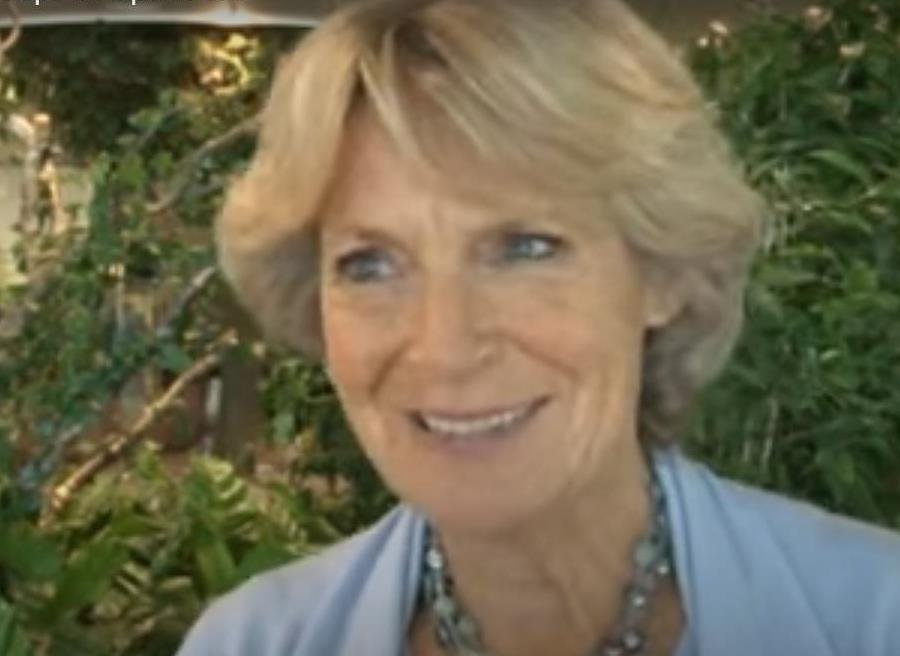
- Princess Irene in 2011

Duchess consort of Parma
- Pretense: 7 May 1977 – 7 January 1981
- Born: 5 August 1939 (age 87); Soestdijk Palace, Baarn, Kingdom of the Netherlands
- Spouse: Carlos Hugo, Duke of Parma (m. 1964; div. 1981)
- Issue: Prince Carlos, Duke of Parma; Princess Margarita, Countess of Colorno; Prince Jaime, Count of Bardi; Princess Carolina, Marchioness of Sala
Names
- Irene Emma Elisabeth van Oranje-Nassau, van Lippe-Biesterfeld
- House: Orange-Nassau (official); Lippe (agnatic)
- Father: Prince Bernhard of Lippe-Biesterfeld
- Mother: Juliana of the Netherlands

Princess Irene of the Netherlands (Irene Emma Elisabeth; born 5 August 1939) is the second child of Queen Juliana of the Netherlands and Prince Bernhard.

In 1964, she converted to Catholicism and married the then-Prince Carlos Hugo of Bourbon-Parma in a Catholic ceremony in Rome, thus forfeiting her place in the royal succession. Since their 1981 divorce, she has espoused left-wing causes, including anti-nuclear campaigns, and has developed a pantheistic philosophy about the relationship between man and nature.

== Childhood and family ==
The princess was born on 5 August 1939 at Soestdijk Palace. At the time of her birth, war was a distinct possibility but, because her parents hoped for a peaceful solution, they chose to name their new daughter for Eirene, the Greek goddess of peace. She has three sisters, the eldest of whom is the former queen of the Netherlands, Princess Beatrix of the Netherlands; the two younger ones are Princess Margriet and the late Princess Christina.

Because of the invasion of the Netherlands by Nazi Germany during World War II the Dutch royal family first fled to the United Kingdom. Irene was not yet a year old when the family was forced to leave the Netherlands; she was christened in the Chapel-Royal of Buckingham Palace in London, with the wife of King George VI, Queen Elizabeth, being one of her godparents. When the family was leaving the Netherlands, the port where they boarded the British warship was attacked by a German air raid; one of the German bombs exploded within 200 yards of the family. Irene was placed in a gasproof carrier to protect her from chemical warfare.

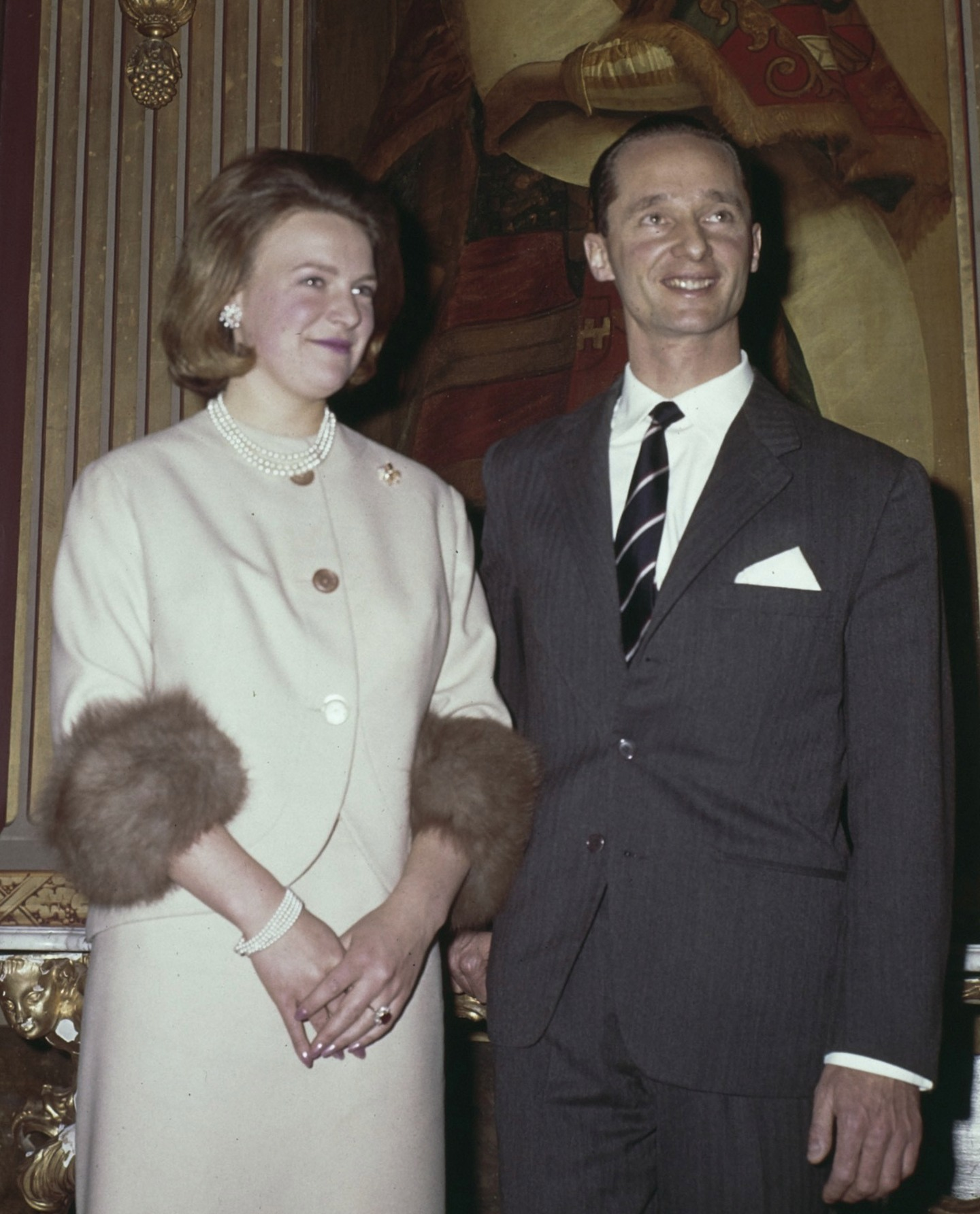
Princess Irene with Carlos Hugo in 1964

Princess Juliana and her daughters again took flight when the London Blitz began, this time to exile in Ottawa, Canada, where her younger sister, Margriet, was born and where Irene attended Rockcliffe Park Public School. As a teenager, she was dubbed by the Dutch press "the glamorous Princess of the Netherlands." During the war, the Royal Dutch Brigade (the formation of Free Dutch soldiers that fought alongside the Allies) was named for Princess Irene. This was continued after the war as the Regiment Prinses Irene.

Always an independent person, Irene was thrilled to receive a sports car from her father, one of the gifts he had been presented with. Irene's happiness was short-lived; when she opened the hood of the automobile, she noticed that the vehicle only looked like a sports car but had an ordinary car's engine. She asked her father for permission to turn the vehicle into a true racing-type auto, which Prince Bernhard refused to allow.

She was a bridesmaid at the 1962 wedding of Prince Juan Carlos of Spain and Princess Sophia of Greece and Denmark.

Princess Irene studied at the University of Utrecht, then went to Madrid to learn the Spanish language and became proficient enough to become an official interpreter.

== Marriage controversy ==
=== Conversion to Catholicism ===
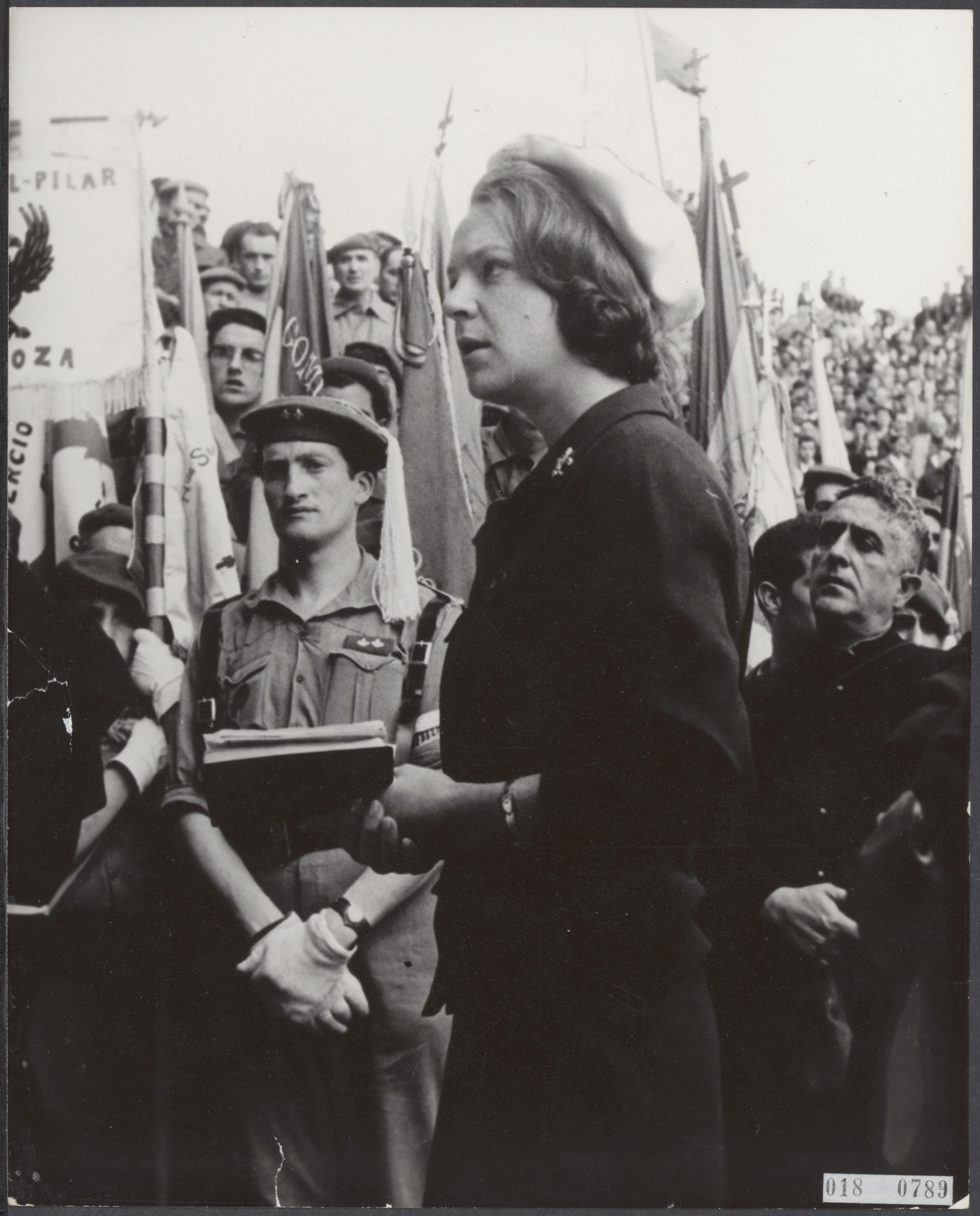
Irene (donning the Carlist Red Beret at Montejurra in 1965) controversially married Prince Carlos Hugo, the heir apparent of the Carlist movement.

While studying Spanish in Madrid, Irene met then Prince Carlos Hugo of Bourbon-Parma, the eldest son of Carlist claimant to the Spanish throne, Xavier, Duke of Parma and Head of the House of Bourbon-Parma. In the summer of 1963, Princess Irene secretly converted from Protestantism to Roman Catholicism. The first time the public or the royal family knew about the conversion was when a photograph appeared on the front page of an Amsterdam newspaper showing the Princess kneeling to receive communion at a Mass in the Roman Catholic Church of the Hieronymites (Los Jerónimos) in Madrid. Irene's conversion took place a year before her engagement announcement, but the royal family did not officially announce the news until January 1964. When news leaked out that she was engaged to Prince Carlos Hugo (born 1930), it provoked a Protestant outcry and a constitutional crisis.

Although Dutch law did not forbid a Catholic to reign over the Netherlands, Protestant succession was traditional, born out of the 16th-century Eighty Years' War with Spain and the assassination of William of Orange by a supporter of Philip II of Spain who believed William had betrayed both the Spanish monarch and the Catholic Church. By the middle of the 20th century, religious attitudes had begun to change, but only very slowly. While members of the Roman Catholic Church accounted for approximately 34 percent of the Dutch population, and Catholic political parties had been in coalition governments since 1918, the high fertility rate of the Catholics was a matter of some concern for all non-Catholics.

The Carlists, whose support of Francisco Franco amplified the crisis over a royal conversion to Catholicism and a marriage without approval of the Dutch States-General. For the second in line to the throne to not only convert to Roman Catholicism, but to marry the heir to the Carlist claim, caused shock and consternation in the Netherlands. When Princess Irene left the Netherlands to join Prince Carlos in Paris after the announcement of their engagement, a threat was telephoned to KLM Royal Dutch Airlines by an anonymous caller saying, "you should investigate the plane". The telephone call was construed to be a bomb threat and the airliner was searched, causing more than an hour's delay for the flight. It was the first instance of any threat involving the royal family and their air travel.

Queen Juliana attempted to stop the marriage, first by sending a member of her staff to Madrid to persuade the Princess not to go ahead with a marriage that would be a political disaster for the monarchy in the Netherlands. It seemed to work and the Queen went on Dutch radio to tell the citizens that Princess Irene had agreed to cancel her engagement and was returning to the Netherlands. When the airplane arrived at Schiphol Airport, the Princess was not on it, and Queen Juliana and her husband, Prince Bernhard were supplied with a Dutch military plane to go to Spain to retrieve their daughter. However, a message was delivered to the Queen from the Dutch government warning that it would resign en masse if she set foot in Spain. It was suggested that Princess Irene was a pawn of General Francisco Franco who tried to maximize the event to his benefit.

Given the ramifications and the fact that a monarch from the House of Orange had never visited Spain, the Queen had no choice but to turn back. Prince Bernhard then traveled to Madrid to meet with his daughter and her fiancé, who both accompanied him back to the Netherlands, where an immediate meeting took place with the couple, the Queen, Prime Minister Marijnen, himself a Roman Catholic, and three top cabinet ministers. When the meeting ended in the early hours of the morning on Sunday, 9 February 1964, Dutch radio broke its traditional Sabbath day silence to announce that Princess Irene would give up any rights of succession to the throne so she could marry Carlos Hugo. The princess further stated that she did not want the government to create a bill which would grant official consent to her marriage. In an attempt to gain public favour for her proposed marriage, Princess Irene publicly stated that her marriage was intended to help end religious intolerance. This caused a division in public opinion, as less than 40 percent of the country ruled by the Protestant House of Orange was Roman Catholic. Over the ensuing weeks, things deteriorated further when Pope Paul VI granted an audience requested by the couple in Rome. The Vatican believed the meeting was being held with the consent of the Dutch royal family. The Queen at first denied such a meeting had taken place, but it was later verified. Because the constitution prohibits members of the royal family from any involvement in foreign politics, Irene alienated herself from almost every Dutch citizen when a photo appeared in a Dutch paper showing her at a Carlist rally in Spain and she declared that she supported her fiancé's political goals. The Dutch government officially announced that it had no responsibility for either the words or actions of Princess Irene in the future on 10 April 1964. It was done in response to Irene's declaration of joining Carlos Hugo's political campaign to regain the throne of Spain on 8 April 1964.

=== Marriage ===
No one from the Dutch royal family or any Dutch diplomatic representative attended the marriage of Princess Irene and Prince Carlos Hugo in the Borghese Chapel at the Basilica di Santa Maria Maggiore in Rome, Italy, on 29 April 1964. There were also no representatives of Spain's Franco government at the ceremony; the couple chose Rome as the site of their nuptials because of its neutrality.

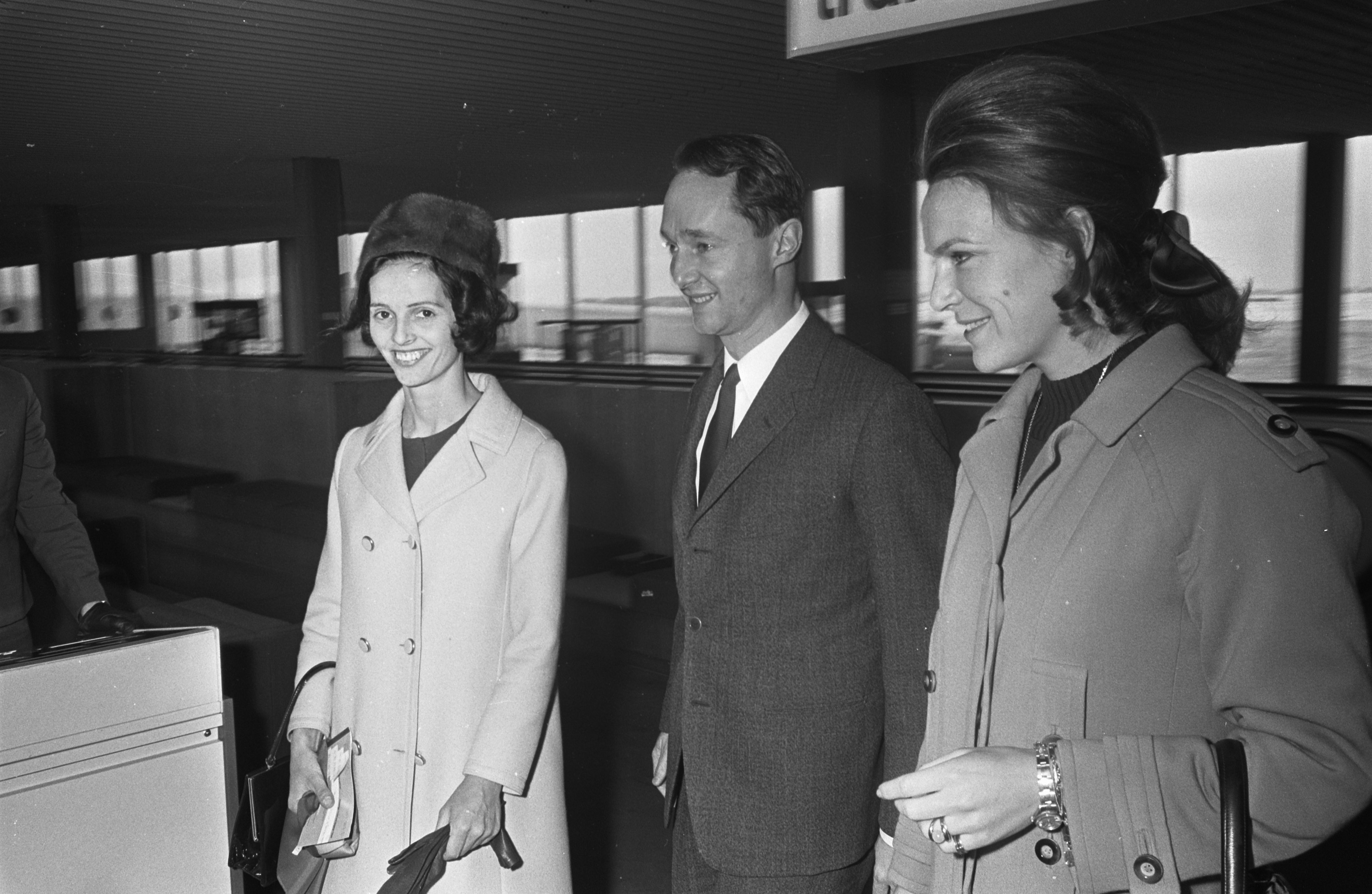
Princess Irene (right) with her husband and sister-in-law, Princess Cécile Marie, in 1968

Dutch television provided coverage of the marriage and Irene's family was among those who watched the ceremonies, although fate conspired in the form of a power failure which made them unable to see the last part of the rite. The Dutch royal family gathered at the home of Prince Bernhard's mother, Armgard of Sierstorpff-Cramm, for the television coverage. Princess Armgard had also converted to Roman Catholicism like her granddaughter, but decided against attending the wedding. Irene and her mother spoke on the telephone before she left for the Basilica. Governmental fears that attendance at the wedding by the Dutch royal family might be construed as approval of Spanish politics made it impossible for the family to do anything else. The Dutch government had also vetoed the possibility of the wedding being held in the Netherlands. While it is said that Pope Paul VI had been asked to officiate at the wedding and declined, he did send the couple his special blessing before the ceremony. He received the newlyweds at a private Vatican audience after their wedding. Because she had failed to obtain the approval of the States-General to marry, Irene lost her right of succession to the Dutch throne. She agreed that she would live outside of the Netherlands.

In 1968, Princess Irene was libeled by the West German "rainbow press". The publications operated similarly to movie and television gossip magazines, with the exception being that instead of stories about film or television stars, the rainbow press wrote about royalty and their supposed secret lives. One of the publications printed a story that Irene had undergone an abortion with parental consent before she was married. Irene's father, Prince Bernhard, took the paper to court to clear his daughter's name. The court found in favor of father and daughter, ordering the newspaper to pay them both damages and to print a public apology.

After the wedding, Irene was very active in her husband's right-wing political cause, but over time they drifted away from right-wing extremism to left-wing sympathies and became a part of the international jet-set crowd. On 9 May 1977 Irene was expelled from Spain on the day after the death in Switzerland of her father-in-law, the Carlist claimant Xavier, Duke of Parma. Her husband Carlos Hugo, now the new Duke of Parma, Head of the House and Carlist claimant to the throne and an opponent of King Juan Carlos I, was also barred from the country for the same reason. Prince Carlos Hugo was allowed to return in late 1977, but Princess Irene was not permitted back in the country until April 1978. The prince, head of the Royal House of Bourbon-Parma, became a naturalized Spanish citizen in 1979. The couple had four children, but the marriage ended in divorce in 1981.

Having been married to the Duke of Parma, she is the only one of her sisters whose husband was of royal status. Her youngest sister, Princess Christina, later waived her rights to the throne when she married Jorge Guillermo, a United States citizen born in Cuba and a Roman Catholic.

== Since divorce ==
In 1980, Irene and her children returned to live in the Netherlands, initially moving back into Soestdijk Palace. She became involved in various personal development workshops. By 1981, she and her children had moved to their own home across the street from the palace, where Irene did traditional household chores like grocery shopping. In 1983 and 1985, she publicly spoke out against the additional deployment of NATO missiles at a large anti-nuclear rally in The Hague and with a letter to the newspaper De Volkskrant. Her connection with nature, that she says she had felt since childhood, intensified, and in 1995 she published her book Dialogue with Nature. The book outlined her philosophy that human beings are alienated from the natural world, but the Dutch media seized upon passages that recounted conversations she said she had with the trees and dolphins.

In 1999 Princess Irene purchased a farm near Nieu-Bethesda in South Africa, turning it into a sanctuary. In 2001, she helped establish the NatuurCollege in the Netherlands. She is also the founder of NatureWise, an organization that brings elementary school children in the Netherlands directly in touch with nature. The Princess is an honorary member of the Club of Budapest.

== Children ==
Carlos Hugo and Princess Irene had four children:

Name	Birth	Marriage		
Name	Birth	Date	Spouse	Issue
Prince Carlos, Duke of Parma	27 January 1970	Unmarried	Brigitte Klynstra	Carlos Hugo Klynstra, later Prince Hugo
Prince Carlos, Duke of Parma	27 January 1970	12 June 2010 (civil); 20 November 2010 (religious)	Annemarie Gualthérie van Weezel	Princess Luisa, Marchioness of Castell'Arquato; Princess Cecilia, Countess of Berceto; Prince Carlos Enrique, Prince of Piacenza
Princess Margarita, Countess of Colorno	13 October 1972	19 June 2001 (civil); 22 September 2001 (religious); Divorced 8 November 2006	Edwin de Roy van Zuydewijn	Without issue
Princess Margarita, Countess of Colorno	13 October 1972	3 May 2008; Separated 20 February 2023	Tjalling ten Cate	Julia ten Cate; Paola ten Cate
Prince Jaime, Count of Bardi	13 October 1972	3 October 2013 (civil); 5 October 2013 (religious)	Viktória Cservenyák	Princess Zita of Bourbon-Parma; Princess Gloria of Bourbon-Parma
Princess Carolina, Marchioness of Sala	23 June 1974	21 April 2012 (civil); 16 June 2012 (religious)	Albert Brenninkmeijer	Alaïa-Maria Brenninkmeijer; Xavier Brenninkmeijer

== Titles, styles, and honours ==
Styles of Princess Irene of The Netherlands
- Reference style: Her Royal Highness
- Spoken style: Your Royal Highness

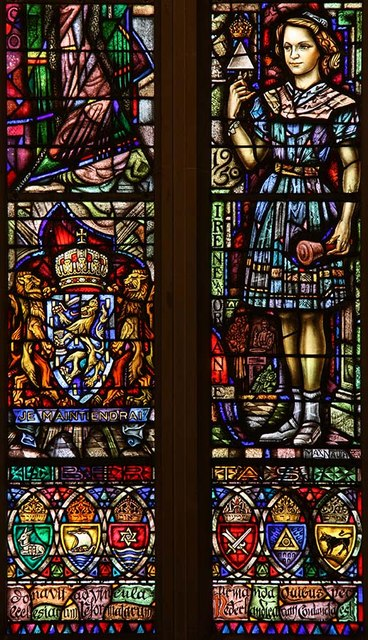
Princess Irene (window Dutch Church, Austin Friars in London)

=== Titles ===
Her official style is Her Royal Highness Princess Irene of the Netherlands, Princess of Orange-Nassau, Princess of Lippe-Biesterfeld. The Princess has used the following names since her divorce:

- Princess Irene of Lippe-Biesterfeld;
- Mrs (Mevrouw) van Lippe-Biesterfeld.

Princess Irene of the Netherlands House of Orange-Nassau Cadet branch of the House of Nassau Born: 5 August 1939
Titles in pretence
Preceded by Madeleine de Bourbon-Busset	— TITULAR — Queen consort of Spain; Carlist; 7 May 1977 – 7 January 1981	Vacant Title next held by Annemarie Gualthérie van Weezel
