= Peter Onu =

Nigerian diplomat (1931–1997)

Peter Onu (29 April 1931 – 17 January 1997) was a Nigerian Diplomat and philanthropist. He attained the position of Ambassador whilst serving as Assistant Secretary-General to the Organisation of African Unity. He also served as the political officer of the Nigerian Embassy in Moscow. He then served as the Acting Secretary-General of the Organisation of African Unity between 1983 and 1985. He succeeded Edem Kodjo OAU. He was educated at the University of Nigeria, Nsuka. He built a law library in Lagos State, Nigeria. Until his death, he served as an adviser to a few of Nigeria's military Heads of State.
