= Order of Prohibited Legitimacy =

Carlist order of chivalry

Order of Prohibited Legitimacy Ordine di Vietata Legittimità
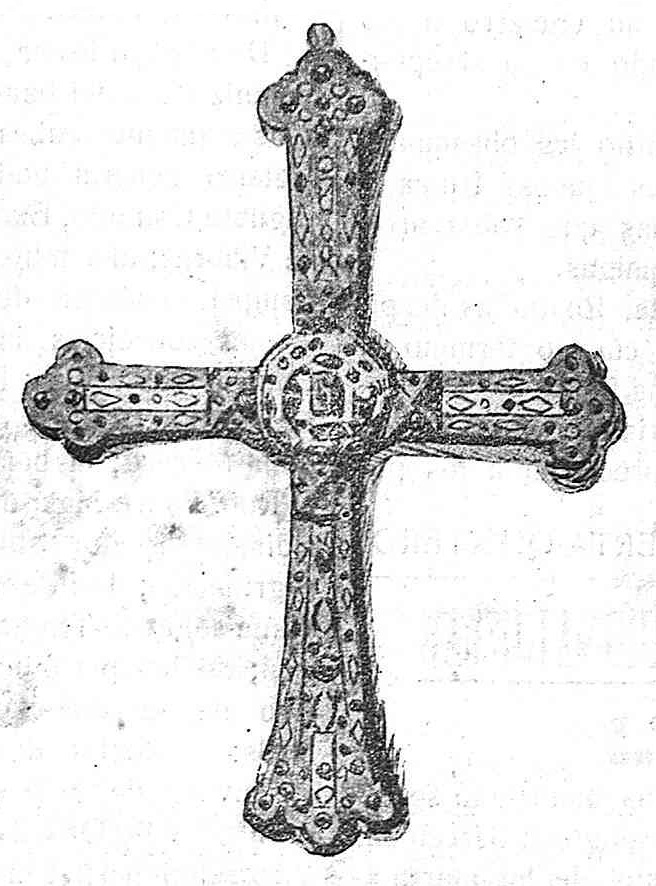
- The Cross of the Order of Prohibited Legitimacy

Awarded by The Carlist Pretender to the Spanish Throne
- Type: dynastic order
- Founded: 16 April 1923
- Royal house: House of Bourbon-Parma
- Ribbon
- Awarded for: Service to the Carlist Cause
- Status: Active
- Founder: Infante Jaime, Duke of Madrid
- Sovereign: Disputed: Prince Carlos, Duke of Parma; Prince Sixtus Henry of Bourbon-Parma

Statistics
- First induction: José Selva Mergelina, 5th Marquis de Villores

Precedence
- Next (higher): Order of Merit of Saint Louis
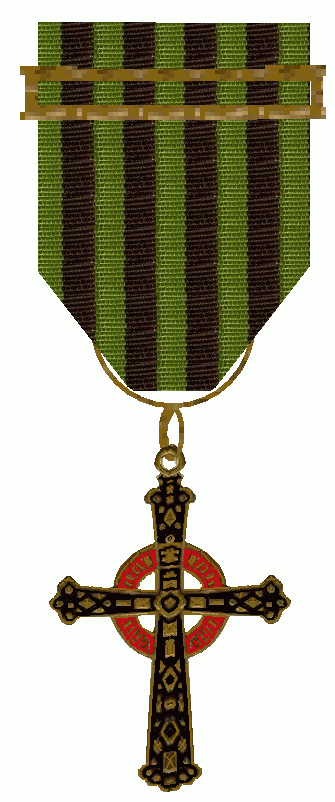
- Venera of the Order with its original design preserved by the branch in obedience to Prince Sixtus Henry of Bourbon-Parma

The Order of Prohibited Legitimacy (Italian: Ordine di Vietata Legittimità/Spanish: Orden de la Legitimidad Proscrita) is a Parmese dynastic order of knighthood originally awarded by the House of Bourbon-Parma to Carlist supporters. The order was founded in 1923 by Jaime de Borbón y de Borbón-Parma, a Carlist claimant to the Spanish throne and a Legitimist claimant to the French throne, for rewarding loyalists of the Carlist movement. In modern times, there are two branches of the Order. One branch's Grand Master is Prince Carlos, Duke of Parma while the other's is his uncle, Prince Sixtus Henry.

== History ==
The Order of Prohibited Legitimacy was created on 16 April 1923 by Jaime de Borbón y de Borbón-Parma; in Paris, he sent a letter to his political secretary José Selva Mergelina, 5th Marquis de Villores, explaining his creation of the order stating that it served to recognize "all those who by their sufferings or services become worthy of it." The Marquis de Villores was decorated with the Order soon after. By a Royal Decree on 8 December 1923, he granted it to Carlist loyalist youths and Julio de Urquijo e Ibarra, Count of Urquijo in Madrid.

Since the death of Jaime, the claimants to the Carlist dynastic legitimacy have acted as Grand Masters of the Order. Jaime was succeeded as Sovereign of the Order by his cousin, Alfonso Carlos de Borbón y Austria-Este in 1931. Alfonso died in 1936 without any male heir. His wife, Infanta Maria das Neves of Portugal, designated her nephew, Prince Xavier, Hereditary Duke of Parma, as his successor. Prince Xavier was succeeded by his son Prince Carlos Hugo, Hereditary Duke of Parma in 1977.

Prince Carlos Hugo, along with his sister Princess María Teresa, embraced Titoist socialism in the 1970s and sought to reform the Carlist Party. In 1979 he renounced his Carlist claims. In response, his traditionalist brother Prince Sixtus Henry of Bourbon-Parma, established himself as the Grand Master of the Order. In 2003, while in France, Prince Carlos Hugo re-asserted his Carlist claims and assumed the title Count of Montemolin, also bestowing the Carlist titles Duke of Madrid, Duke of San Jaime, and Duchess of Guernica upon his children. He reestablished himself as the Grand Master of the Order of Prohibited Legitimacy. His brother, Prince Sixtus Henry, and the supporters of his brother did not recognize the claim made by Carlos Hugo. Therefore, the order maintains two branches, one headed by Prince Sixtus Henry and the other by Prince Carlos Henry's successor, Prince Carlos, Duke of Parma.

== Insignia ==
The insignia of the Order of Prohibited Legitimacy consists of a Covadonga Cross hanging on a ribbon with vertical black and green bars. The ribbon is in a simpler form for gentlemen, and is decorated with a small rosette for officers and a large rosette for commanders.

== Recipients ==
=== Grand Masters ===
- Infante Jaime, Duke of Madrid (1923-1931)
- Infante Alfonso Carlos, Duke of San Jaime (1931-1936)
- Prince Xavier, Duke of Parma (1936-1977)
- Prince Carlos Hugo, Duke of Parma (1977-1979, 2003-2010; disputed after 1979)
- Prince Sixtus Henry, Duke of Aranjuez (1979–present; disputed)
- Prince Carlos, Duke of Parma (2010–present; disputed)

=== Knights ===
- José Selva Mergelina, 5th Marquis de Villores, Spanish Carlist politician
- Julio de Urquijo e Ibarra, Count of Urquijo, Spanish Carlist politician
- José Roca y Ponsa, Spanish Catholic priest
- Josep de Suelves i de Montagut, 9th Marquis de Tamarit, Spanish Carlist politician
- Esteban de Bilbao Eguía, Spanish Carlist and Francoist politician
- Ramón del Valle-Inclán, Spanish dramatist and novelist
- Melchor Ferrer Dalmau, Spanish historian and Carlist militant
- Claro Abánades López, Spanish journalist
- José Luis Zamanillo González-Camino, Spanish politician
- Dolores Gortázar Serantes, Spanish writer
- Manuel Fal Conde, 1st Duke of Quintillo, Spanish Carlist politician and Catholic activist
- Rafael Gambra Ciudad, Spanish philosopher and Carlist politician
- Juan María Bordaberry, President of Uruguay
- Osvaldo Lira, Chilean Catholic priest and theologian
- José María Zavala Castella, Spanish Partido Carlista politician
- José Miguel Gambra Gutiérrez, Spanish academic and politician
- Jose Maria Valiente Soriano, Spanish politician
- Princess Marie des Neiges of Bourbon-Parma, French aristocrat and scientist
