= Princess Carolina de Bourbon de Parme =

Princess Maria Carolina
- Marchioness of Sala
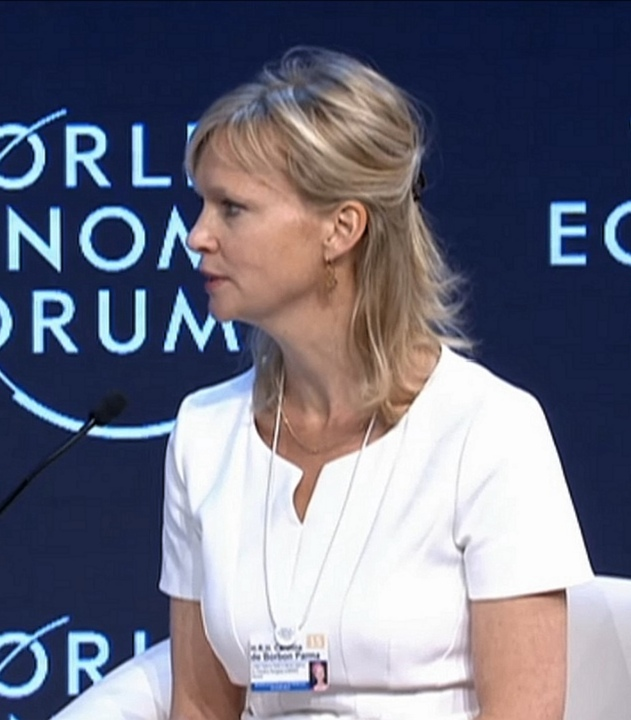
- Princess Maria Carolina in 2015
- Born: 23 June 1974 (age 52); Nijmegen, Netherlands
- Spouse: Albert Brenninkmeijer (m. 2012)
- Issue: Alaïa-Maria Brenninkmeijer; Xavier Brenninkmeijer
Names
- Dutch: Maria Carolina Christina de Bourbon de Parme; English: Marie Caroline Christine of Bourbon-Parma; Italian: Maria Carolina Cristina di Borbone-Parma
- House: Bourbon-Parma
- Father: Carlos Hugo, Duke of Parma
- Mother: Princess Irene of the Netherlands

Princess Carolina of Bourbon-Parma, Marchioness of Sala (born 23 June 1974), is the fourth and youngest child of Princess Irene of the Netherlands and Carlos Hugo, Duke of Parma. She is a member of the House of Bourbon-Parma as well an extended member of the Dutch royal family. Per a 1996 royal decree issued by Queen Beatrix, she is entitled to the style and title Her Royal Highness Princess Maria Carolina de Bourbon de Parme in the Netherlands as a member of the extended royal family.

== Early life ==
Princess Carolina was born at 23 June 1974 in Nijmegen. She has two older brothers, Prince Carlos, the head of the House of Bourbon-Parma, and Prince Jaime. She also has one older sister, Princess Margarita. She was baptised at the Castle of Lignières in France with Prince Claus of the Netherlands, Princess Christina of the Netherlands and Princess Marie des Neiges of Bourbon-Parma as her godparents.

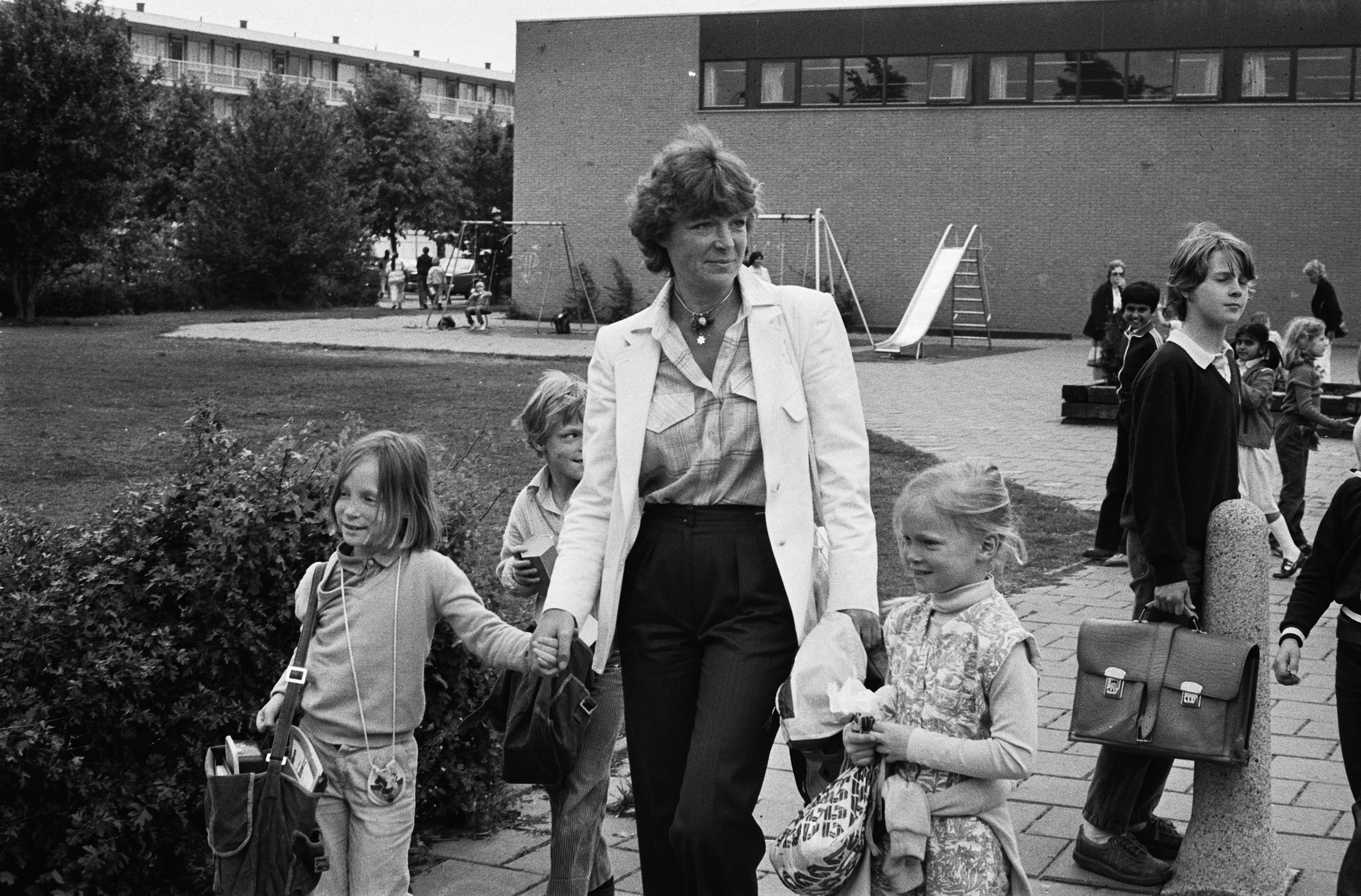
Carolina (right) coming from school, with her mother Irene and her sister Margarita (1981)

In 1981, when she was six, her parents decided to divorce. She moved together with her mother and her brothers and sister to Soest, nearby the then residence of her grandparents the former Queen, Queen Juliana of the Netherlands and Prince Bernhard of Lippe-Biesterfeld. Later on they lived for a while in a villa at Wijk bij Duurstede.

== Education and career ==
Princess Carolina studied political science at the University of Amsterdam and Harvard University, and also has an M.Sc. in Forced Migration from the University of Oxford. She has had a career at the United Nations. For this organisation she was stationed at the UN headquarters in New York City, as well as problematic areas such as Eritrea, the Gaza Strip, and in Aceh (Indonesia) after the 2004 Indian Ocean tsunami. She is currently [when?] employed at the United Nations in Geneva, in the Organisation for the Coordination of Humanitarian Affairs (OCHA).

== Marriage ==
On 9 January 2012, it was announced that Princess Carolina would marry Albert Alphons Ludgerus Brenninkmeijer (born 16 May 1974), a member of the wealthy Brenninkmeijer family. The civil marriage took place on 21 April 2012 at Wijk bij Duurstede, while the religious wedding took place at the San Miniato al Monte on 16 June 2012 in Florence, Italy. They had two children:

- Alaïa-Maria Irene Cécile Brenninkmeijer, born 20 May 2014 in Zurich, Switzerland. She had a double christening with her cousin Princess Zita Clara of Bourbon-Parma on 4 October 2014 at Noordwijk aan Zee in the Netherlands. Her godparents are Princess Margarita of Bourbon-Parma, Prince Constantijn of the Netherlands, Philippe Brenninkmeijer and Silvia Brenninkmeijer-Arboli.
- Xavier Albert Alphons Brenninkmeijer, born 16 December 2015 in Zurich.

== Other activities ==
The princess has been seen regularly at important events of the royal house of the Netherlands. In 2001 she was one of the maids of honor at the wedding of Prince Constantijn and Petra Laurentien Brinkhorst; and during the baptism of their daughter, Countess Eloise of Orange-Nassau, she was the godmother of the child. She was a witness at the church wedding of her cousin Prince Floris of Orange-Nassau, van Vollenhoven, and in 2010, was named as the godmother of Floris' second child, Eliane.

== Titles, styles and honours ==
Already a ducal princess from birth, her father bestowed the substantive title Marchesa di Sala (Marchioness of Sala) upon her on 2 September 1996. In 1996 she was incorporated into the Dutch nobility by her aunt Queen Beatrix, with the highest title of nobility Prinses de Bourbon de Parme (Princess of Bourbon-Parma) and styled Hare Koninklijke Hoogheid (Her Royal Highness). She does not belong to the House of Orange-Nassau or the limited Dutch royal house, but as a granddaughter of Queen Juliana and first cousin of the present King Willem-Alexander, she is officially a member of the more extended Dutch royal family.

Honours

- (Duchy of Parma) Ducal Family of Parma: Knight of the Parmese Sacred Military Constantinian Order of Saint George
- (Duchy of Parma) Ducal Family of Parma: Knight Grand Cross of the Order of Saint Louis for Civil Merit
- Netherlands: Recipient of the King Willem-Alexander Investiture Medal
