= Prince Carlos, Duke of Parma =

Head of the House of Bourbon-Parma since 2010

Prince Carlos
- Duke of Parma and Piacenza; Duke of Madrid
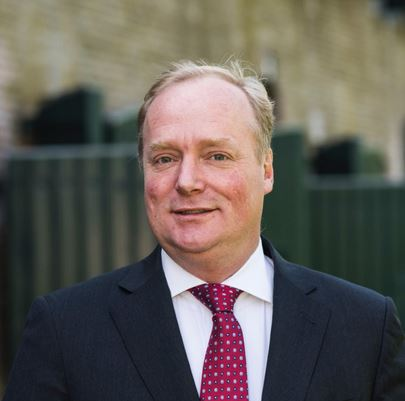
- Prince Carlos in 2024

Head of the House of Bourbon-Parma
- Tenure: 18 August 2010 – present
- Predecessor: Prince Carlos Hugo
- Heir Apparent: Prince Carlos Enrique
- Born: 27 January 1970 (age 56); Nijmegen, Netherlands
- Spouse: Annemarie Gualthérie van Weezel (m. 2010)
- Issue: Prince Hugo de Bourbon de Parme; Princess Luisa, Marchioness of Castell'Arquato; Princess Cecilia, Countess of Berceto; Prince Carlos Enrique, Prince of Piacenza
Names
- Dutch: Carlos Xavier Bernardo Sixto Marie de Bourbon de Parme; Spanish: Carlos Javier Bernardo Sixto María de Borbón-Parma y Orange-Nassau; Italian: Carlo Saverio Bernardo Sisto Maria di Borbone-Parma
- House: Bourbon-Parma
- Father: Carlos Hugo, Duke of Parma
- Mother: Princess Irene of the Netherlands

Prince Carlos, Duke of Parma and Piacenza (Carlos Xavier Bernardo Sixto Marie; born 27 January 1970) is the current Head of the House of Bourbon-Parma, which ruled the Duchy of Parma and Piacenza from 1748 to 1802 and from 1847 to 1859. He assumed the role upon the death of his father in 2010.

The eldest son of Carlos Hugo, Duke of Parma and Princess Irene of the Netherlands, Carlos is also a member of the Dutch royal family and the Dutch nobility with the style of "His Royal Highness" and the title of Prince Carlos de Bourbon de Parme. Additionally, he is the Carlist pretender to the Spanish throne with the title Duke of Madrid. In the French nobility, he bears the title "Prince de Borbon", and is the grand master of the Parmesan Sacred Military Constantinian Order of Saint George, the Order of Saint Louis for Civil Merit, the Order of Prohibited Legitimacy and the Order of St. George for Military Merit.

== Early life ==
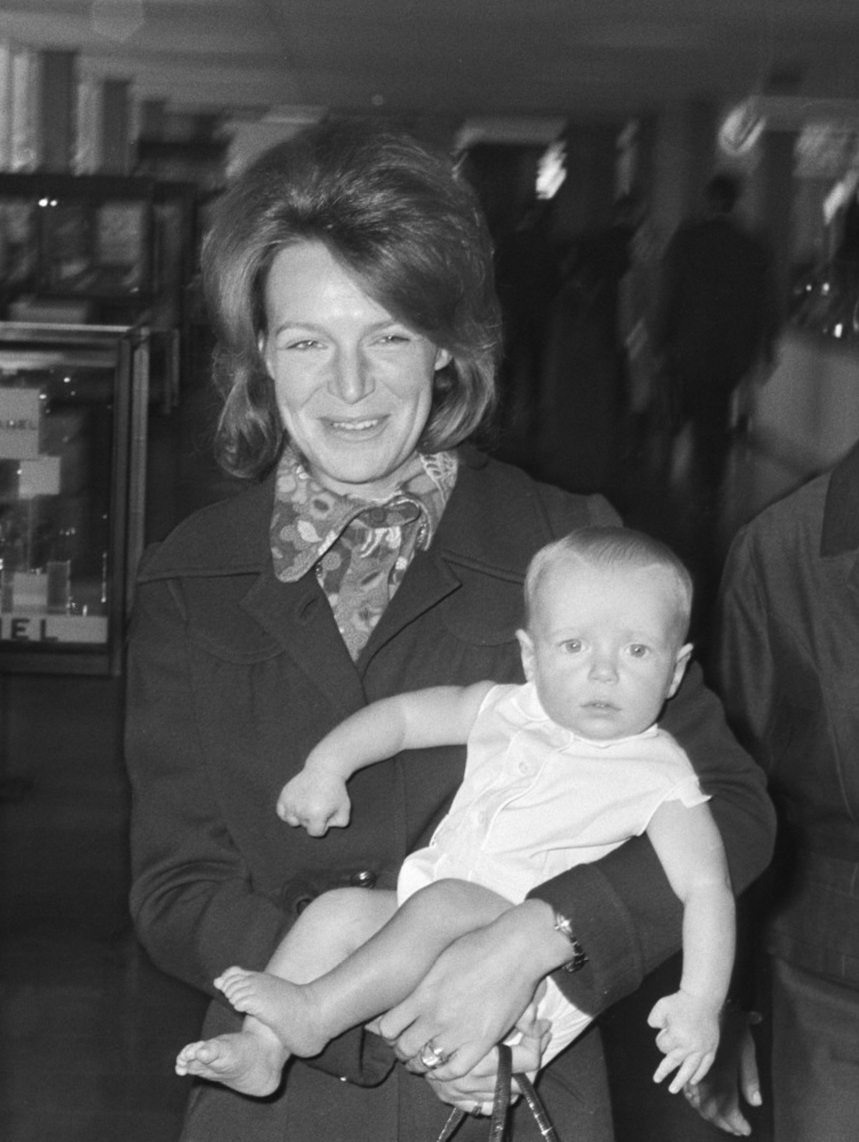
Prince Carlos with his mother Princess Irene, Duchess of Parma; 1970

Prince Carlos Xavier Bernardo Sixto Marie of Bourbon-Parma was born in Nijmegen, The Netherlands on 27 January 1970 as the elder child and son of Carlos Hugo, Duke of Parma, and his wife Princess Irene of the Netherlands. He was baptized in the Roman Catholic faith on 10 February 1970 by Cardinal Joseph-Charles Lefebvre.

He has two younger sisters, Princess Margarita and Princess Carolina, and a younger brother, Prince Jaime. At the time of his birth, his parents, Carlist Pretender to the Spanish throne, were expelled from Spain by the Franco regime since 20 December 1968, as Franco already did with his grandfather Prince Xavier of Bourbon-Parma and some members of his family on 25 November 1937.

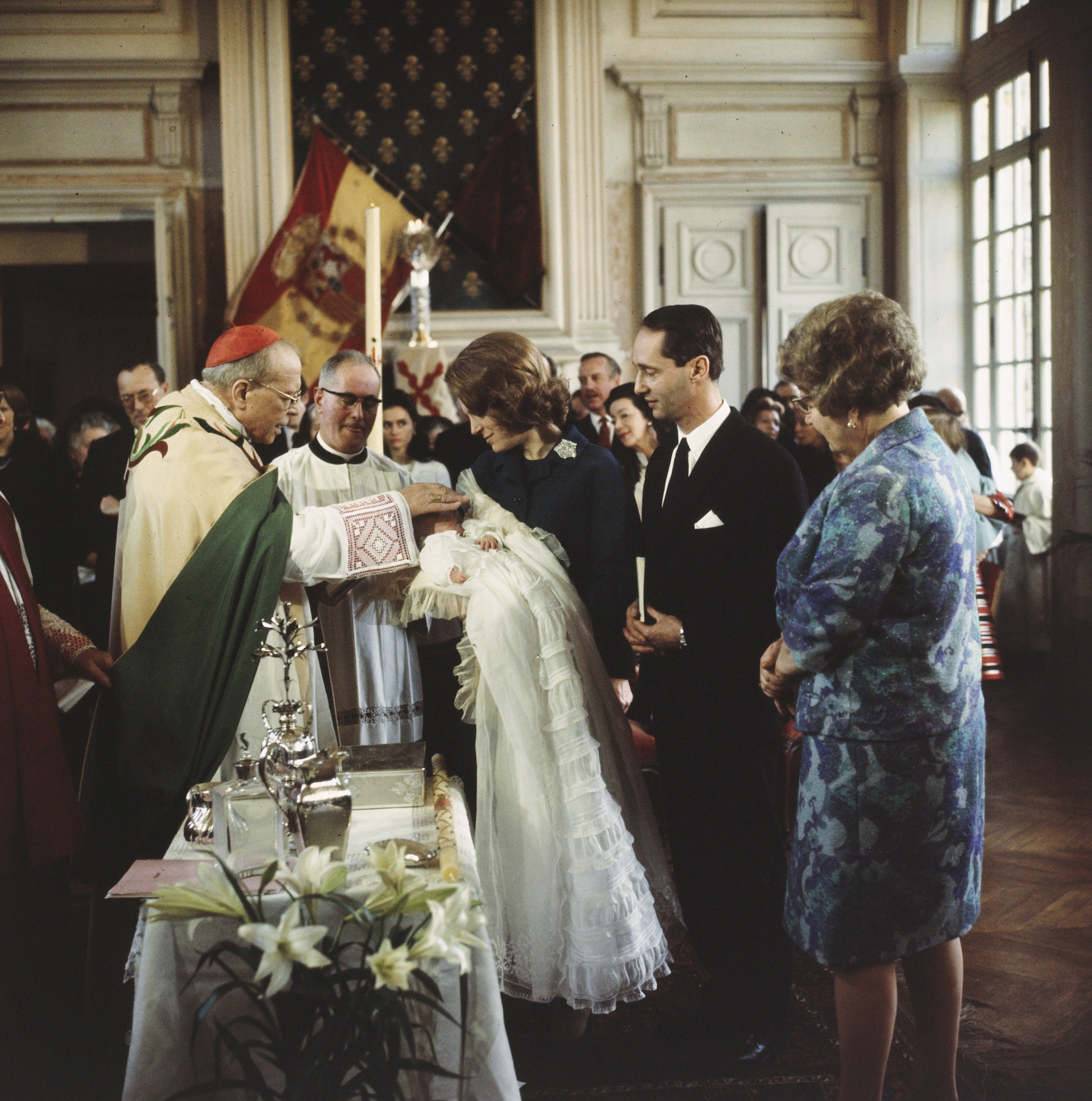
Prince Carlos' baptism in February 1970.

Carlos spent his youth in several countries including the Netherlands, Spain, France, England, and the United States. In 1981, when he was eleven, his parents divorced. Together with his mother and his siblings, he then moved to Soestdijk Palace (Baarn) in the Netherlands. He lived at the palace for a number of years with his maternal grandparents, Queen Juliana of the Netherlands and Prince Bernhard.

== Education and career ==
Prince Carlos studied political science at Wesleyan University in Connecticut and demography and philosophy at Cambridge University in England; in 1995, he obtained a Postgraduate Degree (MPhil) in Demography at the Cambridge University. He is fluent in Spanish, Dutch, French, Italian and English.

After completing his studies, Carlos worked for the company ABN AMRO in Amsterdam, where he was involved with preparations for the introduction of the euro. He then worked for a period in Brussels as a public affairs consultant for the company European Public Policy Advisors (EPPA).

He has chaired the Foundation for Cooperation for the Economic Development of Latin America, was a member for eight years of the Council of CSR Netherlands, which ensures corporate social responsibility. He was a non-executive director of "ASN Vermogensbeheer" and a member of the advisory board of PGGM Responsible Investing. He belongs to the Investment Committee of the Energiiq Fund of South Holland, is president of the Short Supply Chains Advisory Panel of the Dutch agricultural sector, and a collaborator of the think-tank The Ex'tax Project.

Since 2007, he has been engaged in projects concerning sustainability in the business world, advising projects worldwide focused on the circular economy, with alternative and environmentally friendly production methods and on the energy transition towards clean energies. He is also director of "Compazz", an independent foundation whose objective is to promote innovation and sustainability in the economic sector, acting as a bridge between the public, academic and private sectors, supported by its knowledge in Communication and management of conflict situations.

In 2021 he has published a book, Nothing in excess. Re-evaluating Nature, Economy and Life post Corona.

== Duties and appearances ==
=== Dutch Royal House ===
Carlos is sometimes present at representative occasions concerning the Royal House of the Netherlands. In 2003, he was involved, together with his aunt, Queen Beatrix, in the inauguration of the "Prince Claus Leerstoel", a professorship named after the Queen's husband, Prince Claus. During special events of the Royal House, he is regularly present. For example, he was one of the organizers of the wedding celebration of Prince Constantijn and Princess Laurentien.

In April 2013, Prince Carlos attended the inauguration of his cousin King Willem-Alexander and his wife Queen Maxima in Amsterdam. In August 2019 he and his wife attended the funeral of his aunt Princess Christina of the Netherlands, sister of former Queen Beatrix, near Noordeinde Palace, The Hague.

=== His rights as the Carlist pretender ===
After the death of his father Carlos Hugo in 2010, Prince Carlos Xavier succeeded him as Duke of Madrid and Carlist Pretender to the Spanish throne. He started to use the Carlist title of "Rey Don Carlos Javier I" (King Don Carlos Xavier I). However, Carlos Xavier, in an interview with the newspaper La Vanguardia, said:

I don't set out dynastic lawsuits.

— Barcelona, October 11th, 2010

=== Duke of Parma ===
Prince Carlos became Duke of Parma and Piacenza and Head of the House of Bourbon-Parma after the death of his father on 18 August 2010, aged 80.

In 2016, at the baptism of Prince Carlos Enrique, Prince Carlos conferred on his son the title of "Principe di Piacenza" (Prince of Piacenza), which is the traditional title assigned to the Crown Prince of the House of Bourbon-Parma, the continuer of the dynasty, and future Duke of Parma and Piacenza. In September 2017, the Duke of Parma named his daughter Princess Luisa as "Marchesa di Castell'Arquato" (Marquise of Castell'Arquato), and her younger sister Princess Cecilia was named as "Contessa di Berceto" (Countess of Berceto).

Prince Carlos has visited and regularly visits the lands of the former Duchy of Parma and Piacenza. In September 2015, he was in Parma to grant the "Prince's Medal to Meritorious Men in silver" to the firefighters who distinguished themselves during the 2015 flood that struck the area. In September 2016, he visited Palazzo Farnese in Piacenza, and in the same place he conferred some orders of the Royal House on people from Piacenza who have distinguished themselves for personal merits. At the end of September 2017, he presided over the General Chapter of the Knights of the House of Bourbon-Parma in Parma to confer the Ducal orders to those people who have achieved personal merits towards the Royal House; then he visited Palazzo della Pilotta. In September 2018, he visited Parma to confer some honors of the Royal House and to visit the Church of Santa Maria della Steccata, together with the Royal Family. Also, he was present at the inauguration of the opera season by attending a representation of the opera "Macbeth" at the Teatro Regio in Parma and made a visit to the Military Academy of Modena, received by the Commander.

As Duke of Parma, Prince Carlos is committed to preserving the memory of the lands and members and relatives of the dynasty: in July 2011 he was in Vienna to attend the funeral of Archduke Otto, the last Crown Prince of Austria-Hungary (son of Princess Zita of Bourbon-Parma, sister to Carlos' grandfather Prince Xavier) at the St. Stephen's Cathedral. In August 2016, Prince Carlos was in Romania to attend the funeral of Queen Anne (née Princess of Bourbon-Parma as a daughter of Prince René, brother of Carlos' grandfather) in Curtea de Argeș. At the funeral, Carlos represented also the Dutch Royal Family who was unable to attend. In June 2018 he traveled to Prague to remember his ancestor Maria Amalia, Duchess of Parma, and to take part in the presentation of the book "Maria Amalia Duchess of Parma and Piacenza (1746–1804)" dedicated to the life of his ancestor, and later visited the Cathedral of San Vito in Prague to lay flowers on the tomb of Duchess Maria Amalia. In May–June 2019, he visited Venice with his wife Annemarie at the invitation of the Sovereign Military Order of Malta: they were received at a dinner at Treves de Bonfili Palace, overlooking the Grand Canal; they also visited St Mark's Basilica and were received by the Patriarch of Venice, Francesco Moraglia.

== Personal life ==
=== Relationship with Brigitte Klynstra and son ===
Prince Carlos had a relationship with Brigitte Klynstra (born 10 January 1959), the stepdaughter of Count Adolph Roderik of Rechteren-Limpurg. During this relationship he fathered a son:

- Carlos Hugo Roderik Sybren Klynstra (born 20 January 1997 in Nijmegen).

In December 2015, the then 18-year-old Carlos Klynstra started the legal procedure to attempt to change his surname to that of his biological father which would also allow him to use the title of "Prince". The Duke of Parma opposed this on the basis that it was in contravention of the traditions of the House of Bourbon-Parma. On 9 March 2016 the Minister of Security and Justice declared his family name request valid. Later that year a court in The Hague concurred with the minister in declaring the claim valid under Dutch law.

According to the judgement, Carlos Hugo will be entitled to be known as "Zijne Koninklijke Hoogheid Carlos Hugo Roderik Sybren prins de Bourbon de Parme" (His Royal Highness Prince Carlos Hugo Roderik Sybren of Bourbon-Parma); this will come only into effect once the Dutch king has signed the royal decree. According to the press release of the Council of State of 28 February 2018, the name change does not mean that Klynstra is now also a member of the Royal House of Bourbon-Parma. That is a private matter of the House itself and this is outside the jurisdiction of the Dutch Nobility Law.

=== Marriage to Annemarie Gualthérie van Weezel ===
On 7 October 2009, it was announced through his mother's private secretary that Prince Carlos would marry Annemarie Cecilia Gualthérie van Weezel. The civil marriage took place on 12 June 2010 at Wijk bij Duurstede.

Annemarie (born The Hague, 18 December 1977) is a daughter of Johan (Hans) Stephan Leonard Gualthérie van Weezel and Gerarda Gezine Jolande (Ank) de Visser. Her father was a member of the House of Representatives of the Netherlands for the Christian Democratic party, the Dutch ambassador to the Council of Europe in Strasbourg, and the ambassador to Luxembourg. Gualthérie van Weezel's paternal grandfather was Jan Hans Gualthérie van Weezel, who was the head of the police in The Hague and member of the Dutch resistance during the Second World War. Annemarie Gualthérie van Weezel went to secondary school in Strasbourg and obtained a Master of Laws degree at the University of Utrecht. Subsequently, she completed a post-graduate study in Radio and Television journalism at the University of Groningen. Gualthérie van Weezel works as a parliamentary journalist in The Hague and Brussels for the Dutch public channel NOS. In Brussels, she met Prince Carlos for the first time.

On 2 August 2010, it was revealed that the health of his father, the Duke of Parma, was quickly deteriorating due to cancer. As a consequence, the church wedding of the prince Carlos and his fiancée was delayed. In a final announcement about his condition, the Duke confirmed Carlos as the next Head of the House of Bourbon-Parma. Just before his death the old Duke of Parma named Annemarie as "Condesa de Molina" (Countess of Molina). Prince Carlos's father died on 18 August 2010 in Barcelona, Spain, at the age of 80; Carlos subsequently became the next head of the House of Bourbon-Parma.

The new Duke of Parma and Annemarie were married on 20 November 2010 in La Cambre Abbey in Bruxelles. The wedding was attended by Máxima, Princess of Orange, Willem-Alexander, Prince of Orange, Queen Beatrix of the Netherlands, Prince Jean of Luxembourg, Princess Astrid of Belgium, Prince Lorenz of Belgium and Duarte Pio, Duke of Braganza.Together, they have two daughters and a son:

- Her Royal Highness Princess Luisa Irene Constance Anna Maria of Bourbon-Parma, Marchioness of Castell'Arquato (born on 9 May 2012 in The Hague); she was baptized at the Parma Baptistery, in Italy, in September 2012.
- Her Royal Highness Princess Cecilia Maria Johanna Beatrix of Bourbon-Parma, Countess of Berceto (born 17 October 2013 in The Hague); she was baptized at the Piacenza Cathedral, in Italy, in April 2014.
- His Royal Highness Prince Carlos Enrique Leonard of Bourbon-Parma, Prince of Piacenza (born 24 April 2016 in The Hague); he was baptised at the Parma Cathedral, in Italy, in September 2016.

== Titles, styles and honours ==
Styles of Carlos, Duke of Parma
- Reference style: His Royal Highness
- Spoken style: Your Royal Highness

=== Titles and styles ===
- 2 September 1996 – 18 August 2010: His Royal Highness The Prince of Piacenza
- 18 August 2010 – present: His Royal Highness The Duke of Parma and Piacenza
  - Officially in the Netherlands: 15 May 1996 – present: His Royal Highness Prince Carlos de Bourbon de Parme

=== Honours ===
==== Dynastic ====
As Head of the House of Bourbon-Parma, Carlos is Grand Master of four dynastic orders:

- Duchy of Parma and Piacenza:
  - Grand Master of the Parmese Sacred Military Constantinian Order of Saint George (Sacro Angelico Imperiale Ordine Costantiniano di San Giorgio)
  - Grand Master of the Order of Saint Louis for Civil Merit (Real Ordine del Merito sotto il titolo di San Lodovico)
  - Grand Master of the Order of Saint George for Military Merit (Ordine al merito militare di San Giorgio)
  - Grand Master of the Order of Prohibited Legitimacy (Orden de la Legitimidad Proscrita)

==== National ====
- Netherlands:
  - Recipient of the King Willem-Alexander Investiture Medal
  - Recipient of the Wedding Medal 2002 (The Prince of Orange and Miss Máxima Zorreguieta)

==== International ====
- San Marino:
  - Grand Cross of the Order of San Marino
- Sovereign Military Order of Malta:
  - Knight of Honour and Devotion of the Order of Saint John
  - Knight Grand Cross of the Order of Merit

== Notes ==
Prince Carlos, Duke of Parma House of Bourbon-Parma Cadet branch of the House of Bourbon Born: 27 January 1970
Titles in pretence
Preceded by Carlos Hugo	— TITULAR — Duke of Parma; 2010 – present Reason for succession failure: Annexed by Kingdom of Italy	Incumbent; Heir: Hereditary Prince Carlos
Preceded by Carlos Hugo	— TITULAR — King of Spain; Carlist claimant 2010–present	Incumbent; Heir: Hereditary Prince Carlos
Lines of succession
Preceded by Prince Alessandro of Bourbon-Two Sicilies	Legitimist line of succession to the French throne 29th position	Succeeded by Hereditary Prince Carlos
