= Prince Henry, Count of Bardi =

Count of Bardi (1851–1905)

Henry
- Count of Bardi
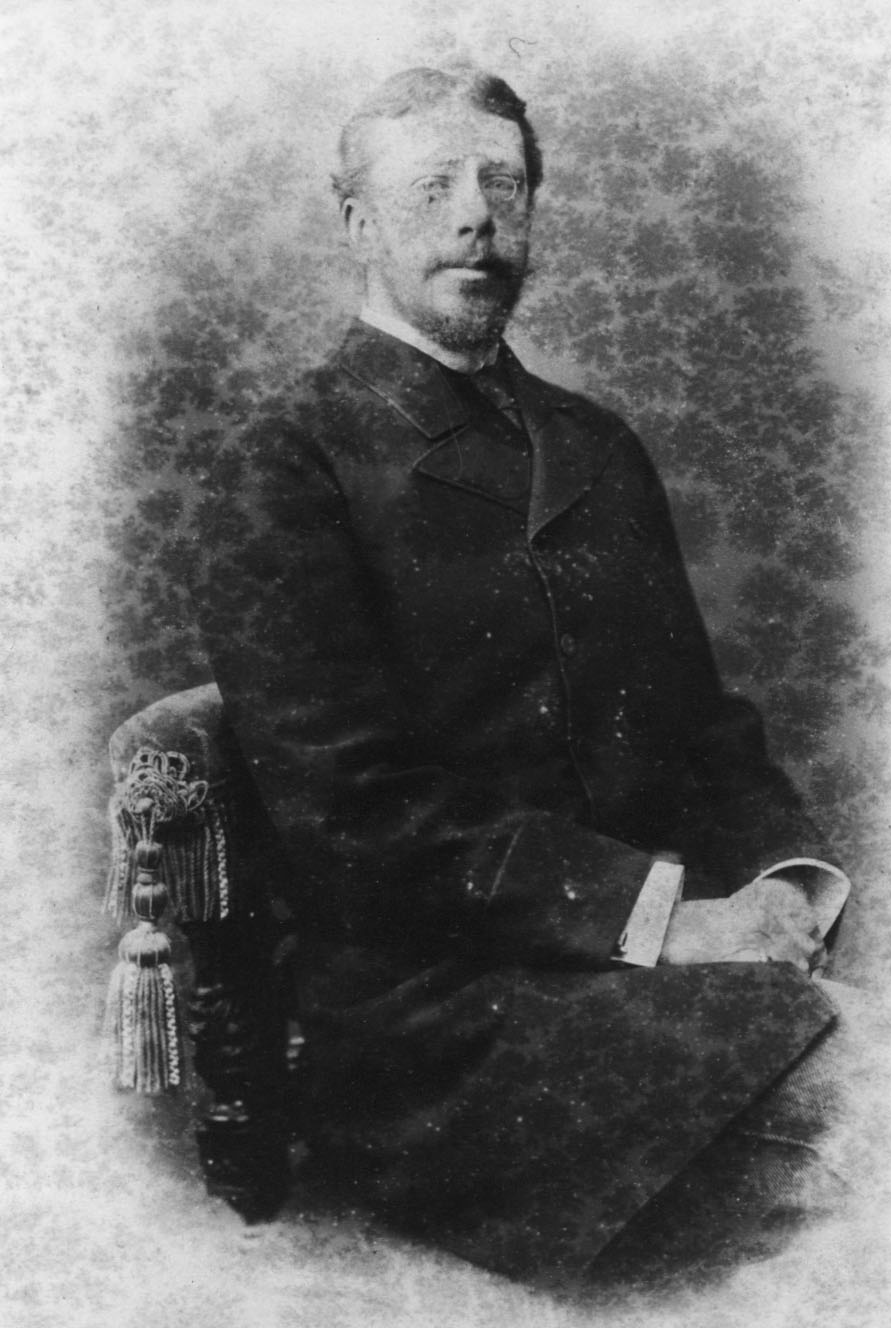
- Born: 12 February 1851; Parma, Duchy of Parma
- Died: 14 April 1905 (aged 54); Menton, France
- Spouse: Princess Maria Luisa of Bourbon-Two Sicilies (m. 1873; died 1874) Infanta Adelgundes, Duchess of Guimarães (m. 1876)
Names
- Italian: Enrico Carlo Luigi Giorgio; French: Henri-Charles-Louis-Georges
- House: House of Bourbon-Parma
- Father: Charles III, Duke of Parma
- Mother: Princess Louise Marie Thérèse of France
- Religion: Roman Catholicism

Prince Henry of Bourbon-Parma, Count of Bardi (Italian: Enrico Carlo Luigi Giorgio, Principe di Parma, Conte di Bardi) (12 February 1851 in Parma – 14 April 1905 in Menton, France) was the youngest son and child of Charles III, Duke of Parma, and Princess Louise Marie Thérèse of France, the eldest daughter of Charles Ferdinand, Duke of Berry, and Princess Caroline Ferdinande Louise of the Two Sicilies.

Henry was thus the great-grandson of Charles X of France. He was also the nephew of Henri, comte de Chambord, disputedly King of France and Navarre from 2 to 9 August 1830 and afterwards the Legitimist Pretender to the throne of France from 1844 to 1883.

== Marriages ==
Henry married firstly to Princess Maria Luisa of Bourbon-Two Sicilies, youngest daughter of Ferdinand II of the Two Sicilies and his wife Maria Theresa of Austria, on 25 November 1873 in Cannes, France. Maria Luisa died eight months later at the age of 19. The couple had no issue.

Henry married secondly to Infanta Adelgundes of Portugal, Duchess of Guimarães, fifth child and fourth daughter of Miguel of Portugal and his wife Adelaide of Löwenstein-Wertheim-Rosenberg on 15 October 1876 in Salzburg, Austria. This union was also without issue; Adelgundes' nine pregnancies all ended in miscarriages.

== Residences ==
Henry and Adelgundes were the owners of the palazzo Ca' Vendramin Calergi on the Grand Canal in Venice. They hosted the family of Richard Wagner at their palazzo beginning in September 1882, and the famous German composer died there the following February.

== Ancestry ==
Ancestors of Prince Henry, Count of Bardi

8. Louis I of Etruria
4. Charles II, Duke of Parma
9. Maria Luisa, Duchess of Lucca
2. Charles III, Duke of Parma
10. Victor Emmanuel I of Sardinia
5. Maria Theresa of Savoy
11. Maria Theresa of Austria-Este
1. Henry, Count of Bardi
12. Charles X of France
6. Charles Ferdinand, Duke of Berry
13. Maria Theresa of Savoy
3. Louise of Artois
14. Francis I of the Two Sicilies
7. Maria Carolina of Naples and Sicily
15. Maria Clementina of Austria
