= Princess Louise d'Artois =

Duchess of Parma and Piacenza from 1849 to 1854

Louise d'Artois

Duchess consort of Parma and Piacenza
- Tenure: 19 April 1849 – 27 March 1854

Regent of Parma and Piacenza
- Regency: 27 March 1854 – 9 June 1859
- Monarch: Robert I
- Born: 21 September 1819; Élysée Palace, Paris, France
- Died: 1 February 1864 (aged 44); Palazzo Giustinian, Venice, Lombardy-Venetia
- Burial: Kostanjevica Monastery, Nova Gorica, Slovenia
- Spouse: Charles III, Duke of Parma (m. 1845; died 1854)
- Issue: Infanta Margherita, Duchess of Madrid; Robert I, Duke of Parma; Alice, Grand Duchess of Tuscany; Prince Henry, Count of Bardi
Names
- French: Louise Marie Thérèse d'Artois; Italian: Luisa Maria Teresa d'Artois
- House: Bourbon
- Father: Prince Charles Ferdinand, Duke of Berry
- Mother: Princess Marie Caroline of Naples and Sicily

Louise d'Artois (21 September 1819 – 1 February 1864) was the last Duchess of Parma, as the wife of Duke Charles III from 1849 until his death in 1854. She was the eldest daughter of Charles Ferdinand, Duke of Berry, younger son of King Charles X of France, and Princess Caroline of Naples and Sicily. Louise served as regent of Parma during the minority of her son from 1854 until 1859. She aided the development of Parma's independence from Austria by asking the end of the Austrian military occupation. The duchy of Parma was annexed and the ducal family were ousted during the Franco-Austrian War of 1859, and they retired to Austrian protection in Venice. She died in 1864.

== Life ==
=== Early life ===
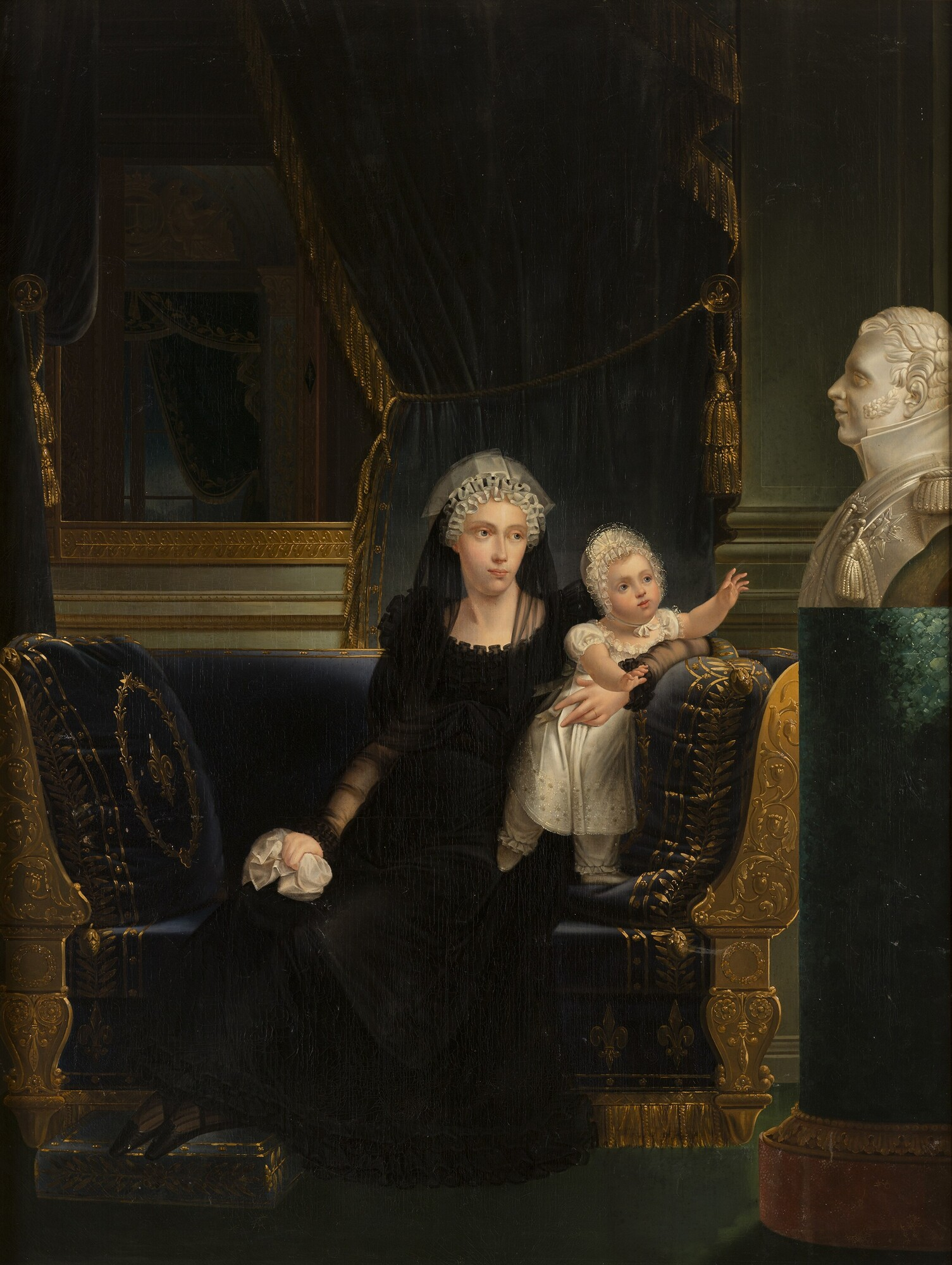
Marie-Caroline holding her infant daughter Louise (portrait by François Kinson, 1820)

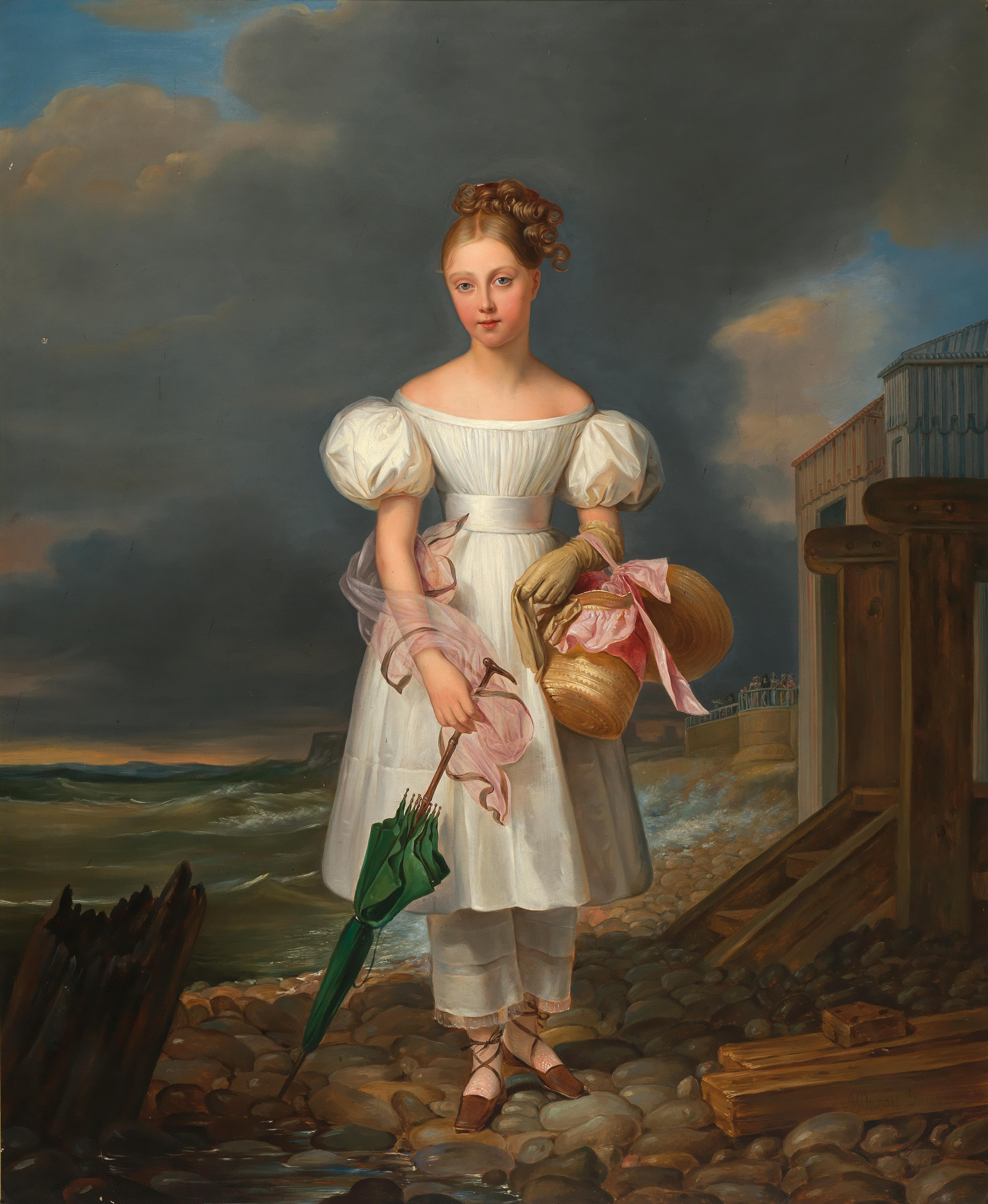
Portrait by Alexandre-Jean Dubois-Drahonet, 1830

Born on 21 September 1819 in the Élysée Palace, in Paris, she was the first surviving child of Charles Ferdinand, Duke of Berry and his young wife Carolina of Naples and Sicily. At the time of her birth, her great-uncle Louis XVIII, was the reigning king of France, but he was childless and already in declining health. Louise's grandfather was the heir to the French crown. He had only two sons. The elder, Louis Antoine, Duke of Angoulême had no children of his own by his marriage to Madame Royale. Therefore, the continuity of the dynasty rested solely on the younger son, Charles-Ferdinand, Duke of Berry, Louise's father.

Known from her birth as Mademoiselle d'Artois, Louise did not have the chance to get to know her father. She was only five months old when the Duke of Berry was assassinated while leaving the old opera of Paris by Louis Pierre Louvel, a Bonapartist whose goal was the "extinction of the house of Bourbon". Louise was then the only child of the main branch of the royal dynasty of Bourbon descendants of Louis XV. The lack of male heirs raised the prospect of the throne passing to the Duke of Orléans and his heirs, which horrified the more conservative ultras. Parliament debated the abolition of the Salic law, which excluded females from the succession and was long held inviolable. However, the widowed Duchess of Berry was found to be pregnant and on 29 September 1820 gave birth to a son, Louise's only sibling, the miracle boy Henri d'Artois (1820-1883). He received then the title of Duke of Bordeaux.

Louise was brought up under the care of her mother the Duchess of Berry at the Elysée Palace and at Château de Rosny-sur-Seine, her mother's main residence. Louise's education was entrusted to Marie-Joséphine Louise de Montaut-Navailles, Marquise de Gontaut Saint-Blacard, a former Lady-in-waiting of the Duchess of Berry. The Marquise was appointed as the governess of the little girl and her brother. Until the end of her life, Louise would remain very close to her brother, later describing their relationship as one soul in two bodies.

Louise would remember her great-uncle King Louis XVIII as an invalid who could not move from his chair. He suffered from gangrene and died in 1824, five days before Louise's fifth birthday. During the reign of Charles X, as a granddaughter of the French king, Louise had the title petite-fille de France (granddaughter of France). Her grandfather's reign (1824-1830) ended abruptly as his unpopular policies launched the July Revolution. On 2 August 1830, Charles X and his son the Dauphin abdicated their rights to the throne. Although Charles had intended that his grandson, the Duke of Bordeaux, would take the throne as Henry V, the politicians who composed the provisional government instead placed on the throne a distant cousin, Louis Philippe of the cadet House of Orléans – a descendant of Louis XIV's only brother - who agreed to rule as a constitutional monarch. This period became known as the July Monarchy. Supporters of the exiled senior line of the Bourbon dynasty became known as Legitimists. On 16 August 1830, the royal family went into exile in England.

=== Formative years ===
The Duke of Bordeaux and Princess Louise in exile in Prague, by Charles Achille d'Hardiviller, around 1834.

When her grandfather abdicated in 1830, Louise joined the rest of her immediate family in exile, taking refuge in the United Kingdom. For a time the Duchess of Berry and her children lived in Bath, but they later moved in order to be closer to Charles X who had settled in Scotland, at the Palace of Holyrood. The Duchess of Berry settled with her two children at 11 (now 12) Regent Terrace but did not find conditions in Edinburgh agreeable, nor did she accept her son's exclusion from the throne by the Orléanist "King of the French". She declared her son to be the legitimate king, and herself to be regent. In 1831 she left Edinburgh, and returned to her family in Naples via the Netherlands, Prussia, and Austria. In April 1832 she landed near Marseille. Receiving little support, she made her way to the Vendée and Brittany, where she succeeded in instigating a brief but abortive insurrection in June 1832. However, her followers were defeated. The Duchess of Berry was arrested in Nantes, then imprisoned in the Château of Blaye where she gave birth to a child born out of a secret morganatic marriage. The subsequent scandal led to the Duchess losing all her prestige. Twelve-year-old Louise and her brother were then entrusted to their aunt, the Duchess of Angoulême "Madame the Dauphine", the only surviving child of Louis XVI and Marie Antoinette.

The family left Scotland in 1832 for Prague, in Bohemia, where Emperor Francis I of Austria offered them the Prague Castle. In 1836 they moved to the palace of Grafenberg in Görz in the Austrian Empire. There, the former King Charles X died of cholera soon after. Remarried and living in Brunnsee castle, in Eichfeld (200 km from Vienna), the Duchess of Berry never recovered the custody of her children. Louise and her brother were raised by their aunt in an austere and formal atmosphere according to the custom of the old regime.

Short, plump, and blonde with slightly bulging blue eyes, Louise resembled her father. She was witty, chatty, and with a strong character. She liked music, playing the harp, and singing. She adored her brother and they were very close. Both siblings became attached to their aunt, the Duchess of Angoulême, who, although severe, was devoted to them. They annually received the visit of their mother, the Duchess of Berry, who lived nearby and provided them with four half-siblings. After the death of their uncle the Duke of Angoulême in 1844, the siblings moved with their aunt to Schloss Frohsdorf, a baroque castle just outside Vienna.

=== Marriage ===
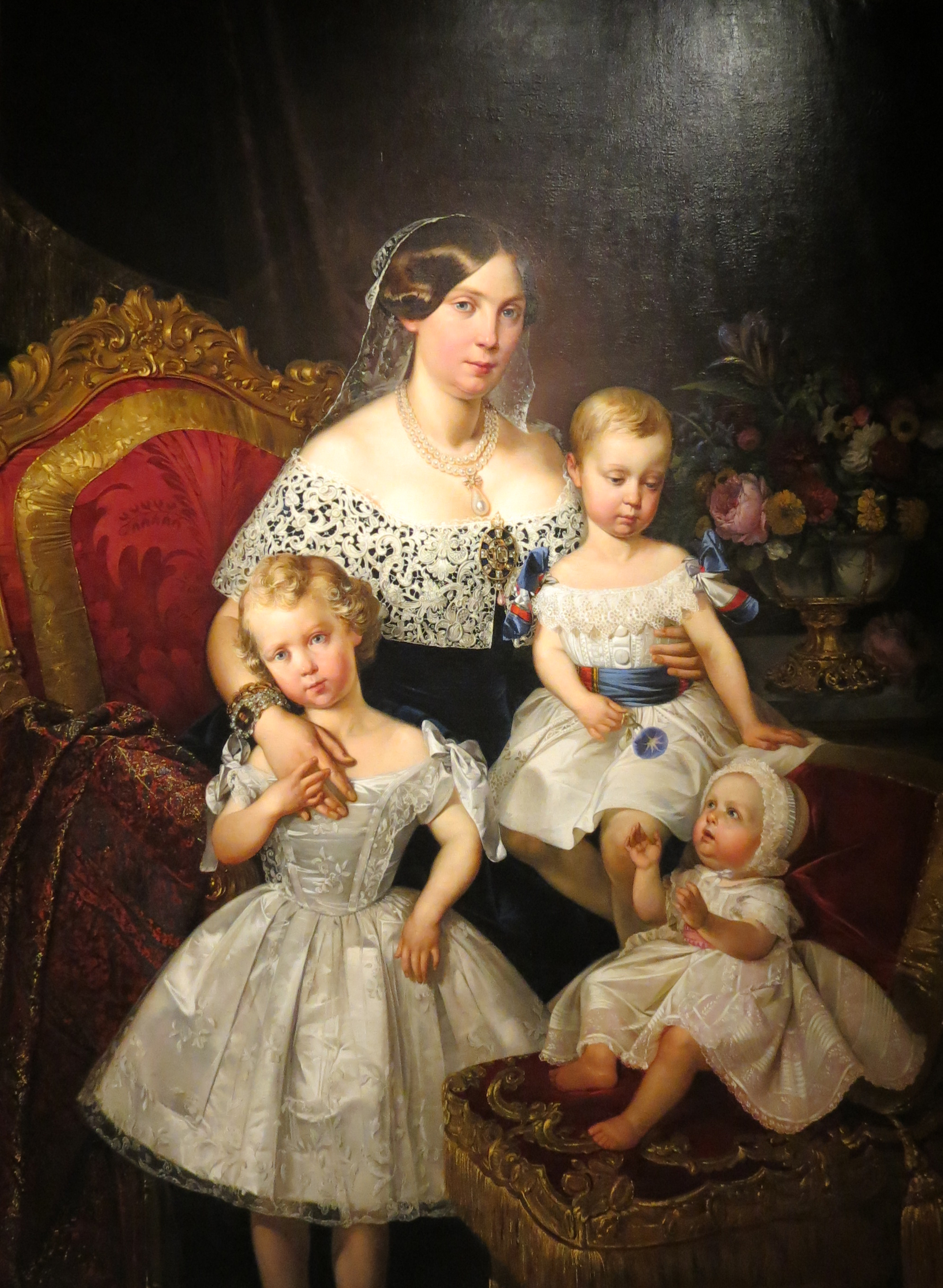
Princess Louise and her children Margherita (left), Roberto (right) and the baby Alice, around 1850, by Prosper Raffi.

In 1832, King Ferdinand II of the Two Sicilies, half-brother of the Duchess of Berry, had proposed to marry his younger brother, Prince Antonio, Count of Lecce who was 16 years old, to Louise who was then 13. The project fizzled. The Duchess of Angoulême, the princess' guardian, declined this proposal. Besides the young age of the princess, the prince of the Two Sicilies was her uncle and only a younger brother in a large family with little prospects, and in spite of his youth, the Count of Lecce already had a deserved reputation as a womanizer. He would have a tragic end. The Duchess of Angoulême also discarded the idea of marrying her niece to any Austrian Archduke. She was adamant that Louise should marry a Bourbon. As there were very few princes to choose from, Louise reached twenty-five still unmarried and at an advanced age for a single Princess of her time. Finally in 1845, the Duchess of Angoulême arranged her marriage to Hereditary Prince Ferdinand Charles of Lucca. A few years younger than her, Ferdinand was the only child of the reigning Duke of Lucca. He used to spend some summers near Frohsdorf and they had met when they were still children.

On 10 November 1845, at Schloss Frohsdorf in Austria, Louise married Hereditary Prince Ferdinand Charles of Lucca. On 17 December 1847 Empress Marie Louise died and Louise's father-in-law succeeded as Charles II, Duke of Parma. The Duchy of Lucca was incorporated in the Grand Duchy of Tuscany, and she and her husband became known as Hereditary Prince and Hereditary Princess of Parma.

Her father-in-law was Duke of Parma for a few months. In March 1848 revolution broke out in Parma supported by King Charles Albert of Sardinia. Ferdinand Charles escaped from Parma, but was taken prisoner at Cremona. He remained a prisoner at Milan for several months until the British government negotiated his release. After a brief sojourn on the island of Malta, he traveled to Naples and then Livorno where he was joined by Louise Marie Thérèse who had just given birth to their first son. Then the family sought refuge in England and Scotland.

In August 1848 the Austrian army entered Parma, and officially restored Charles II. Ferdinand Charles and his family, however, remained in England, since hostilities continued between the Austrian and Piedmontese armies. For several years Charles II had considered abdicating in favour of Ferdinand Charles, but he delayed in the hope that when he did so things would be more secure for his son.

=== Public role as Duchess and Regent ===
Louise with her son Roberto in 1854, by Giulio Carlini

On 24 March 1849, the abdication of Charles II was announced. Ferdinand Charles, still living in England, succeeded him under the name Charles III. On 18 May 1849, Louise's husband re-entered Parma, but he left again two days later. He did not take over the administration of the duchy until 25 August.

Duchess Louise was described as a very agreeable, clever and sensible by Queen Victoria. Parma was a little independent monarchy, and there was no real established tradition about what the role of a consort should look like. During her father-in-law reign, Louise mother-in-law retired completely from the court of Lucca, settling permanently first in Villa di Marlia and later to her villa at Pianore, where surrounded by priest and nuns, she dedicated her life to religion. At first, Princess Louise was rarely seen in public and her life centered around the supervision of her children's upbringing, correspondence with her birth family in exile, and religious devotion. Eventually, after the exile of 1848-1849, she started to play an important representation role.

When her husband was murdered in 1854, Louise served as regent for their young son, the new duke, Robert I. She became very popular in Parma and known Europe for her charity and her strong will.

Like the other rulers of the Central Italian states, she and her son were ousted during the Franco-Austrian War of 1859, and they retired to Austrian protection in Venice. Various schemes following the war, either for her and her son's restoration in Parma, or territorial swaps which might leave them ruling over Tuscany, Modena, or the Romagna, came to nothing, as the whole of central Italy was annexed by Piedmont in March 1860. Louise lived out the remainder of her life in exile at Wartegg Castle in Switzerland.

Queen Sophie of the Netherlands met Louise Marie in 1862 and described her in a letter to a friend:

The other day I made the acquaintance of the Duchesse de Parme, Count Chambord's sister. She is much larger than Princess Mary of Cambridge, very small, but lively, agreeable, without bitterness after so many misfortunes. Her boys are dwarfs but full of French repartie and gaiety. I liked her and pity such a lot—murder and revolutions persecuting her since birth...

=== Death ===
According to The Month, Louise caught a cold while staying in Venice in January 1864. The Month stated that this cold was soon followed by typhus, which in turn resulted in Louise's death on February 1 of the same year. She died on 1 February 1864, aged 44, in the Palazzo Giustinian in Venice. She was buried in her grandfather Charles X's crypt at the Franciscan Kostanjevica Monastery in Görz, Austria (now Nova Gorica, Slovenia).

Other members of the French Royal Family buried there include her brother Henri, Count of Chambord, her aunt Marie Thérèse of France, and her uncle Louis Antoine, Duke of Angoulême.

== Children ==
Louise and Charles had four children, including Robert I of Parma.

- Margherita (1847–1893)

∞ Prince Carlos, Duke of Madrid, Carlist claimant to the Spanish throne, also Legitimist claimant to the French throne, had issue.

- Roberto, Duke of Parma (1848–1907)

∞ Princess Maria Pia of the Two Sicilies (daughter of King Ferdinand II of the Two Sicilies and Maria Theresa of Austria), had issue.
∞ Infanta Maria Antónia of Portugal (daughter of King Miguel I of Portugal and Adelaide of Löwenstein-Wertheim-Rosenberg), had issue.

- Alicia of Parma (1849–1935)

∞ Ferdinand IV, Grand Duke of Tuscany, had issue.

- Enrico, Count of Bardi (1851–1905), no issue.

∞ Princess Luisa Immacolata of the Two Sicilies (daughter of King Ferdinand II of the Two Sicilies and Maria Theresa of Austria).
∞ Infanta Adelgundes of Portugal, Duchess of Guimarães (daughter of King Miguel I of Portugal and Adelaide of Löwenstein-Wertheim-Rosenberg).

== Honours ==
- Austria: Dame of the Order of the Starry Cross
- Spain: Dame of the Order of Queen Maria Luisa, 20 November 1823

== Gallery ==
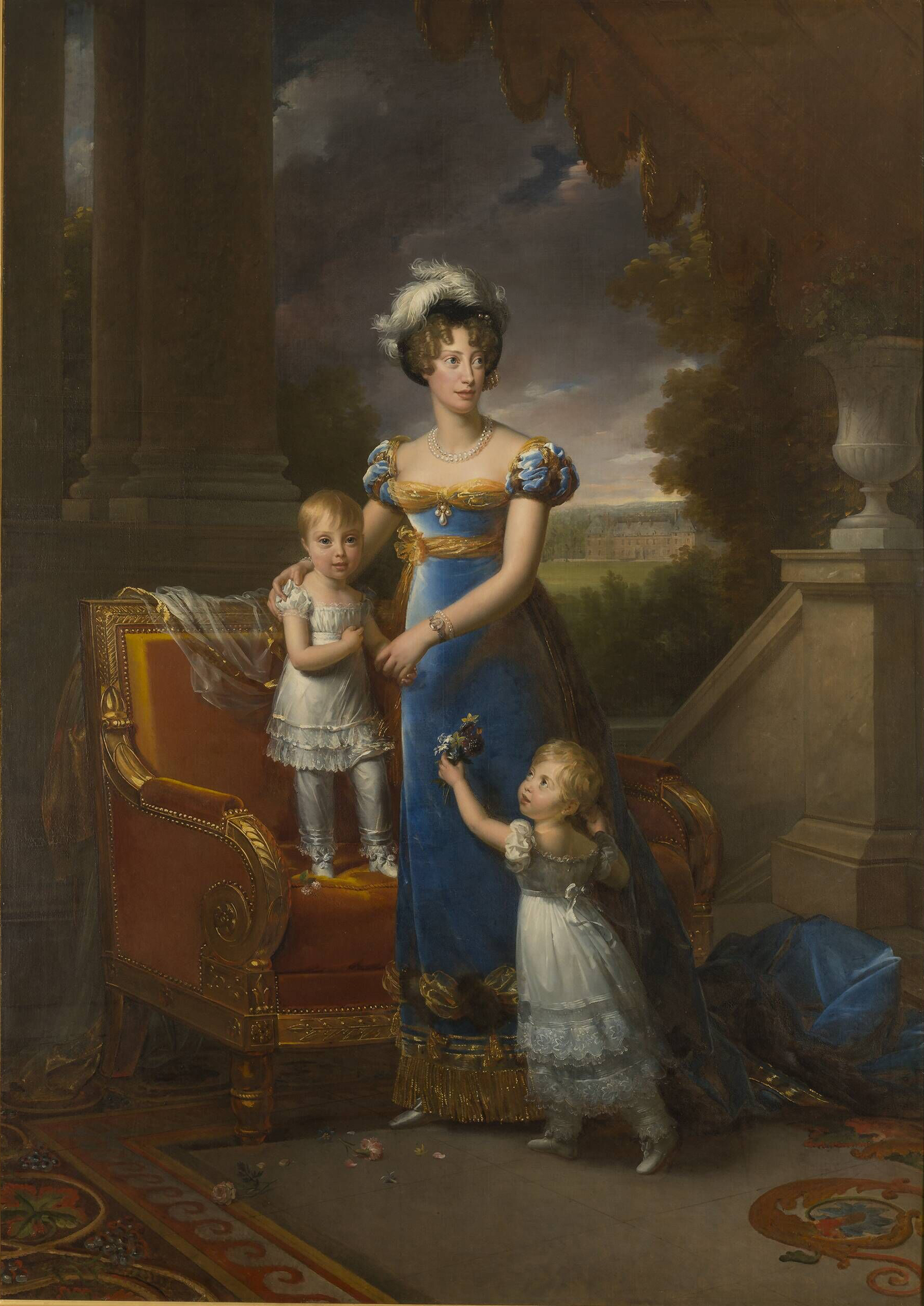
The Duchess of Berry and Her Children by François Gérard, 1822

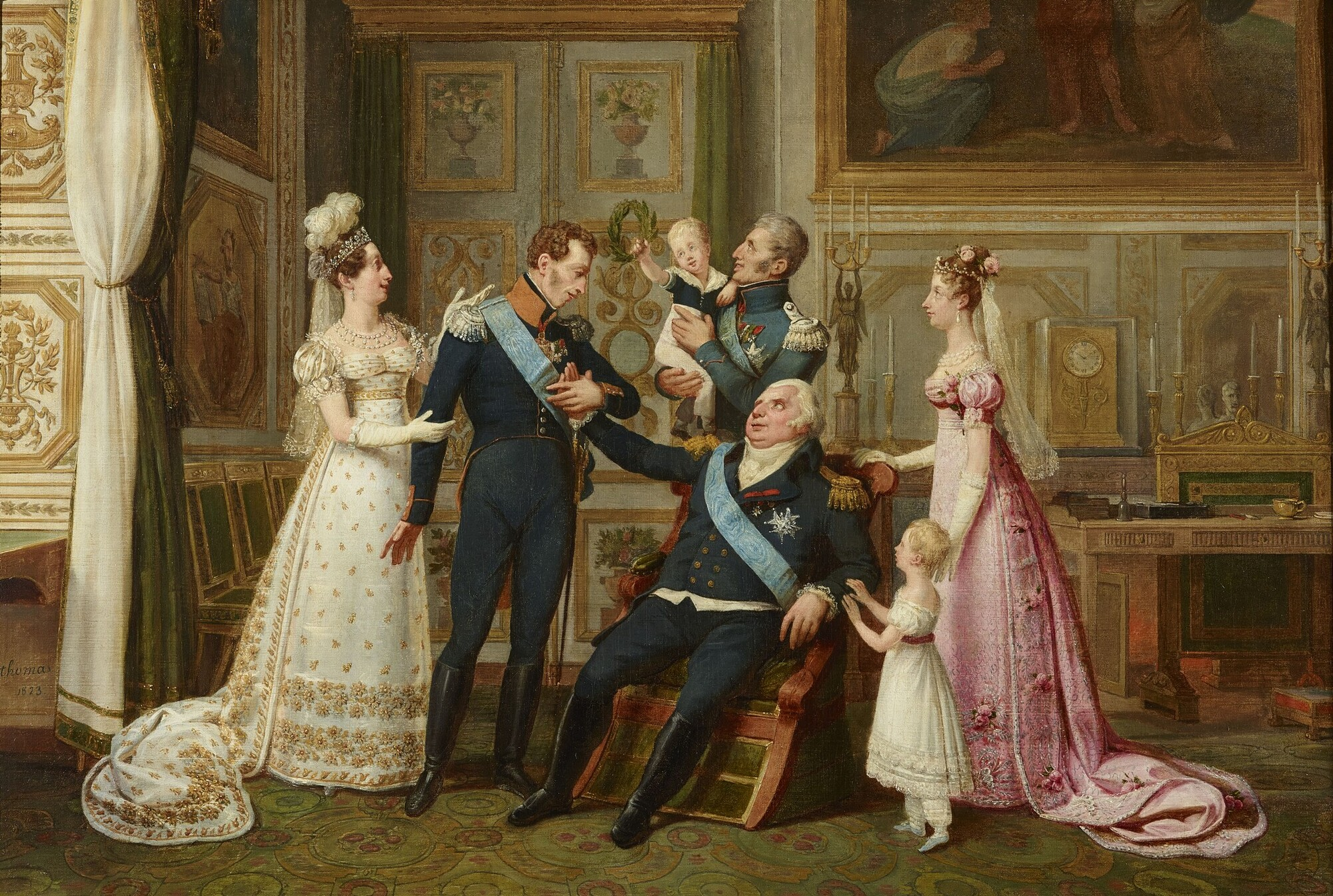
Louis XVIII Receiving the Duke of Angoulême on His Return from the Spanish Campaign by Antoine Jean-Baptiste Thomas, 1823. Louise is with her mother on the right of the painting.

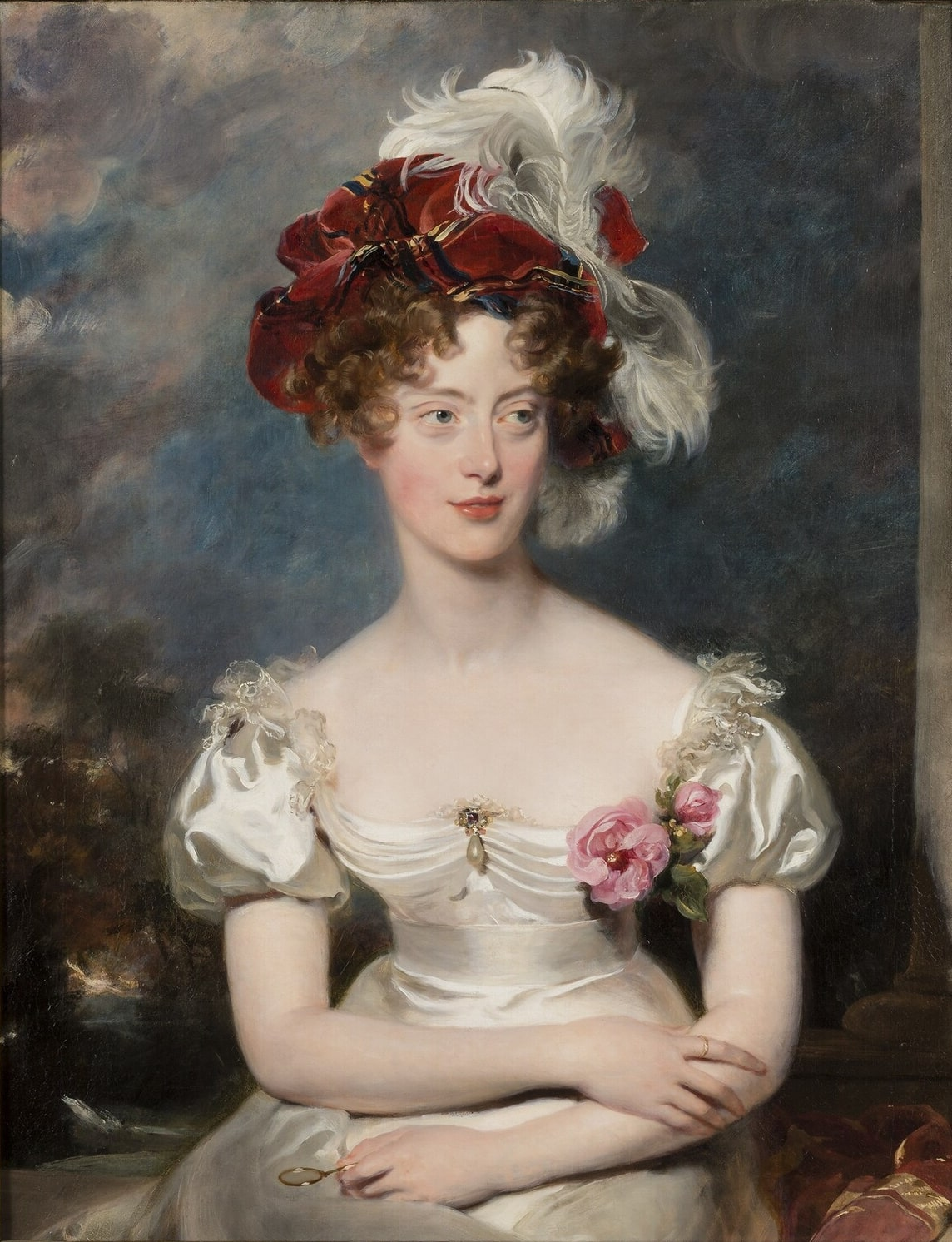
Portrait of the Duchess of Berry by Thomas Lawrence, 1825. A painting of Princess Louise's mother

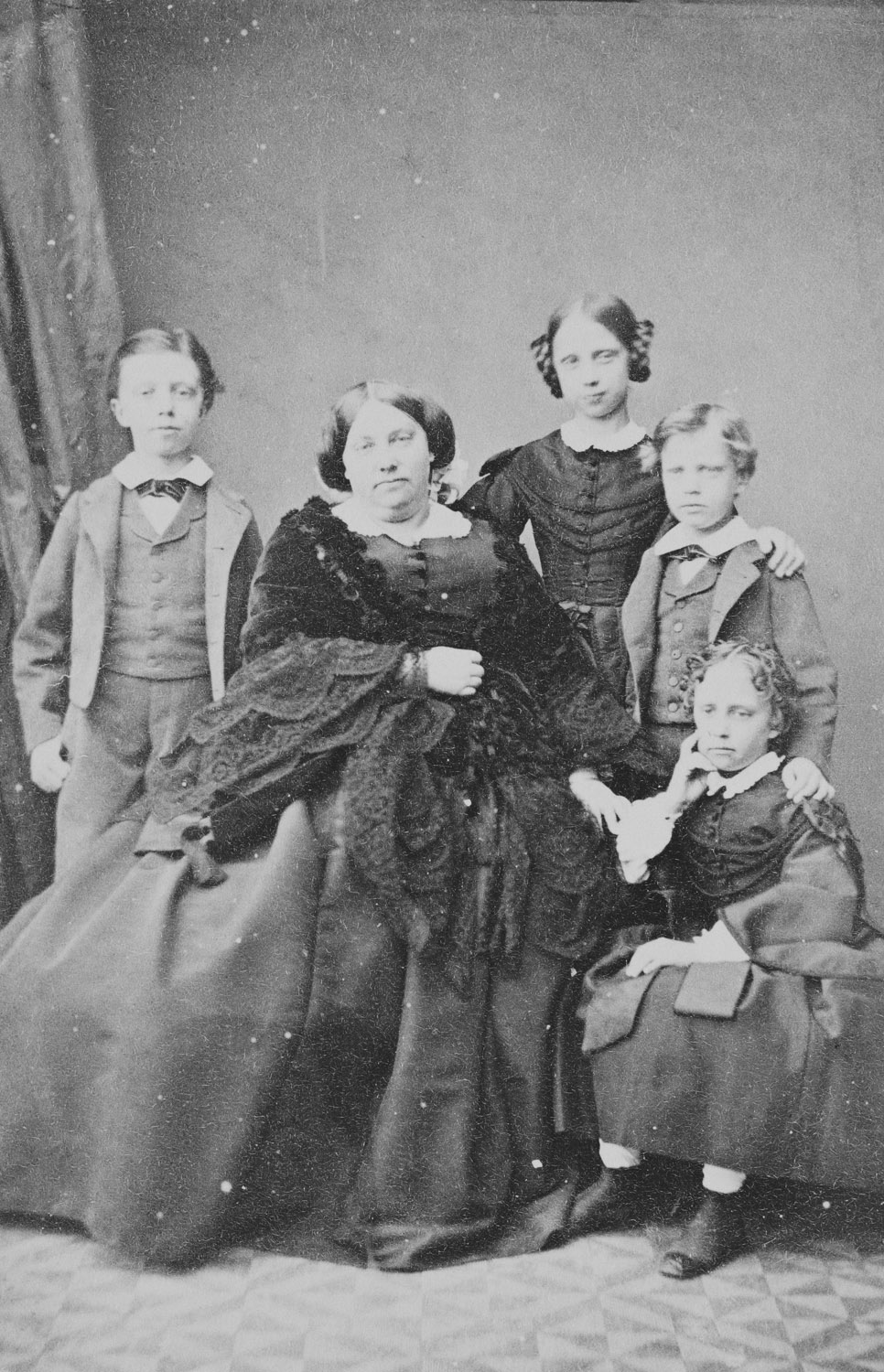
Photograph of Louise Marie Thérèse, Duchess of Parma with her four children, ca. 1860s

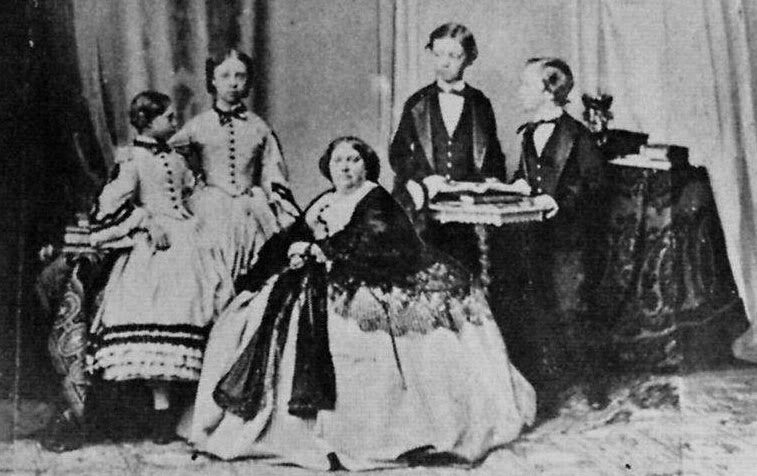
Photograph, ca. 1860s

Princess Louise d'Artois House of Bourbon Cadet branch of the Capetian dynasty Born: 21 September 1819 Died: 1 February 1864
Royal titles
Preceded by Princess Maria Teresa of Savoy	Duchess consort of Parma and Piacenza; 19 April 1849 – 27 March 1854	Succeeded by Princess Maria Pia of the Two Sicilies (titular)
