= Charles III of Parma =

Duke of Parma and Piacenza from 1849 to 1854

Charles III
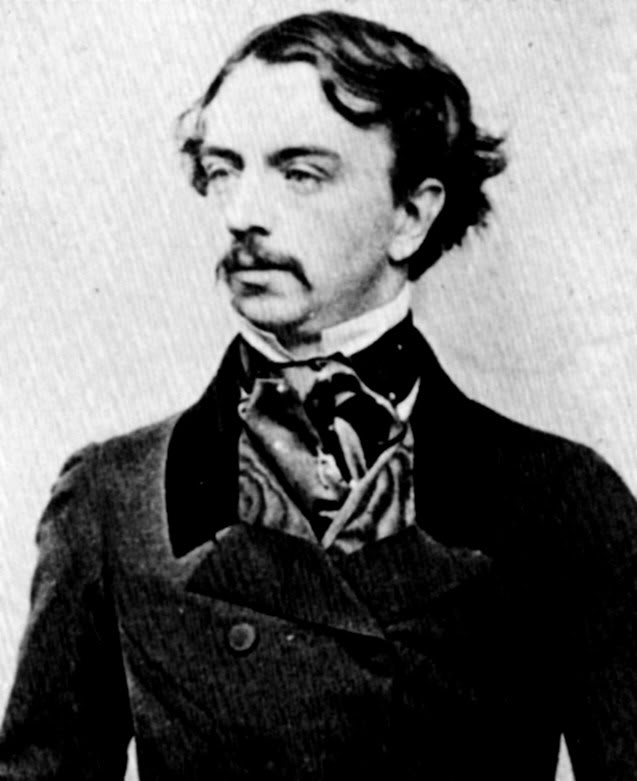
- Charles III c. 1852

Duke of Parma and Piacenza
- Reign: 17 May 1849 – 27 March 1854
- Predecessor: Charles II
- Successor: Robert I
- Born: 14 January 1823; Villa delle Pianore, Capezzano Pianore, Duchy of Lucca
- Died: 27 March 1854 (aged 31); Parma
- Burial: Cappella della Macchia, Villa Borbone, near Viareggio
- Spouse: Princess Louise d'Artois (m. 1845)
- Issue: Infanta Margaret, Duchess of Madrid; Robert I, Duke of Parma; Alice, Grand Duchess of Tuscany; Prince Henry, Count of Bardi
Names
- Italian: Ferdinando Carlo Giuseppe Maria Vittorio Baldassare
- House: Bourbon-Parma
- Father: Charles II, Duke of Parma
- Mother: Maria Teresa of Savoy

Charles III (Italian: Carlo III di Borbone, Duca di Parma e Piacenza; 14 January 1823 – 27 March 1854) was the duke of Parma from 1849 to 1854.

He was the son of Duke Charles II of Parma and was educated in Saxony and Vienna. He grew up as a restless young man and traveled extensively while he was the hereditary prince of Lucca. For a time he served in the Piedmontese army with the rank of captain. In 1845, his father arranged his marriage with Princess Louise d'Artois, a wealthy heiress who gave him four children. In December 1847, at the death of Empress Marie Louise, his father became the reigning duke of Parma, but abdicated on 24 March 1849. Charles III became the duke of Parma, Piacenza and the Annexed States.

Charles III owed his throne to the support of Austrian troops. He placed Parma under martial law, inflicted heavy penalties on the members of the late provisional government, closed the university, and instituted a regular policy of persecution. His authoritarian policies made him unpopular. After reigning only five years, he was assassinated in March 1854.

== Early life ==
Charles III was born at the Villa delle Pianore near Lucca on 14 January 1823, the son of Charles Louis, Prince of Lucca, (later Duke of Lucca, and Duke of Parma) and his wife Princess Maria Teresa of Savoy (daughter of King Victor Emmanuel I of Sardinia). He was given the baptismal names Ferdinando Carlo Vittorio Giuseppe Maria Baldassarre. Until his accession as Duke of Parma in 1849, he was called Ferdinando Carlo or Ferdinando. His family called him Danduccio. At the death of his grandmother, Maria Luisa of Spain, Duchess of Lucca, on 13 March 1824, Ferdinando became the Hereditary Prince of Lucca.

Ferdinando Carlo spent much of the first ten years of his life following his parents in their frequent travels to their castles of Urschendorff and Weistropp, near Dresden, and to the court in Vienna. When he was four, the responsibility for his education was entrusted to a Hungarian priest, Zsigmond Deáki. He was taught Italian history and language by Lazzaro Papi, Director of the Library of Lucca. He learnt Spanish, French, Hungarian, German and English.

Until 1833, when he was ten and the court returned to Lucca, Ferdinando Carlo was under the care of his mother in an austere and religious atmosphere. As an only child, Ferdinando Carlo was much loved by his parents, but they were a mismatched couple of opposite personalities: Ferdinando’s mother was very pious and turned increasingly towards religion. From his teens, Ferdinando saw little of her. Maria-Theresa retired completely from the court of Lucca, living in permanent seclusion, first in Villa di Marilia and later to her villa at Pianore, where surrounded by priest and nuns, she dedicated her life to religion. Ferdinando had more in common with his father: a skill for languages, a passion for travel, a coarse sense of humor and a restless nature. However, Charles Louis was a hedonistic man who could not have his son as company very often or for very long. As a consequence, Ferdinando grew up restless and very spoiled. His teachers could control neither his rebellious nature nor his unbridled irresponsibility.

In his adolescence, Ferdinando Carlo developed an interest in military life. He entered the army in Lucca living as a simple soldier, sharing the life in the barracks, hours in the training grounds and lengthy exercises among the foothills of the Apennines. He was well regarded by his soldiers. To regulate his military training, and hoping that the army would improve his character, Ferdinando's father obtained permission from Charles Albert of Sardinia to admit him in the Piedmontese army. In 1841, at age eighteen, Ferdinando Carlo was sent to the Military School of Turin. He received a commission in the Piedmontese army with the rank of captain in the Novara Cavalry. However, after one year of service, he returned home on bad terms with King Charles Albert of Sardinia and even more so with the king's son, Victor Emmanuel, who had spent a lot of time with him. Victor Emmanuel wrote: " Ferdinando of Lucca left here last summer rather angry with me and he has not let me know his news since. But I wish him every happiness—and also good sense, which however I firmly believe he would never achieve."

== Marriage and issue ==
In 1845, as the duchy of Lucca was in great financial need, Ferdinando's father decided to marry him to a princess with a large dowry. The bride chosen was Princess Louise d'Artois (1819–1864), the only sister of the Legitimist pretender to the throne of France, the Comte de Chambord. She was the daughter of Charles Ferdinand, Duke of Berry and the granddaughter of King Charles X of France. Ferdinando Carlo, who was 22 years old at the time, was initially reluctant to marry her. She was four years older than him; she was his close relative; and he disliked the ideology of her entourage, the legitimist party. He would have rather waited three more years to marry, finding then a bride more of his liking. However, as his father threatened to cut his privy purse, leaving him completely destitute, Ferdinando ended up agreeing with the idea.

Ferdinando Carlo and Louise were cousins and they had known each other since they were children in Vienna. Their wedding took place on 10 November 1845 at Schloss Frohsdorff, Chambords's home in exile, near Lanzenkirchen in Austria, some 30 miles outside of Vienna. Their honeymoon took them to castle Urschendorff in Austria, and afterwards to England, a country where Ferdinand Carlo felt most at ease. The couple's married life was happy for some years. Their first child was born thirteen months after the wedding and three more children followed in quick succession:

- Princess Margaret of Bourbon-Parma (1 January 1847 – 29 January 1893): she married Carlos, Duke of Madrid, on 4 February 1867. They had five children.
- Robert I, Duke of Parma (9 July 1848 – 16 November 1907): he married Princess Maria Pia of Bourbon-Two Sicilies on 5 April 1869. They had twelve children. He remarried Infanta Maria Antónia of Portugal on 15 October 1884. They had twelve children.
- Princess Alice of Bourbon-Parma (27 December 1849 – 16 November 1935): she married Ferdinand IV, Grand Duke of Tuscany, on 11 January 1868. They had ten children.
- Prince Henry, Count of Bardi (12 February 1851 – 14 April 1905): he married Princess Maria Immacolata of Bourbon-Two Sicilies on 25 November 1873. He remarried Infanta Adelgundes of Portugal on 15 October 1876.

Louise was described at that time as a pretty blonde, fair complexioned with golden hair and blue eyes, but not very tall. She was reserved, cold, insensitive and lacked charm. Like most legitimists, her political ideas were those of the preceding century. However, for the first years of their married life, Ferdinando was happy with her.

Until he became duke of Parma, Ferdinando was known as il Duchino, the little Duke, a reference to both his stature and his status as his father's heir. Although he was tall, he was slight built. His hair was thick and dark and he had big prominent eyes. A large nose, a long neck and a receding chin completed his face. He had a trimmed, finely proportioned figure, of which he was very proud. He was a dandy who dressed smartly and was very fastidious about his clothing. Ferdinando Carlo travelled a great deal. Outside Italy, he often used the title Marchese di Castiglione; in Italy, he often used the title Conte di Mulazzo.

== Acquisition of Parma ==
On 17 December 1847 Empress Marie Louise died and Ferdinando Carlo's father succeeded as Duke Charles II of Parma. The Duchy of Lucca was incorporated in the Grand Duchy of Tuscany, and Ferdinando Carlo ceased being Hereditary Prince of Lucca becoming instead Hereditary Prince of Parma.

Charles II only reigned for a few months in Parma. In March 1848 revolution broke out in Parma supported by King Charles Albert of Sardinia. Ferdinando Carlo escaped from Parma, but was arrested in Cremona and taken as a prisoner in Milan where he remained for several months until the British government negotiated his release. At this time he was described by a contemporary as "Tall and slim with an open and merry countenance, a light-hearted, light-headed, careless young man". After a brief sojourn on the island of Malta, he traveled to Naples and then Livorno where he was joined by his wife Louise who had just given birth to their first son while in exile in Florence. Then the family sought refuge in England. They settled in a cottage at Surbiton, south-west of London. Disraeli, who met him at this time, described Ferdinando as "a very droll man, exceedingly amusing and clever—a rattle, a mimic and gamboled in mind and body. He was a great tumbler and skilfully in all tour de force. Walking with the Queen at Windsor, I believed for the first time, he suddenly tumbled before Her Majesty the whole way she walked. She died with laughter and astonishment. He was less like a tyrant than any person I ever met; full of fun and humor".

On 5 April 1849 the Austrian army entered Parma, and officially restored Charles II, who was in exile in Saxony. Ferdinando Carlo and his family, however, remained in England, since hostilities continued between the Austrian and Piedmontese armies. For several years Charles II had considered abdicating in favor of Ferdinando Carlo, but he delayed it in the hope that when he did so things would be more secure for his son.

== Reigning Duke ==
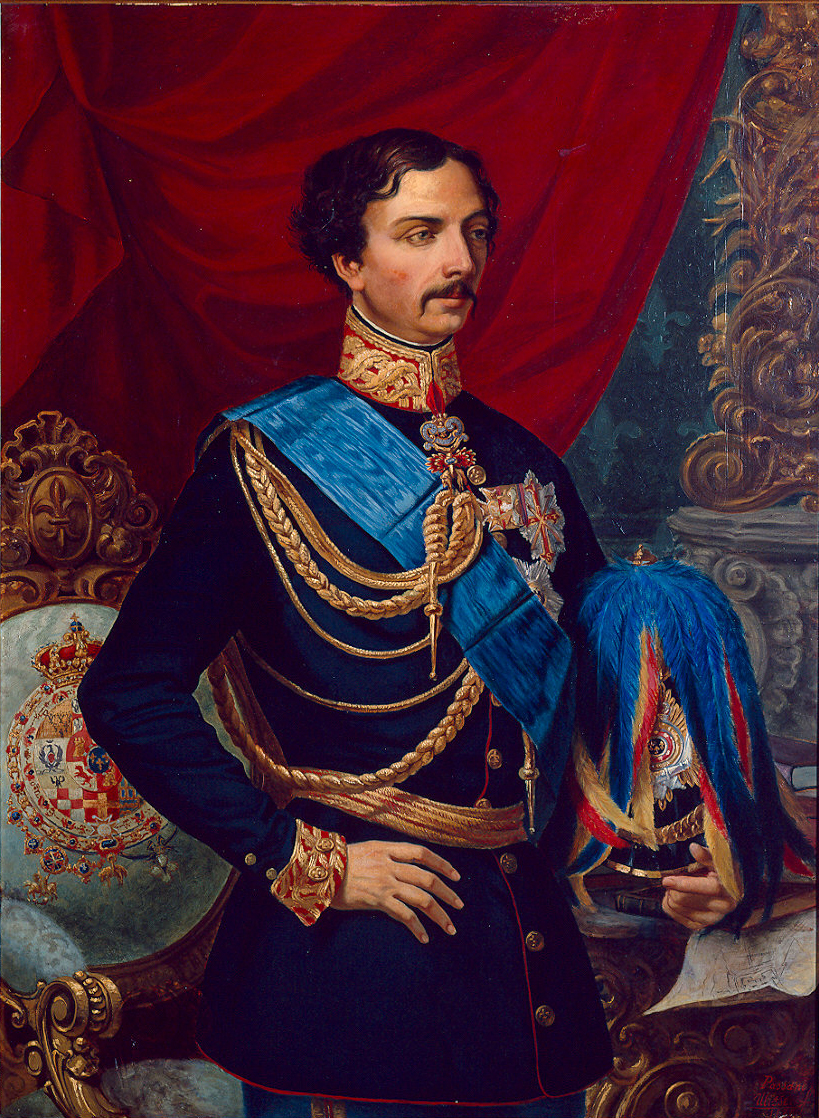
Posthumous portrait by Ulisse Passani

On 24 March 1849, the abdication of Charles II was announced. Ferdinando Carlo, still living in England, succeeded to the title of Duke of Parma, Piacenza, and the Annexed States taking the name Charles III. On 18 May 1849 he re-entered Parma, but left again two days later for Olmutz to secure Austrian support. He did not take over the administration of the duchy until 25 August when he made a solemn entry into Parma as its new Duke.

Although Charles III was an authoritarian ruler, his reign was less reactionary than those of his cousins in Naples and Tuscany. He was very anticlerical and an opponent of capital punishment. No death sentences were carried out during his five-year reign. He loved England, which he visited once more after his ascension to the ducal throne, but he had no sympathies for Austria even though he was closely related to the Habsburgs and owed his throne to the Austrian intervention. Charles III, in spite of his personal charms, was not loved by his subjects. The nobility treated him warily while the bourgeoisie was as contemptuous of him as he was of them. He got on best with the popular classes. He was very fond of the ballet, and he was well liked by dancers, soldiers, peasants and ordinary citizens. Though conscious at all time of his rank—he used his walking stick on anyone who he deemed disrespectful towards him—he was simple in his manners, very approachable and he had great personal charm. However, his arbitrary decisions destroyed the respect that his subjects had for him and his dynasty and he became unpopular. By 1853 there were rumors of plots to remove him from power.

His personal life was also in turmoil. He grew apart from his wife, who became exceedingly fat. The Duchess was a sharp-tongued woman who liked having her way through intrigues and the force of her personality. The rift between husband and wife grew when Charles III openly began an affair with Countess Emma Guadagni (1829–1866), a sister-in-law of the Austrian general governor of Trento. They met in Florence in February 1852, while Charles III was a guest of Leopold II, Grand Duke of Tuscany. In a semi-official visit to Queen Isabella II of Spain in December 1853, Charles III took his mistress with him, bringing about the final breakdown of his marriage. In mid February 1854, Charles III returned to Parma.

== Assassination ==
On Sunday 26 March 1854, around 4:00 p.m, Charles left the Riserva Palace to take a walk on the streets of Parma, as he used to do every afternoon. He was accompanied only by an aide-de-camp, Count Bacinetti. During his walk, he saw his wife, Duchess Louise, who was sitting in a carriage, listening to an open-air concert in a square of Parma. They waved to each other politely. At 5:45 the Duke was returning to his palace; while he was passing by the church of Santa Lucia, he stopped for a moment to ask about the identity of a pretty girl whom he had just seen in an upper window across the street. He was making the inquiry and saluting two soldiers, who walked by him, when he was attacked from behind by two men who were trailing him. One of them knocked the Duke violently and stabbed him deep in the stomach with a triangular blade. Everything happened so fast that Charles initially did not realize what had just transpired and seconds later gasping he said, "My God, I'm done for. They have stabbed me". In the confusion, the two assailants escaped running in opposite directions and mixing with the crowd.

The wounded Duke fell on the ground in a pool of blood with the blade still in his stomach. He was lifted up, and held by his arms and legs. He was carried back to the palace. He made no complaints as his doctors treated his wound, which was deep. He asked if they thought his life was in danger. They lied assuring him that it was not and he passed out. In moments of lucidity, the Duke, realizing the seriousness of his condition repeated: "I am preparing myself for a long journey". The Duke received the last rites and was able to see his wife and their children for a last time. After atrocious suffering, which he endured bravely, he died the following evening, 27 March at 5:30 p.m. He was thirty-one years old.

Charles's body was buried in the Cappella della Macchia near Viareggio. His heart was placed in an urn in the crypt of the Sanctuary of Santa Maria della Steccata in Parma. The Duke's assailants, Ireneo Bochi and Antonio Carra, escaped prosecution. Both were briefly arrested, but as they looked very much alike, witnesses were confounded and their testimonies deemed unreliable. Count Bacinetti, the key witness, was not liked by Duchess Louise, who had him expelled from Parma. Bochi and Carra acted not for political reasons, but for financial gain. It was never clarified who paid them to kill the Duke.

== Notes ==
Charles III of Parma House of Bourbon-Parma Cadet branch of the House of Bourbon Born: 14 January 1823 Died: 27 March 1854
Regnal titles
Preceded by Charles II	Duke of Parma and Piacenza; 1849–1854	Succeeded by Robert I
