= Maria Teresa of Savoy =

Duchess of Parma and Piacenza from 1847 to 1849

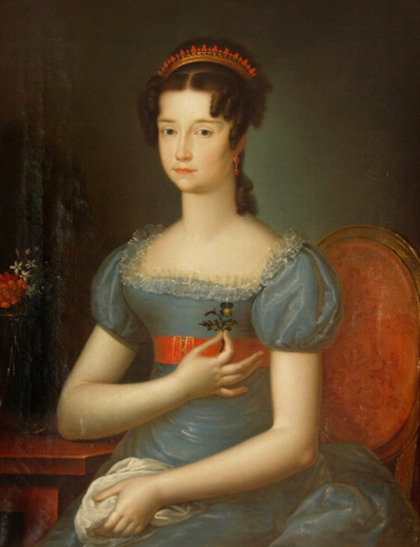
- Portrait, c. 1817

Duchess consort of Parma and Piacenza
- Tenure: 17 December 1847 – 17 May 1849

Duchess consort of Lucca
- Tenure: 13 March 1824 – 17 December 1847
- Born: 19 September 1803; Palazzo Colonna, Rome, Papal States
- Died: 16 July 1879 (aged 75); San Martino, Vignale, Italy
- Burial: Verano Cemetery, Rome
- Spouse: Charles II, Duke of Parma (m. 1820)
- Issue: Princess Luisa; Charles III, Duke of Parma
Names
- Maria Teresa Fernanda Felicitas Gaetana Pia di Savoia
- House: Savoy (by birth); Bourbon-Parma (by marriage)
- Father: Victor Emmanuel I of Sardinia
- Mother: Archduchess Maria Teresa of Austria-Este

Maria Teresa of Savoy (Maria Teresa Fernanda Felicitas Gaetana Pia; 19 September 1803 – 16 July 1879) was Duchess consort of Parma and Piacenza by marriage to Charles II, Duke of Parma (Duke Charles I of Lucca).

== Early life ==
Maria Teresa was born on 19 September 1803 at the Palazzo Colonna in Rome. She was the fifth child and fourth daughter of King Victor Emmanuel I of Sardinia and his wife, Archduchess Maria Teresa of Austria-Este. She had a twin sister, Maria Anna. The two princesses were baptised by Pope Pius VII. Their godparents were their maternal grandparents, Archduke Ferdinand of Austria-Este and his wife Maria Beatrice Ricciarda d'Este. There is a painting of the baptism in the Museo di Roma.

Maria Teresa spent the majority of her childhood in Cagliari on the island of Sardinia, where her family had taken refuge from the armies of Napoleon of France. In 1814 her father was restored to rule in Piedmont and the family returned to Turin. She had hoped to marry her cousin Charles Albert of Savoy, who in 1817 married Archduchess Maria Theresa of Austria, a daughter of the Duke of Tuscany.

== Marriage ==
On 5 September 1820, in Lucca, Maria Teresa married Charles Louis, Prince of Lucca.

They had two children:

- Luisa Francesca di Paola Teresa Maria Anna Clothilde Beatrice (29 October 1821 – 8 September 1823)
- Carlo Giuseppe Maria Vittorio Baldasarre, Duke of Parma (14 January 1823 – 27 March 1854)

Maria Teresa was tall and often considered beautiful and Charles Louis was said to be handsome. However they were mismatched. She was a deeply religious woman committed to her Catholic faith. Charles Louis lived largely for his own pleasure often ignoring his governmental responsibilities. They lived most of their married life apart from each other. "Even if there was no love", Charles Louis later commented, "there was respect".

On 13 March 1824, Charles Louis' mother died, and he succeeded her as Duke Charles I of Lucca; Maria Teresa became Duchess of Lucca. Neglected by her husband who had numerous affairs, she turned increasingly towards religion and grew disdainful of court life and entertainments, to which her husband was attached. He sometimes dragged her in his travels and in 1829 she accompanied him visiting the court of Saxony. Their relationship, cold from the beginning, deteriorated quickly with time.

== Later life ==
Eventually she retired completely from the court of Lucca, settling permanently first in Villa di Marlia and later to her villa at Pianore, where surrounded by priest and nuns, she dedicated her life to religion. After 1840 she lived in complete religious seclusion in Pianore. She was very attached to her own Sardinian family and lived a life dedicated to religion. She surrounded herself by her confessor and her homeopathic doctors. Her husband visited her but he commented that her weak intellect and lack of sensitivity "would enable her to live a century ". She had little influence over their son who, in 1845, married princess Louise Marie Thérèse d'Artois, a daughter of the Duke of Berry and the only sister of the French Legitimist pretender the Count of Chambord.

On 17 December 1847, the Empress Marie Louise died, and, in accordance with the Congress of Vienna, Charles exchanged the duchy of Lucca for that of Parma, becoming Duke Charles II of Parma; Maria Teresa became Duchess of Parma but only for few months. The revolution broke out in March 1848. In March 1849 Charles abdicated as duke of Parma and was succeeded by their son, Charles III.

Maria Teresa lived mostly at her villa at Viareggio, particularly after the assassination of her son in 1854. There she built a chapel as a memorial for her son. Later she lived in a villa in San Martino in Vignale on the hills just north of Lucca served only by her confessor and the administrator of the property. The villa is still called "Tenuta Maria Teresa" in her honor. There she died in 1879 as a result of cerebral arteriosclerosis. She was buried in the Verano cemetery in Rome, dressed in the habit of the Third Order of St. Dominic.

== Bibliography ==
- Mateos Sainz de Medrano. Ricardo. Changing Thrones: Duke Carlo II of Parma. Published in Royalty History Digest, Vol 3, N 1. July 1993.
- Sardi. Cesare. ‘’Maria Teresa di Savoia Duchessa di Lucca e Terziaria Domenicana’’. Published in Letture Domenicane tenute in Lucca negli anni 1921 e 1922, Lucca, La Madonna dei Miracoli. 1927.

Maria Teresa of Savoy House of Savoy Born: 19 September 1803 Died: 16 July 1879
Royal titles
Vacant Title last held by Maria Amalia of Austria	Duchess consort of Parma; 17 December 1847 – 17 May 1849	Vacant Title next held by Louise d'Artois
