= Louis XVIII Receiving the Duke of Angoulême on His Return from the Spanish Campaign =

Painting by Antoine Jean-Baptiste Thomas

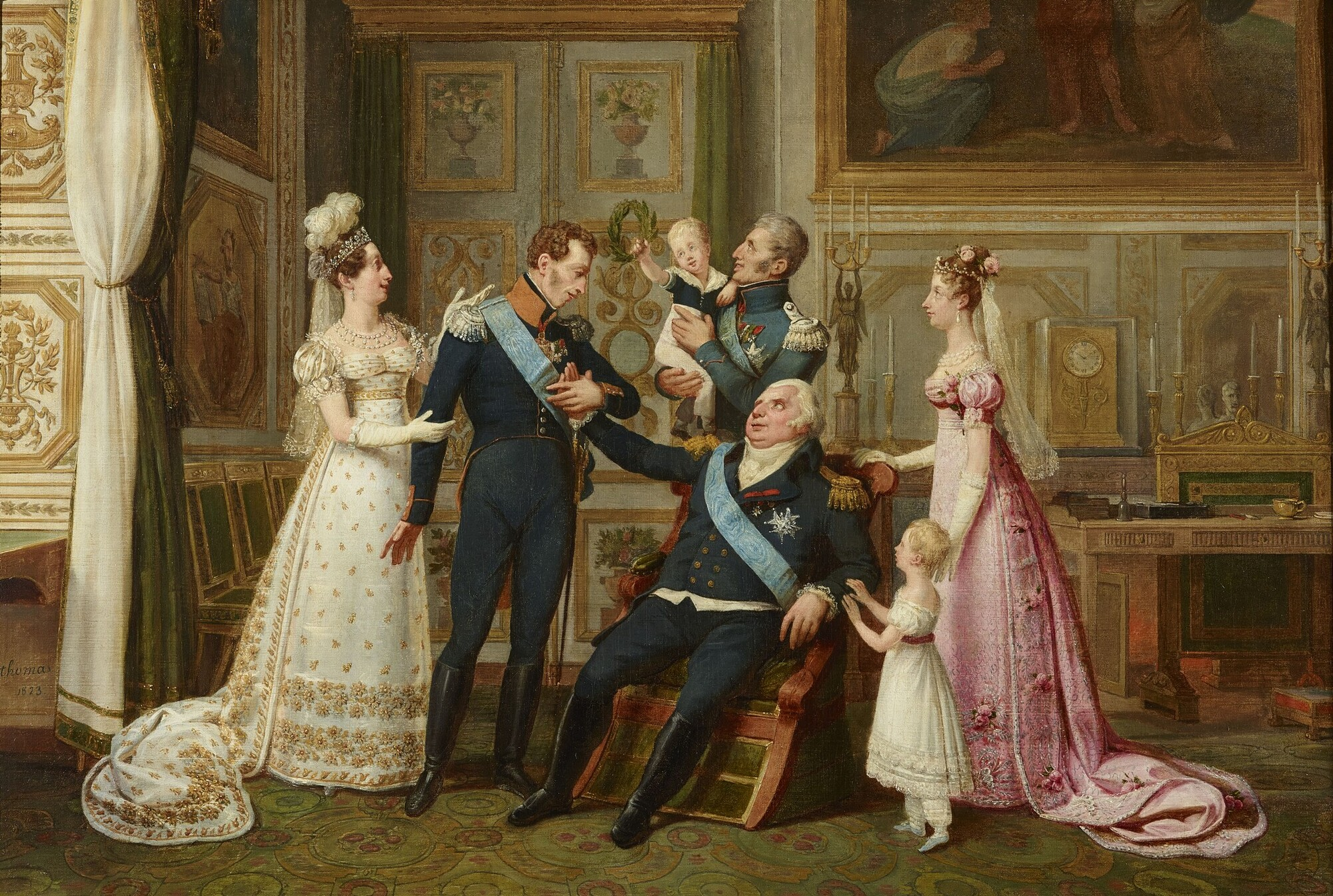
- Artist: Antoine Jean-Baptiste Thomas
- Year: 1823
- Type: Oil on canvas, history painting
- Dimensions: 76.5 cm × 108.5 cm (30.1 in × 42.7 in)
- Location: Palace of Versailles, Versailles

Louis XVIII Receiving the Duke of Angoulême on His Return from the Spanish Campaign is an 1823 history painting by the French artist Antoine Jean-Baptiste Thomas. It features a group portrait of the leading members of the French royal family as Louis XVIII welcomes his nephew Louis Antoine, Duke of Angoulême back from his successful military campaign in Spain in command of the Hundred Thousand Sons of Saint Louis. Showing the Tuileries Palace it features the gout-ridden monarch seated as he congratulates Angoulême. The Duke's wife Marie Thérèse clings to her husband. Behind the King is Angoulême's father the Count of Artois (later Charles X of France) who holds up the young Duke of Bordeaux. On the right is the Duchess of Berry, the widow of Angoulême's younger brother who had been assassinated in 1820, along with her daughter Princess Louise.

Thomas was considered one of the rising stars of the Bourbon era. The painting was commissioned by city authorities of Paris. Today it is in the collection of the Palace of Versailles.

== Bibliography ==
- Alcouffe, Daniel. Un âge d'or des arts décoratifs, 1814-1848. 1991.
- Crow, Thomas. Restoration: The Fall of Napoleon in the Course of European Art, 1812-1820. Princeton University Press, 2023.
