= Procession of Saint Januarius During an Eruption of Vesuvius =

Painting by Antoine Jean-Baptiste Thomas

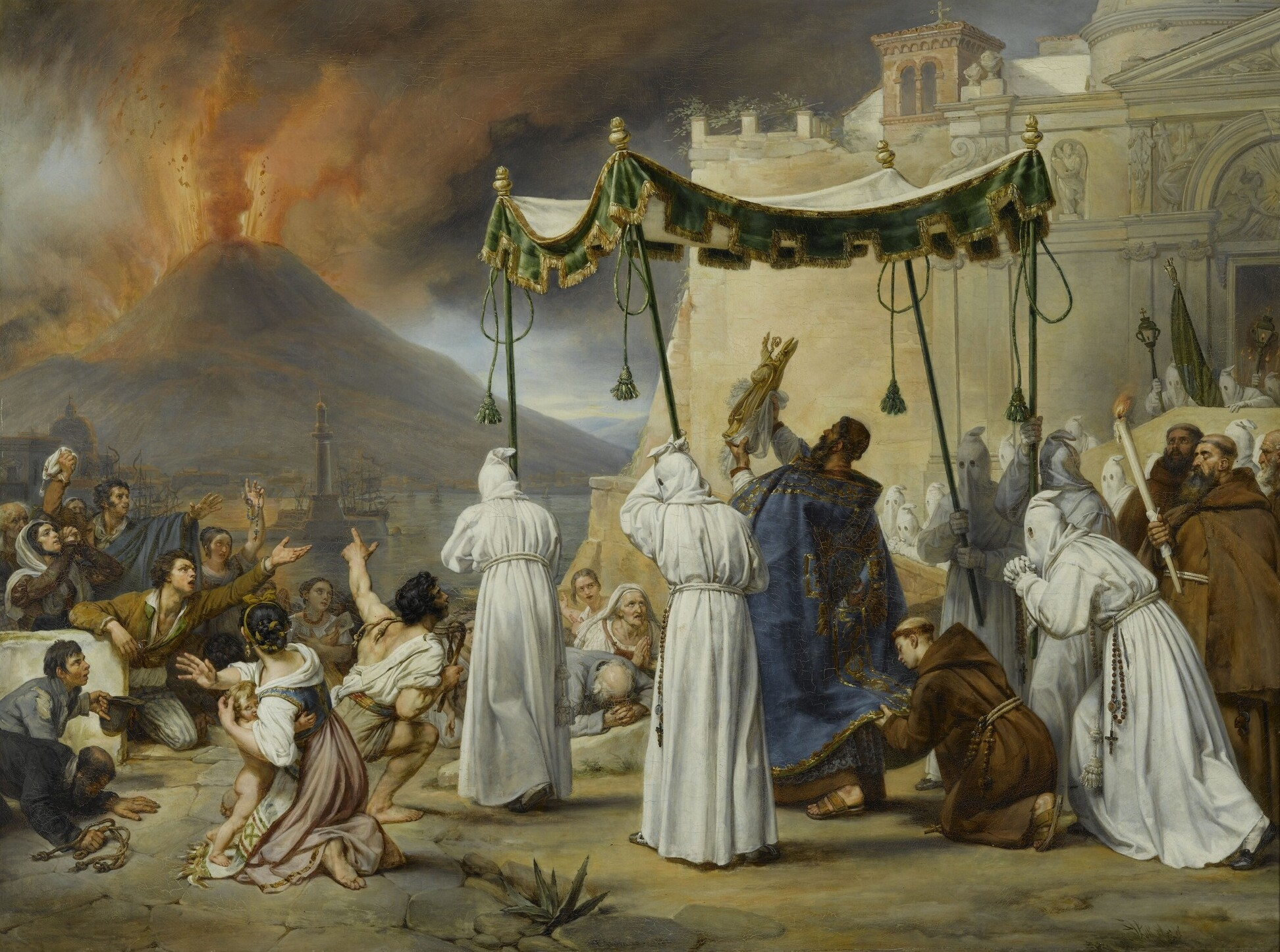
- Artist: Antoine Jean-Baptiste Thomas
- Year: 1822
- Type: Oil on canvas, history painting
- Dimensions: 95 cm × 128 cm (37 in × 50 in)
- Location: Palace of Versailles; Versailles

Procession of Saint Januarius During an Eruption of Vesuvius (French: Procession de saint Janvier à Naples pendant une éruption du Vésuve) is an 1822 oil painting by the French artist Antoine Jean-Baptiste Thomas. It depicts a procession of Saint Januarius, the patron saint of Naples, against the backdrop of the volcano Mount Vesuvius erupting. A major eruption of Vesuvius occurred from October to November 1822. This was reflected in a number of artworks of the era including Horace Vernet's Vesuvius Erupting.

The painting was exhibited at the Salon of 1822 at the Louvre in Paris. Today it is in the collection of the Palace of Versailles.

== Bibliography ==
- Armiero, Marco & Hall, Marcus (ed.) Nature and History in Modern Italy. Ohio University Press, 2010.
- Bonfait, 'Olivier Maestà di Roma: da Napoleone all'unità d'Italia : d'Ingres à Degas : les artistes français à Rome. Electa, 2003.
- Darley, Gillian. Vesuvius: The Most Famous Volcano in the World. Profile Books, 2011.
- Giorgi, Rosa. The History of the Church in Art. Getty Publications, 2008.
