= Antoine Jean-Baptiste Thomas =

French painter and lithographer (1791–1834)

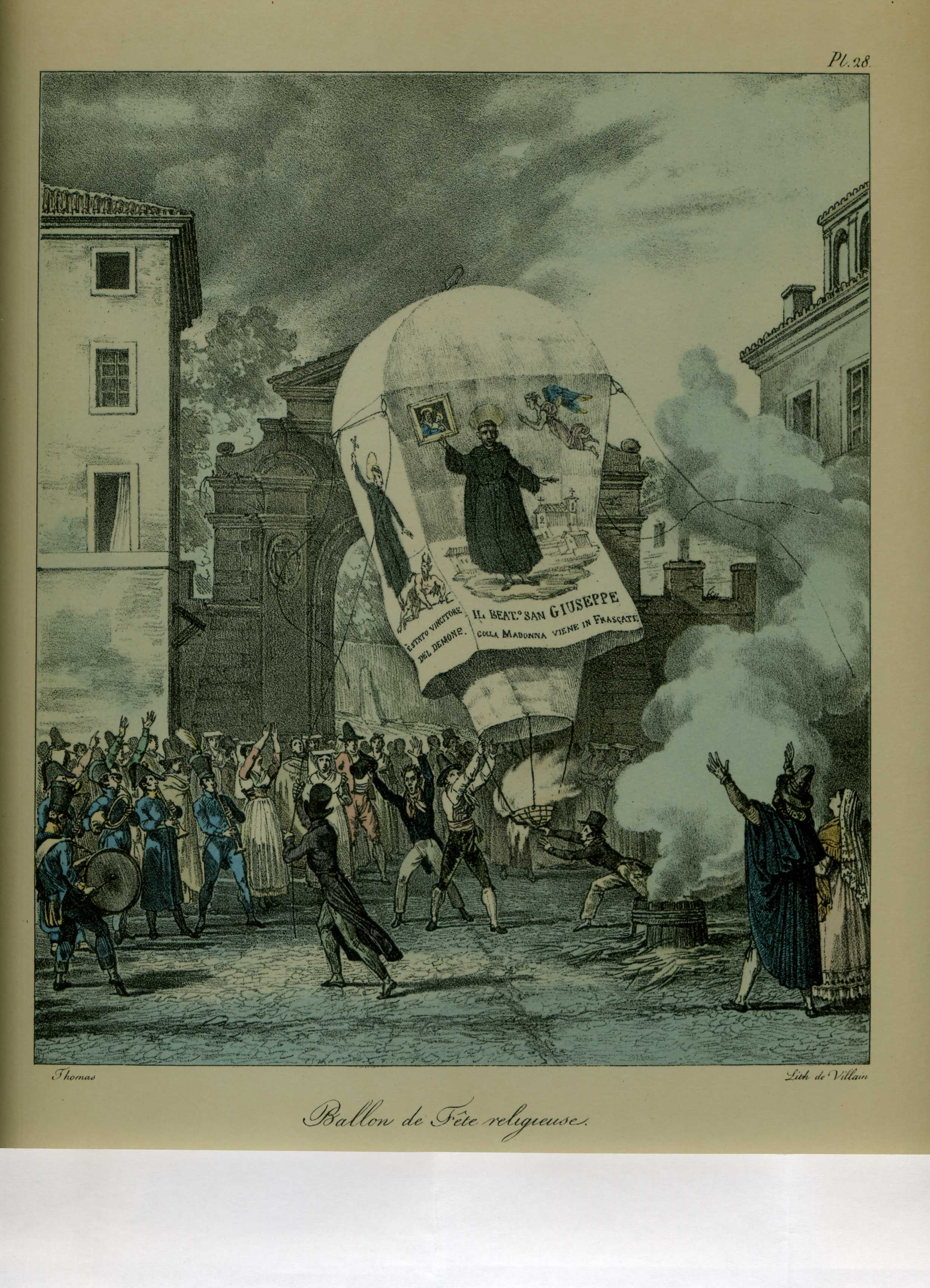
Frascati religious holiday by Antoine Jean-Baptiste Thomas, 1823

Antoine Jean-Baptiste Thomas (1791–1834) was a French painter and lithographer.

Thomas mentored under François-André Vincent, and later studied at the École des Beaux-Arts. Thomas lived and traveled around Italy, which inspired many of his works. He specialized in oil paintings, often depictions of Italian daily life or ancient rome. He was also commissioned to paint a number of religious works for various churches. In 1816 he won the Prix de Rome with his piece Oenone Refusing to Help the Wounded Paris. He spent two years studying art in Rome and returned to Paris in 1818. Between 1819 and 1831 he exhibited his paintings at Salons, however today he is best known for his series of lithographs, One Year in Rome and Its Environs. Thomas' style is characterized as Romanticism.

== Gallery ==
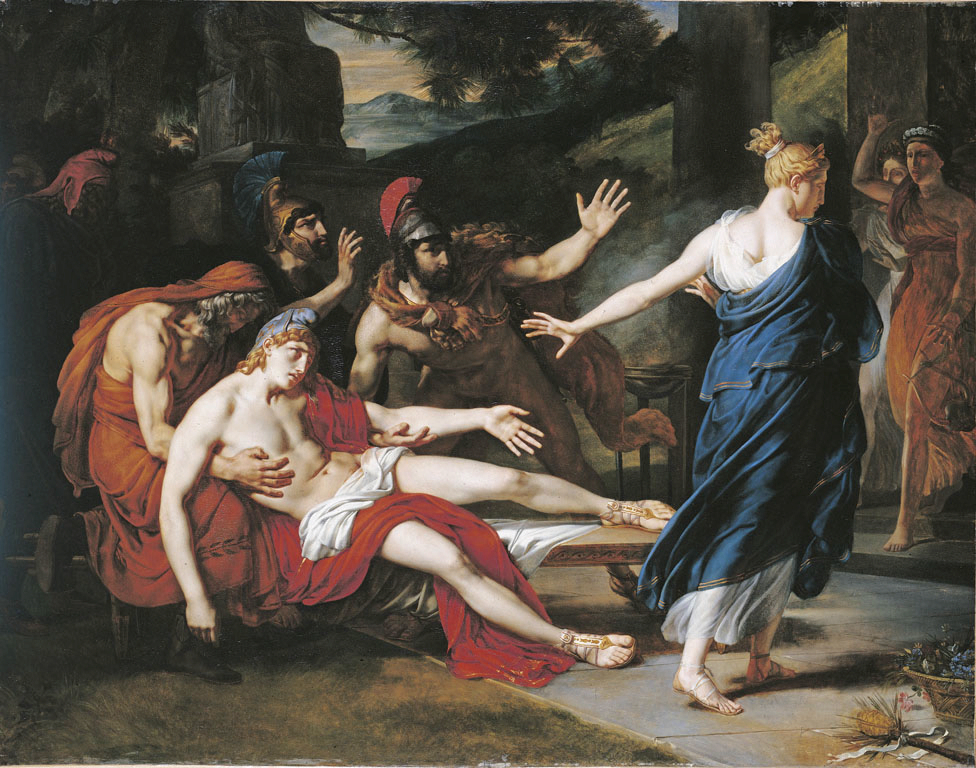
Oenone Refusing to Help the Wounded Paris, Prix de Rome, 1816

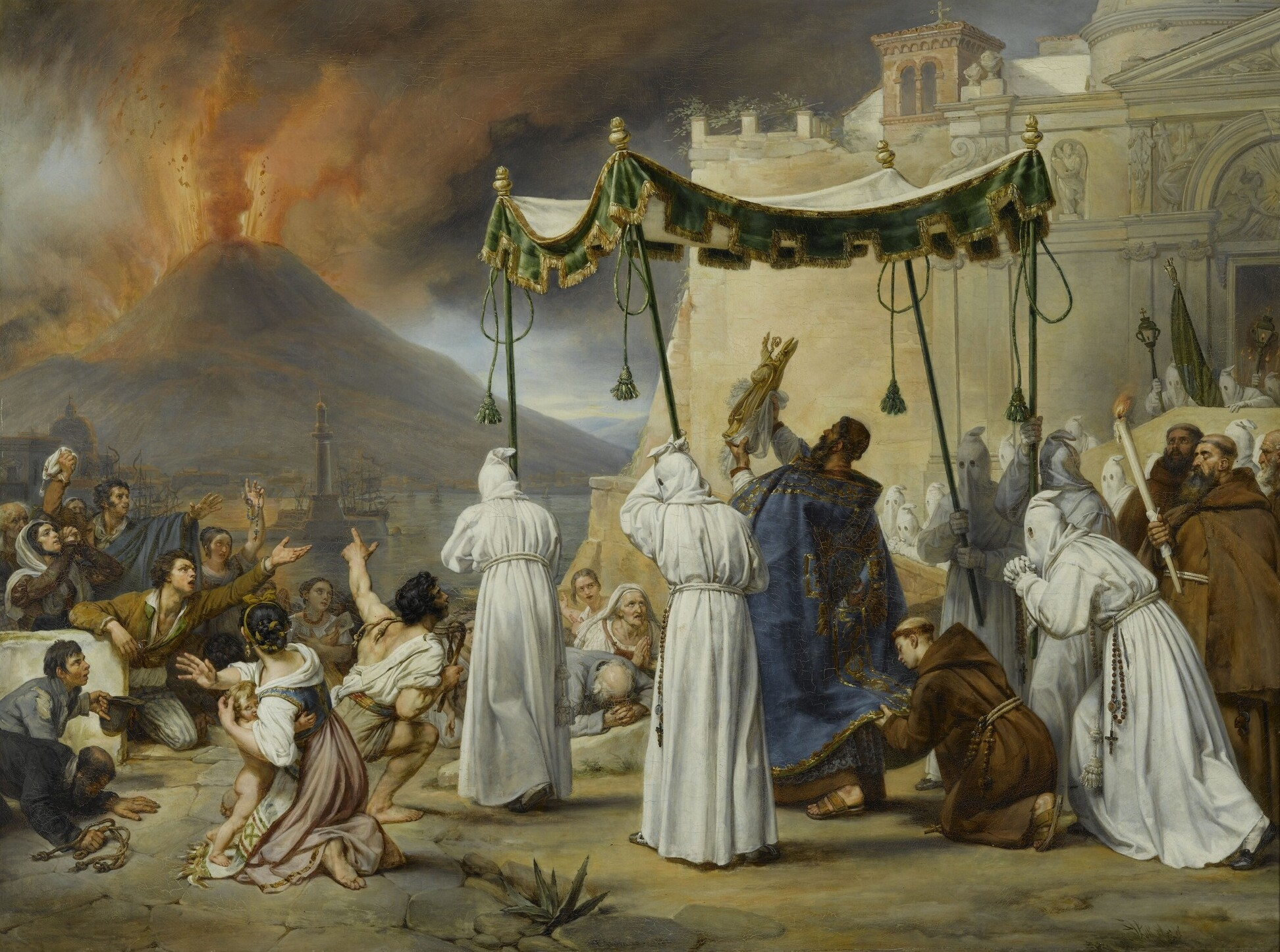
Procession of Saint Januarius During an Eruption of Vesuvius, 1822

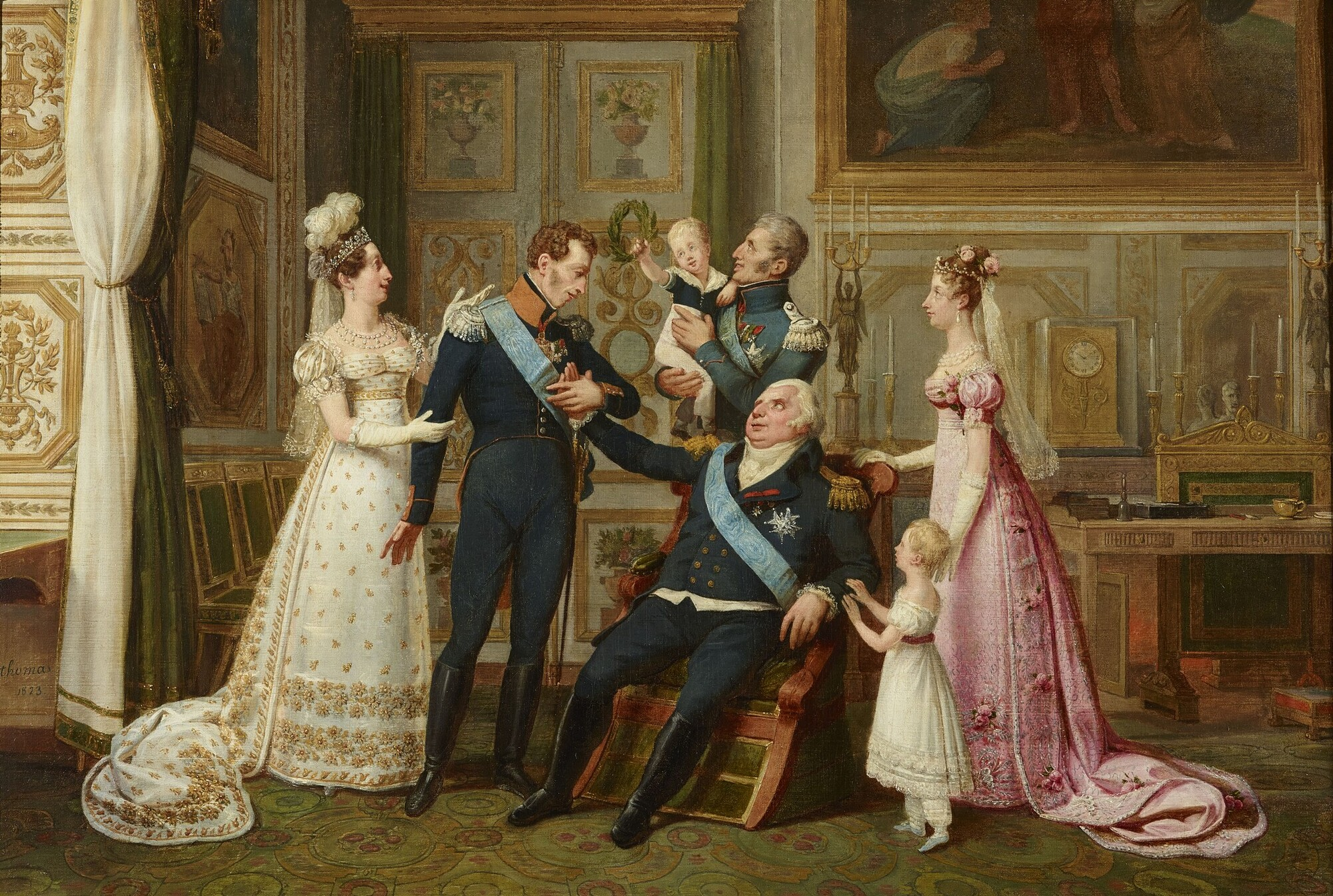
Louis XVIII Receiving the Duke of Angoulême on His Return from the Spanish Campaign 1823
