= Duchy of Lucca =

Historical state in present-day Italy

Duchy of Lucca Ducato di Lucca (Italian)
- 1815–1847
- Flag (1824–1847) Coat of arms

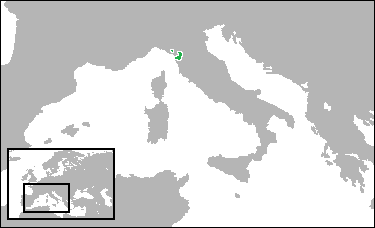
- The Duchy of Lucca (green).

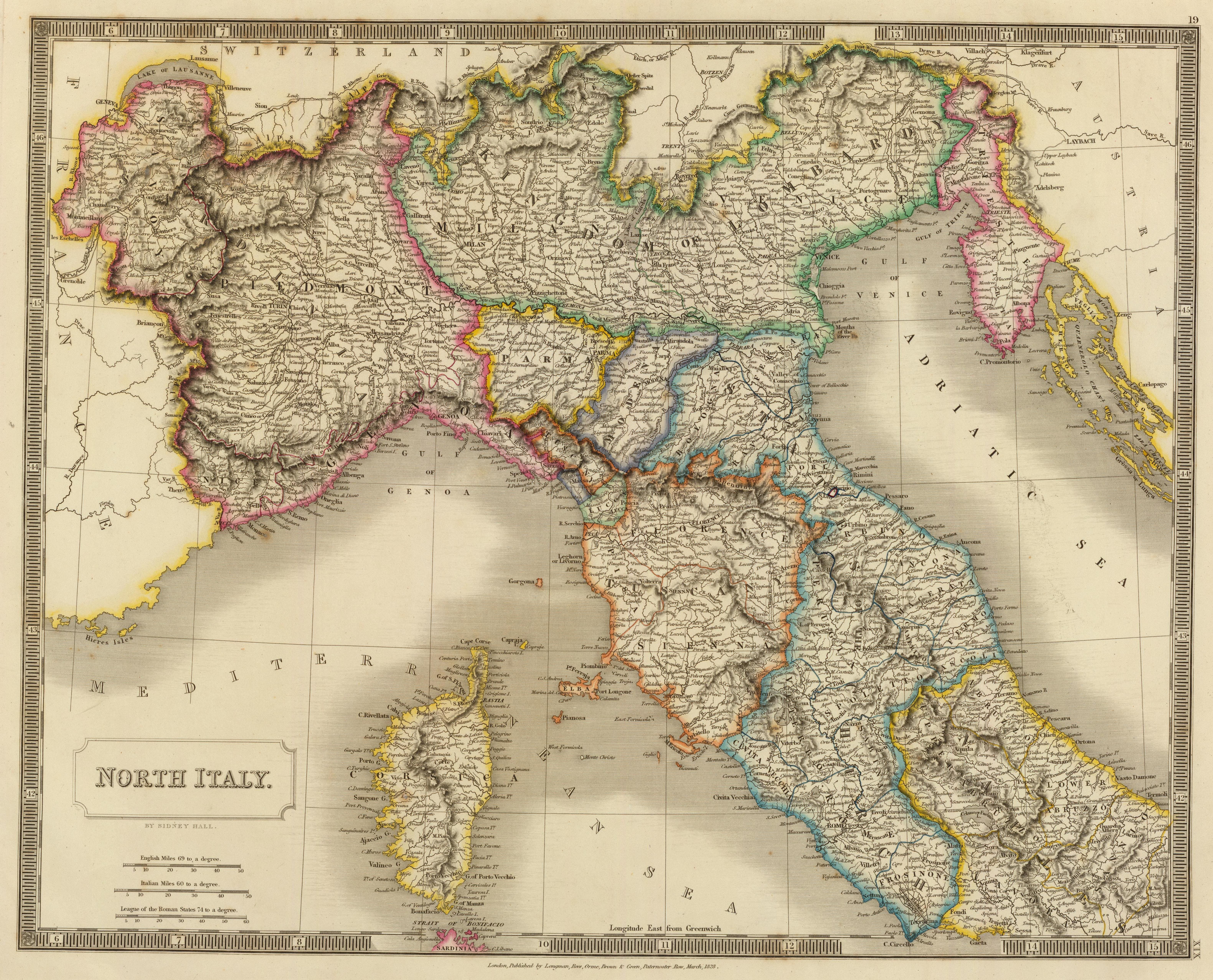
- Imaginative map of Northern Italy in 1828.
- Capital: Lucca
- Common languages: Italian
- Government: Constitutional Monarchy
- Duke
  - 1815–1824: Maria Luisa
  - 1824–1847: Charles I
- History
  - Congress of Vienna: 9 June 1815
  - Reversion to the Grand Duchy of Tuscany: 17 December 1847
- Currency: Luccan lira
Preceded by	Succeeded by
Principality of Lucca and Piombino	Grand Duchy of Tuscany
- Today part of: Italy

The Duchy of Lucca (Italian: Ducato di Lucca) was a small Italian state existing from 1815 to 1847. It was centered on the city of Lucca.

== History ==
The Duchy was formed in 1815 by the Congress of Vienna, out of the former Republic of Lucca and the Principality of Lucca and Piombino, which had been ruled by Elisa Bonaparte. It was created to compensate the House of Bourbon-Parma for the loss of the Duchy of Parma and Piacenza, which was bestowed on the former Empress of the French, Marie Louise of Austria. According to the final act of the Congress of Vienna the duchy was to revert to Tuscany on the end of its Bourbon-Parma line of rulers or when the line would obtain another territory; no stipulation was provided regarding the final fate of the Duchy of Parma upon the death of its new ruler.

The Infanta Maria Luisa of Spain, erstwhile Queen Consort (then Regent) of Etruria, widowed daughter-in-law of the last Duke of Parma, Ferdinand I, and thus a sort of matriarch of the House of Bourbon-Parma, drastically rejected the stipulations of the Congress and induced her brother King Ferdinand VII of Spain to refuse them as well. She retreated into her family's Roman residence and would not take possession of her new duchy by any means.

In 1817 the great powers finally found an accommodation: Ferdinand VII agreed to sign the Final Act and a new accessory treaty was stipulated by which the Infanta, her son Charles Louis and his male descendants were recognized as having the right of reversion over the Duchy of Parma on Marie Louise's death; whereupon the reversion of the Duchy of Lucca to Tuscany was also to take place. For its part, Austria undertook to pay, starting from June 1815, the huge compensatory annuity of 500,000 francs already provided for by the Final Act.

This time the Infanta accepted and, on 22 November 1817, the Spanish ambassador to the Kingdom of Sardinia, Eusebio Bardají Azara, took possession of the duchy in her name, and she made her triumphal entry into Lucca with her son on 7 December following.

When she died in 1824, Charles Louis assumed the government of the duchy under the name of Charles I.

In October 1847, not feeling up to facing the turmoil that was a prelude to the revolutions of 1848, Charles concluded a treaty with Leopold II, Grand Duke of Tuscany, with which he renounced the dukedom in advance, thus leading to its reversion before becoming Duke of Parma; which however happened within two months due to the sudden death of Marie Louise of Austria.

In taking possession of his new state, on 11 October 1847 Leopold II promulgated an unexpected law which abolished the death penalty there, thus making the former Duchy of Lucca the only European territory in which this measure was then legally in force. However, this situation did not last long as, with a ruling in February 1848, the Court of Cassation of Florence promptly extended the effectiveness of the measure to the entire grand ducal territory. Three years earlier, in 1845, Charles I had denied pardon to five thieves sentenced to death, having them executed in one fell swoop on the lawn in front of the gate of Lucca called Porta San Donato.

From 1815 to 1818, the flag of Lucca was yellow and red horizontal stripes. From 7 November 1818, to 1847 the flag was white, with Maria Luisa's coat of arms and the yellow–red flag in the canton.

== Dukes of Lucca (1815–1847) ==
Name	Lifespan	Reign start	Reign end	Notes	Family	Image
Maria Luisa	6 July 1782 – 13 March 1824 (aged 41)	9 June 1815	13 March 1824	Only accepted the investiture in 1817; granted the rank and privileges of a queen	Bourbon-Spain	Maria Luisa, Duchess of Lucca
Charles Louis	22 December 1799 – 16 April 1883 (aged 83)	13 March 1824	5 October 1847 (Abdication)	Son of Maria Luisa	Bourbon-Parma	Charles Louis

== Symbols ==
Duchy of Lucca (1815-1818)

Duchy of Lucca (1818-1824)

Duchy of Lucca (1824–1847)

Merchant Flag (1819)

Merchant Flag (1820)

Coat of Arms (1815-1824)

Middle Coat of Arms (1824-1847)
