= Duke of Parma =

Ruler of the Duchy of Parma (1545–1802, 1814–1859)

Duke of Parma and Piacenza
- Coat of arms of the House of Bourbon-Parma as Dukes of Parma and Piacenza. (1848–1859)
- Robert I

Details
- Style: Royal Highness
- First monarch: Pier Luigi Farnese
- Last monarch: Robert I
- Formed: 16 September 1545; 481 years ago
- Abolished: December 3, 1859; 166 years ago
- Pretender: Carlos, Duke of Parma

The Duke of Parma and Piacenza (Italian: duca di Parma e Piacenza) was the ruler of the Duchy of Parma and Piacenza, a historical state of Northern Italy. It was created by Pope Paul III (Alessandro Farnese) for his son Pier Luigi Farnese. It existed between 1545 and 1802, and again from 1814 to 1859.

The Duke of Parma was also Duke of Piacenza, except for the first years of the rule of Ottavio Farnese (1549–1556), and the time of the Napoleonic Wars, when the two were established as separate positions held by two different individuals. The Duke of Parma also usually held the title of Duke of Guastalla from 1746 (when Francis I, Holy Roman Emperor occupied the Duchy of Guastalla after the last Gonzaga duke died childless) until 1847 (when the territory was ceded to Modena), except for the Napoleonic era, when Napoleon's sister Pauline was briefly Duchess of Guastalla and of Varella. The last duke, Robert I, was driven from power in a revolution following France and Sardinia's victory over Austria. Its territory was merged into Sardinia in 1860.

The position is currently claimed by a member of the House of Bourbon-Parma. A recent pretender to the extinct Parmese throne, the late Carlos-Hugo, was also a pretender to the Spanish throne in the 1970s (see Carlism).

== Reigning Dukes of Parma and Piacenza (1545–1802) ==
=== House of Farnese 1545–1731 ===
| Duke | Portrait | Birth | Marriages | Death |
|---|---|---|---|---|
| Pier Luigi; 16 September 1545 – 10 September 1547 | | 19 November 1503; Rome son of Cardinal Alexander Farnese (future Pope Paul III) and probably Silvia Ruffini | Girolama Orsini; 1519; Rome; 4 children | 10 September 1547; Piacenza aged 43 |
| Ottavio; 9 November 1549 – 18 September 1586 | | 9 October 1524; Valentano son of Pier Luigi Farnese, Duke of Parma and Girolama Orsini | Margaret of Parma; 4 November 1538; Rome; 2 children | 18 September 1586; Parma aged 61 |
| Alessandro; 18 September 1586 – 3 December 1592 | | 27 August 1545; Rome son of Ottavio Farnese, Duke of Parma and Margaret of Parma | Maria of Portugal; 11 November 1565; Brussels; 3 children | 3 December 1592; Saint Waast, Netherlands aged 47 |
| Ranuccio I 3 December 1592 – 5 March 1622 | | 28 March 1569; Parma son of Alexander Farnese, Duke of Parma and Maria of Portugal | Margherita Aldobrandini; 7 May 1600; Rome; 9 children | 5 March 1622; Parma aged 52 |
| Odoardo; 5 March 1622 – 11 September 1646 | | 28 April 1612; Parma son of Ranuccio I Farnese, Duke of Parma and Margherita Aldobrandini | Margherita de Medici; 11 October 1628; Florence; 4 children | 11 September 1646; Piacenza aged 34 |
| Ranuccio II; 11 September 1646 – 11 December 1694 | | 17 September 1630; Casalmaggiore son of Odoardo Farnese, Duke of Parma and Margherita de Medici | (1) Marguerite of Savoy; 29 April 1660; Turin; 2 children (2) Isabella of Modena; 18 February 1664; Modena; 3 children (3) Maria of Modena; 1 October 1668; Modena; 9 children | 11 December 1694; Parma aged 64 |
| Francesco; 11 December 1694 – 26 February 1727 | | 19 May 1678; Parma son of Ranuccio II Farnese, Duke of Parma and Maria of Modena | Dorothea Sophie of Neuburg; 7 December 1696; Parma no issue | 26 February 1727; Piacenza aged 48 |
| Antonio; 26 February 1727 – 20 January 1731 | | 29 November 1679; Parma son of Ranuccio II Farnese, Duke of Parma and Maria of Modena | Enrichetta d'Este; 5 February 1728; Parma no issue | 20 January 1731; Parma aged 51 |

=== House of Bourbon 1731–1735 ===
| Duke | Portrait | Birth | Marriages | Death |
|---|---|---|---|---|
| Charles I 26 February 1731 – 3 October 1735 | Charles | 20 January 1716; Madrid son of Philip V of Spain and Elizabeth of Parma | Maria Amalia of Saxony; 19 June 1738; 13 children | 14 December 1788; Madrid aged 72 |

=== House of Habsburg 1735–1748 ===
| Duke | Portrait | Birth | Marriages | Death |
|---|---|---|---|---|
| Emperor Charles VI; 3 October 1735 – 20 October 1740 | | 1 October 1685; Vienna son of Leopold I, Holy Roman Emperor and Eleonore-Magdalena of Neuburg | Elisabeth Christine of Brunswick-Wolfenbüttel; 1 August 1708; Barcelona; 4 children | 20 October 1740; Vienna aged 55 |
| Maria Theresa; 20 October 1740 – 18 October 1748 | | 13 May 1717; Vienna daughter of Charles VI, Holy Roman Emperor and Elisabeth Christine of Brunswick-Wolfenbüttel | Francis I, Holy Roman Emperor; 12 February 1736; 16 children | 29 November 1780; Vienna aged 63 |

=== House of Bourbon-Parma 1748–1802 ===
| Duke | Portrait | Birth | Marriages | Death |
|---|---|---|---|---|
| Philip; 18 October 1748 – 18 July 1765 | | 15 March 1720; Madrid son of Philip V of Spain and Elisabeth Farnese | Princess Louise Élisabeth of France; 25 October 1739; 3 children | 18 July 1765; Alessandria aged 45 |
| Ferdinand; 18 July 1765 – 9 October 1802 | | 20 January 1751; Parma son of Philip, Duke of Parma and Princess Louise Élisabeth of France | Archduchess Maria Amalia of Austria; 19 July 1769; 7 children | 9 October 1802; Fontevivo aged 51 |

== French Dukes of Parma (1808–1814) ==
These did not actually rule over any territory of Parma and Piacenza, but were of the honorary, hereditary type duché grand-fief, granted by Napoleon I in 1808. The title of Duc de Parme became extinct in 1824 upon the death of the 1st Duke, the title of Duc de Plaisance became extinct in 1926 upon the death of the 6th Duke.

| Duke | Portrait | Birth | Marriages | Death |
|---|---|---|---|---|
| Jean-Jacques-Régis de Cambacérès; 1808–1814 | | 18 October 1753; Montpellier son of Jean-Antoine de Cambacérès and Marie-Rose Vassal | never married | 8 March 1824; Paris aged 70 |
| Charles-François Lebrun, duc de Plaisance; 1808–1814 | | 19 March 1739; Saint-Sauveur-Lendelin fourth son of Paul Lebrun and Louise Le Cronier | Anne Delagoutte 1773 3 sons and 2 daughters | 16 June 1824; Sainte-Mesme aged 85 |

== Reigning Dukes of Parma (1814–1859) ==
=== House of Habsburg-Lorraine, 1814–1847 ===
| Duke | Portrait | Birth | Marriages | Death |
|---|---|---|---|---|
| Marie Louise; 11 April 1814 – 17 December 1847 | | 12 December 1791; Vienna daughter of Francis II, Holy Roman Emperor and Maria Theresa of Naples and Sicily | (1) Napoleon I 1 April 1810; Louvre; 1 son (2) Adam Albert, Count von Neipperg; 7 September 1821; Parma; 3 children (3) Charles René, Count of Bombelles; Parma; 17 February 1834 no issue | 17 December 1847; Parma aged 56 |

- Napoléon François Joseph Charles Bonaparte, the son of Marie Louise and Napoleon I, was at one time in the line of succession, but he was never Duke of Parma. He predeceased his mother in 1832.

=== House of Bourbon-Parma, 1847–1859 ===
| Duke | Portrait | Birth | Marriages | Death |
|---|---|---|---|---|
| Charles II; 17 December 1847 – 17 May 1849 | | 22 December 1799; Madrid son of Louis of Etruria and Maria Louisa, Duchess of Lucca | Maria Teresa of Savoy; 5 September 1820; 2 children | 16 April 1883; Nice aged 83 |
| Charles III; 17 May 1849 – 27 March 1854 | | 14 January 1823; Pianore son of Charles II, Duke of Parma and Maria Teresa of Savoy | Louise Marie Thérèse of France; 10 November 1845; 4 children | 27 March 1854; Parma aged 31 |
| Robert I 27 March 1854 – 9 June 1859 | | 9 July 1848; Florence son of Charles III, Duke of Parma and Louise Marie Thérèse of France | (1) Maria Pia of the Two Sicilies; 5 April 1869; 12 children (2) Maria Antonia of Portugal; 15 October 1884; 12 children | 16 November 1907; Viareggio aged 59 |

== Titular Dukes of Parma (1859–present) ==
| Duke | Portrait | Birth | Marriages | Death |
|---|---|---|---|---|
| Robert I 1859–1907 | | 9 July 1848; Florence son of Charles III, Duke of Parma and Louise Marie Thérèse of Artois | Maria Pia of the Two Sicilies; 5 April 1869; 12 children Maria Antonia of Portugal; 15 October 1884; 12 children | 16 November 1907; Viareggio aged 59 |
| Henry; 1907–1939' | | 13 June 1873; Wartegg son of Robert I, Duke of Parma and Maria Pia of the Two Sicilies | never married | 16 November 1939; Pianore aged 66 |
| Joseph; 1939–1950 | | 30 June 1875; Biarritz son of Robert I, Duke of Parma and Maria Pia of the Two Sicilies | never married | 7 January 1950; Pianore aged 75 |
| Elias; 1950–1959 | | 23 July 1880; Biarritz son of Robert I, Duke of Parma and Maria Pia of the Two Sicilies | Maria Anna of Austria; 25 May 1903; Vienna; 8 children | 27 June 1959; Friedberg aged 79 |
| Robert II; 1959–1974 | | 7 August 1909; Weilburg son of Elias, Duke of Parma and Maria Anna of Austria | never married | 25 November 1974; Vienna aged 65 |
| Xavier; 1974–1977 | | 25 May 1889; Viareggio son of Robert I, Duke of Parma and Maria Antonia of Portugal | Madeleine de Bourbon-Busset; 12 November 1927; Lignières; 6 children | 7 May 1977; Zizers aged 87 |
| Carlos Hugo; 1977–2010 | | 8 April 1930; Paris son of Xavier, Duke of Parma and Madeleine de Bourbon-Busset | Princess Irene of the Netherlands; 29 April 1964; Rome; 4 children | 18 August 2010; Barcelona aged 80 |
| Carlos since 2010 | | 27 January 1970; Nijmegen son of Carlos Hugo, Duke of Parma and Princess Irene of the Netherlands | Annemarie Gualthérie van Weezel; 20 November 2010; Brussels; 3 children | incumbent |

== See also ==
- Timeline of Parma
