= Elias, Duke of Parma =

Head of the House of Bourbon-Parma from 1950 to 1959

Elias I
- Duke of Parma
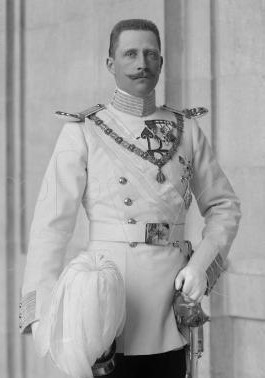
- Prince Elias in c. 1914

Head of the House of Bourbon-Parma
- Tenure: 7 January 1950 – 27 June 1959
- Predecessor: Duke Joseph
- Successor: Duke Robert Hugo
- Born: 23 July 1880; Biarritz
- Died: 27 June 1959 (aged 78); Friedberg
- Burial: Prinz Bourbon-Parma Gruftkapelle, Neue Glasshütte, near Mönichkirchen, Austria
- Spouse: Archduchess Maria Anna of Austria (m. 1903; died 1940)
- Issue: Princess Elisabetta; Prince Carlo; Princess Maria Francesca; Robert Hugo, Duke of Parma; Prince Francesco; Princess Giovanna Isabella; Infanta Alicia, Duchess of Calabria; Princess Maria Cristina
Names
- Elias Robert Charles Maria
- House: Bourbon-Parma
- Father: Robert I, Duke of Parma
- Mother: Princess Maria Pia of Bourbon-Two Sicilies
- Religion: Roman Catholicism

Elias I, Duke of Parma and Piacenza (Italian: Elia di Borbone-Parma; 23 July 1880 – 27 June 1959) was the head of the House of Bourbon-Parma and pretender to the defunct throne of Parma between 1950 and 1959. From 1907 to 1950, he served as regent for the claims of his two older disabled brothers.

== Early life ==
Elias was born at Biarritz, the youngest son of the deposed Duke Robert I of Parma and his first wife Princess Maria Pia of Bourbon-Two Sicilies (daughter of King Ferdinand II of the Two Sicilies).

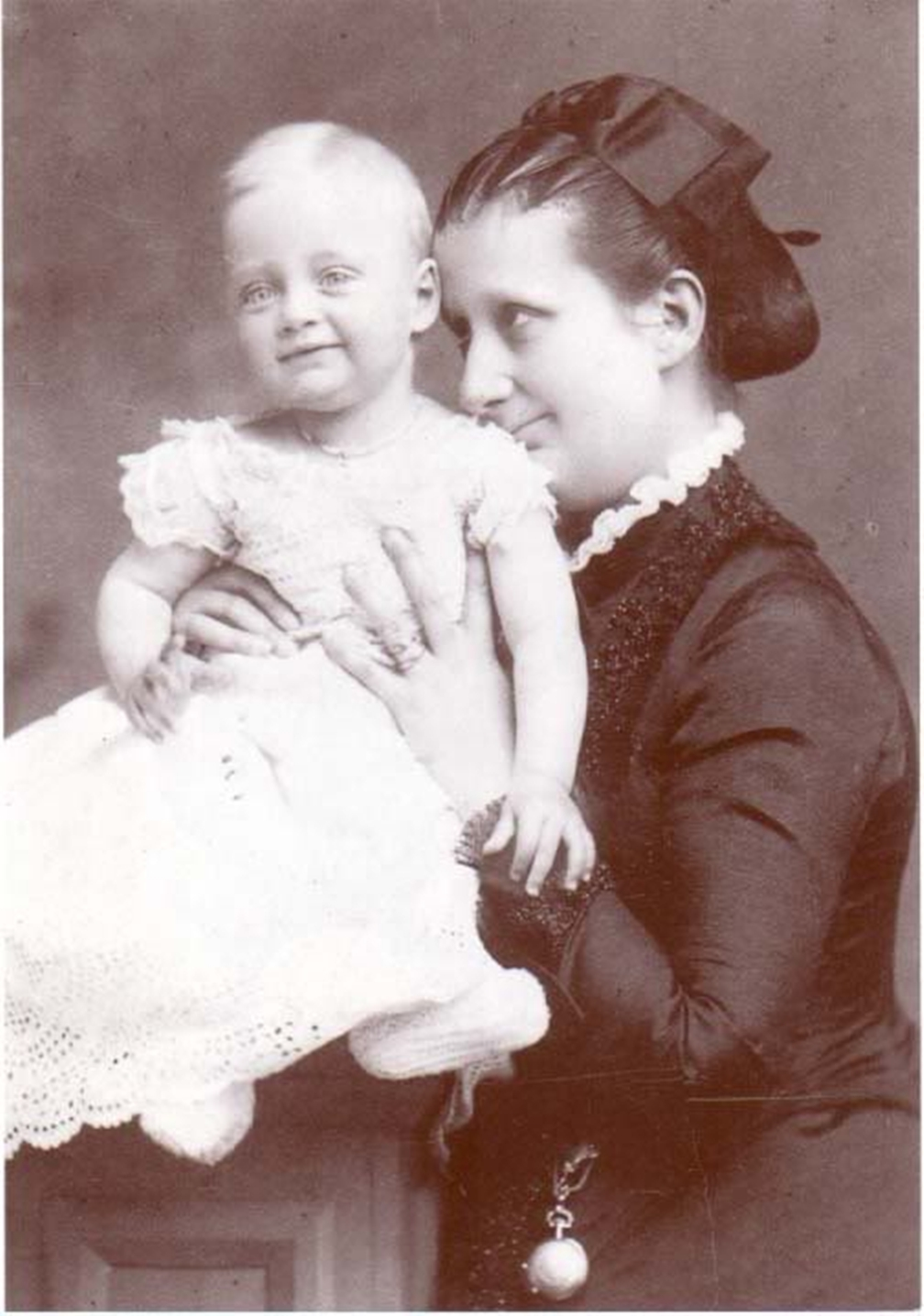
Elias with his mother, Maria Pia

Despite the loss of the throne, his father Robert enjoyed considerable wealth. They owned castles at Schwarzau am Steinfeld near Vienna in Austria, Villa Pianore, between Pietrasanta and Viareggio in Italy, and the magnificent Château de Chambord in France (up until its confiscation in World War I).

== Marriage and family ==
On 25 May 1903 at Vienna, Elias married Archduchess Maria Anna of Austria (1882–1940), daughter of Archduke Friedrich, Duke of Teschen, and a niece of Queen Maria Cristina of Spain. They had eight children, though only one of them married and had issue:

- Princess Elisabetta of Bourbon-Parma (17 March 1904 – 13 June 1983); she died unmarried.
- Prince Carlo Luigi of Bourbon-Parma (22 September 1905 – 26 September 1912); he died of poliomyelitis.
- Princess Maria Francesca of Bourbon-Parma (5 September 1906 – 20 February 1994); she died unmarried.
- Robert Hugo, Duke of Parma (7 August 1909 – 15 November 1974); he died unmarried.
- Prince Francesco Alfonso of Bourbon-Parma (14 June 1913 – 29 May 1939); he died unmarried.
- Princess Giovanna Isabella of Bourbon-Parma (8 July 1916 – 1 November 1949); she never married and was killed in a shooting accident in La Toledana, Spain.
- Princess Alicia of Bourbon-Parma (13 November 1917 – 28 March 2017); she married Infante Alfonso, Duke of Calabria, on 16 April 1936. They had three children.
- Princess Maria Christina of Bourbon-Parma (7 June 1925 – 1 September 2009); she died unmarried.

Through his fourth daughter, Princess Alicia, he is the great-grandfather of Prince Pedro, Duke of Calabria, one of two claimants to the throne of the Two Sicilies.

== Regent for his brothers ==
In 1907 Elias' father Robert died and was succeeded in his ducal claims of Parma by his son Enrico who was mentally disabled. Less than four months later the Grand Marshal of the Austrian court declared Enrico and five of his siblings legally incompetent. Elias became regent for Enrico's claims and guardian for his disabled siblings.

In 1907 Elias was made a knight of the Order of the Golden Fleece by the Emperor Franz Joseph of Austria.

In 1910 Elias came to an agreement with his half-siblings, his father's children by his second wife, about the division of their father's estate. Elias was to have half of the estate in order to support his rank as head of the family; this half included the château de Chambord.

In 1915 Chambord was sequestered by the French government as alien property, since Elias held a commission in the Austro-Hungarian Army. Liquidation proceedings were started in 1919 in application of the Treaty of Saint-Germain-en-Laye, which gave the Allies the right to keep such property. Elias' half-brothers, Sixtus and Xavier took Elias to court to obtain a greater share of their father's estate. They claimed that the 1910 family agreement violated the French law which mandated equal division between siblings. In 1925 the French courts determined that Sixtus and Xavier should have a larger share, but in 1928 this judgement was overturned on appeal. In 1932 the court of cassation upheld the appeal on the grounds that there was a valid agreement between the siblings to an unequal division. Elias' rights to the château de Chambord were thereby recognised - but the wartime confiscation was upheld and Elias was financially compensated with 11 million francs.

In 1939 Enrico died and was succeeded in his ducal claims of Parma by his brother Giuseppe who also was mentally disabled. Elias continued to act as regent.

In 1950 Giuseppe died and Elias succeeded as pretender of Parma.

Elias died at Friedberg, Styria in 1959. He and his wife are buried in the nearby village of Mönichkirchen.

== Ancestry ==
Ancestors of Elias, Duke of Parma

8. Charles II, Duke of Parma
4. Charles III, Duke of Parma
9. Princess Maria Teresa of Savoy
2. Robert I, Duke of Parma
10. Prince Charles Ferdinand, Duke of Berry
5. Princess Louise of Artois
11. Princess Marie Caroline of Naples and Sicily
1. Elias, Duke of Parma
12. Francis I of the Two Sicilies
6. Ferdinand II of the Two Sicilies
13. Infanta Maria Isabella of Spain
3. Princess Maria Pia of Bourbon-Two Sicilies
14. Archduke Charles, Duke of Teschen
7. Archduchess Maria Theresa of Austria
15. Princess Henrietta of Nassau-Weilburg

== Notes ==
Elias, Duke of Parma House of Bourbon-Parma Cadet branch of the House of Bourbon Born: 23 July 1880 Died: 27 June 1959
Titles in pretence
Preceded by Joseph	— TITULAR — Duke of Parma; 1950–1959; Reason for succession failure: Annexed by Kingdom of Italy	Succeeded by Robert Hugo
