= Robert Hugo, Duke of Parma =

Head of the House of Bourbon-Parma from 1959 to 1974

Robert Hugo
- Duke of Parma

Head of the House of Bourbon-Parma
- Tenure: 27 June 1959 – 15 November 1974
- Predecessor: Duke Elias
- Successor: Duke Xavier
- Born: 7 August 1909; Weilburg Palace, Baden bei Wien, Austria
- Died: 25 November 1974 (aged 65); Vienna, Austria
- Burial: Prinz Bourbon-Parma Gruftkapelle, Neue Glasshütte, near Mönichkirchen, Austria
Names
- Robert Hugo Rainier Alexis Louis Henry Deodatus Elias Pius Maria
- House: House of Bourbon-Parma
- Father: Elias, Duke of Parma
- Mother: Archduchess Maria Anna of Austria
- Religion: Roman Catholicism

Robert Hugo, Duke of Parma and Piacenza (Italian: Roberto Ugo di Borbone-Parma; 7 August 1909 – 15 November 1974) was the head of the House of Bourbon-Parma and the pretender to the defunct throne of the Duchy of Parma as Robert II, Duke of Parma between 1959 and 1974.

== Life ==
Robert Hugo was born at the Weilburg Palace in Baden bei Wien, the second but eldest surviving son of Elias, Duke of Parma and Archduchess Maria Anna of Austria (1882–1940). He succeeded his father Elias as head of the House of Bourbon-Parma upon his death in 1959, and maintained his style until his death in 1974 in Vienna. He died unmarried and without issue, and was succeeded by his agnatic half-uncle Xavier.

== Honours ==
- (Kingdom of the Two Sicilies) Calabrian House of Bourbon-Two Sicilies Knight Grand Cross of Justice of the Calabrian Two Sicilian Order of Saint George.

== Ancestry ==
Ancestors of Robert Hugo, Duke of Parma

8. Charles III, Duke of Parma
4. Robert I, Duke of Parma
9. Princess Louise of Artois
2. Elias, Duke of Parma
10. Ferdinand II of the Two Sicilies
5. Princess Maria Pia of Bourbon-Two Sicilies
11. Archduchess Maria Theresa of Austria
1. Robert Hugo, Duke of Parma
12. Archduke Karl Ferdinand of Austria
6. Archduke Friedrich, Duke of Teschen
13. Archduchess Elisabeth Franziska of Austria
3. Archduchess Maria Anna of Austria
14. Rudolf, 11th Duke of Croÿ
7. Princess Isabella of Croÿ
15. Princess Natalie of Ligne

== See also ==
- Duchy of Parma
- House of Bourbon-Parma

Robert Hugo, Duke of Parma House of Bourbon-Parma Cadet branch of the House of Bourbon Born: 1909 Died: 1974
Titles in pretence
| Preceded by Elias I | — TITULAR — Duke of Parma; 1959–1974; Reason for succession failure: Annexed by Kingdom of Italy | Succeeded by Xavier |
