= Princess Margarita de Bourbon de Parme =

Princess Margarita
- Countess of Colorno
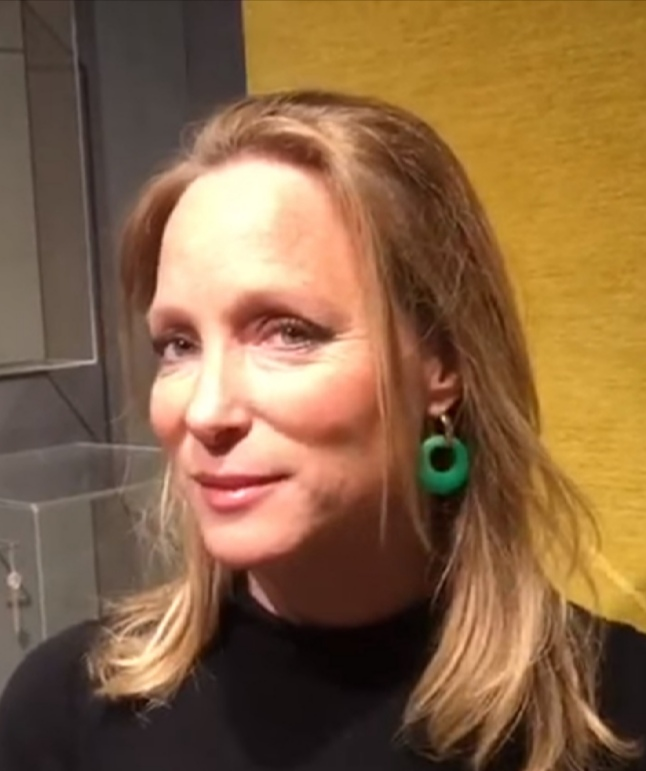
- Princess Margarita in 2016
- Born: 13 October 1972 (age 53); Nijmegen, Netherlands
- Spouse: Edwin de Roy van Zuydewijn (m. 2001; div. 2006) Tjalling ten Cate (m. 2008; sep. 2023)
- Issue: Julia ten Cate; Paola ten Cate
Names
- Dutch: Margarita Maria Beatriz de Bourbon de Parme; English: Margarita Marie Beatrix of Bourbon-Parma
- House: Bourbon-Parma
- Father: Carlos Hugo, Duke of Parma
- Mother: Princess Irene of the Netherlands

Princess Margarita of Bourbon-Parma, Countess of Colorno (Dutch: Margarita Maria Beatrix Prinses de Bourbon de Parme; born 13 October 1972), is the eldest daughter of Princess Irene of the Netherlands and Carlos Hugo, Duke of Parma. She is a member of the House of Bourbon-Parma as well an extended member of the Dutch royal family. Per a 1996 royal decree issued by Queen Beatrix, she is entitled to the style and title Her Royal Highness Princess Margarita de Bourbon de Parme in the Netherlands as a member of the extended royal family.

== Early life ==
Born in Nijmegen, she is the twin sister of Prince Jaime. She also has an elder brother, Prince Carlos, and a younger sister, Princess Carolina. Her godparents are Queen Beatrix of the Netherlands (maternal aunt) and Prince Sixtus Henry of Bourbon-Parma (paternal uncle). She is the eldest granddaughter of Queen Juliana and Prince Bernhard.

In 1981, her parents divorced. Together with her mother and her siblings she moved from Spain to The Netherlands, to live with her grandparents, Queen Juliana of the Netherlands and Prince Bernhard of Lippe-Biesterfeld at Baarn. Later she moved to Wijk bij Duurstede. Margarita studied Cultural Anthropology at the Vrije Universiteit of Amsterdam and is an interior decorator. She studied interior architecture in The Hague.

== First marriage and controversy ==
On 19 June 2001, Princess Margarita married the entrepreneur Edwin Karel Willem de Roy van Zuydewijn (born 19 June 1966), member of a Dutch patrician family. The civil marriage of the couple took place in Amsterdam, and the Roman Catholic marriage was held in Auch Cathedral (France), presided by Ronald Philippe Bär, the former Bishop of Rotterdam, on 22 September 2001. De Roy van Zuydewijn was, however, not trusted by the Dutch Royal Family, whose senior members therefore did not attend the marriage.

In 2003, a series of incidents became known as the Margarita-affair. Margarita and her husband accused the Dutch Royal House and the Dutch secret service of obstructing the affairs of Fincentives, the company of de Roy van Zuydewijn. They also said that their telephone conversations had been secretly tapped. Eventually it was revealed that the Queen's personal Cabinet had indeed ordered an investigation; the right to do so had been legally removed from the Queen.

The couple's home was the Bartas Castle in Saint-Georges, Gers, France, but by 2004 the princess was increasingly seen more often in Amsterdam than there. On 13 August 2004, it was revealed that she was filing for a divorce; the official divorce was signed on 8 November 2006. The marriage did not produce any children.

Because of the quarrels between the princess and the Dutch Royal family during the Margarita-affair, she was not welcome at the marriage of her cousin Willem-Alexander, Prince of Orange to Máxima Zorreguieta, or at the funeral of her uncle, Prince Claus of the Netherlands. However, after her divorce from De Roy van Zuydewijn, her relationship with the royal family improved.

== Second marriage and family ==
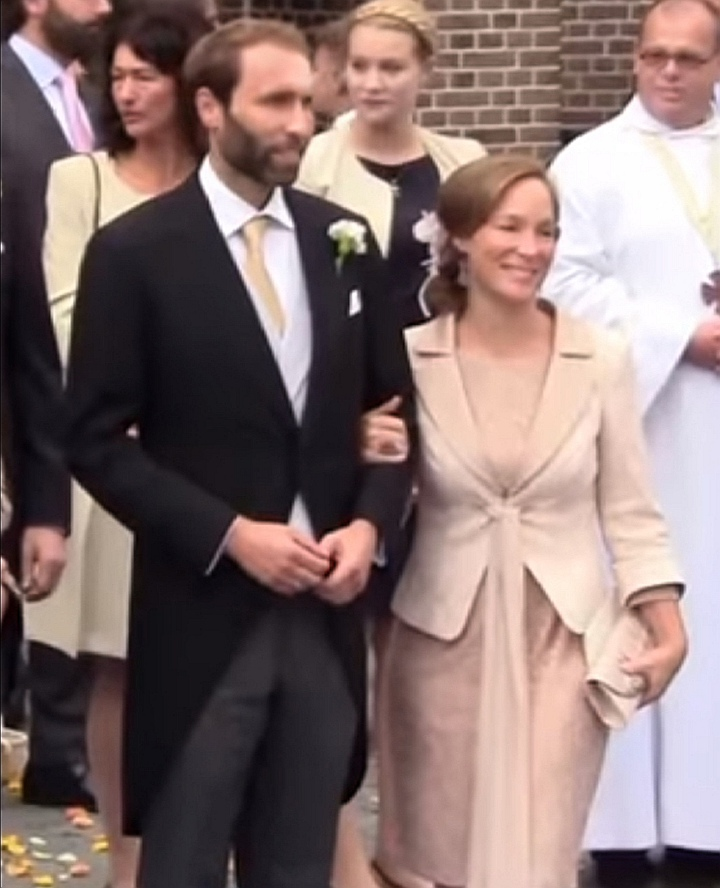
Princess Margarita with her second husband at the wedding of her brother Jaime, Count of Bardi

On 3 May 2008, she married Tjalling Siebe ten Cate (born 23 December 1975, in Dordrecht), a lawyer at De Nederlandsche Bank (the Dutch National Bank), also a member of a Dutch patrician family. On 20 February 2023, Princess Margarita and Ten Cate announced their divorce. Together they have two daughters:

- Julia Carolina Catharina ten Cate (born 3 September 2008 in Amsterdam)
- Paola Cecilia Laurentien ten Cate (born 25 February 2011 in The Hague) Her godmother is Princess Laurentien of the Netherlands.

Margarita currently lives in Wassenaar.

== Titles, styles and honours ==
Already a ducal princess from birth, her father bestowed on 2 September 1996 the substantive title Contessa di Colorno (Countess of Colorno) upon her. The same year she was incorporated into the Dutch nobility by her aunt Queen Beatrix, with the highest noble title Prinses de Bourbon de Parme (Princess of Bourbon-Parma) and styled Hare Koninklijke Hoogheid (Her Royal Highness). She does not belong to the House of Orange-Nassau or the limited Dutch royal house, but as a granddaughter of Queen Juliana, she is officially a member of the more extended Dutch royal family.

Honours

- (Duchy of Parma) Ducal Family of Parma: Knight of the Parmese Sacred Military Constantinian Order of Saint George
- (Duchy of Parma) Ducal Family of Parma: Knight Grand Cross of the Order of Saint Louis for Civil Merit
- Netherlands: Recipient of the King Willem-Alexander Investiture Medal

== Design career ==
Princess Margarita has worked as a designer in jewelry, interior and product design. Her design work has included collaborations with Dutch design companies and the development of her own jewelry brand called: De Parme Design.

=== Interior and product design ===
Margarita collaborated with the Dutch company ICE International on carpet design. Their first documented collaboration took place in 2012 and resulted in the Silhouette rug, a hand-knotted design using wool and silk and incorporating an abstracted representation of beech branches. In 2019, Margarita and ICE International collaborated again on the Gradient Lily rug. The hand-tufted rug featured a graphic interpretation of a lily and used a transition between New Zealand wool and silk. The design was presented during Milan Design Week as part of the Dutch pavilion Masterly – The Dutch in Milano.

=== De Parme Design ===
In 2014 Margarita established her jewelry designs under the name De Parme Design. She collaborated with Antwerp jeweler Röell Jewellery and used a beech-leaf motif in her designs. De Parme Design's jewellery designs draw inspiration from natural forms including leaves and branches. In a 2024 interview with HelloMonaco, she discussed her approach to jewelry design and the influence of trees, leaves and other natural forms on her work.

De Parme Design has presented its jewelry at design and art events. In 2024, the brand was among the designers and jewelry brands featured at the Art & Luxury Fair in Monte Carlo, held at the Hôtel Métropole Monte-Carlo. In 2025, Margarita presented De Parme Design jewelry at the second Monegasque edition of the Art & Luxury Fair. The Leaves collection was displayed by Monegasque jeweler Isabelle Fissore.. De Parme Design has also been represented at the PAN Amsterdam art fair.

=== Isis Fashion Awards ===
In 2025, De Parme Design participated in the Isis Fashion Awards, a fashion competition held in the Netherlands. De Parme Design, represented by Princess Margarita de Bourbon de Parme, was identified by the event by the jury panel as the first-place winner, with MerryMarian and Patience & Ambition placing second and third respectively.
