= Princess Beatrice of Bourbon-Parma (1879–1946) =

Countess of Lucchesi-Palli (1879–1946)

Princess Beatrice
- Countess of Lucchesi-Palli; Princess of Campo Franco
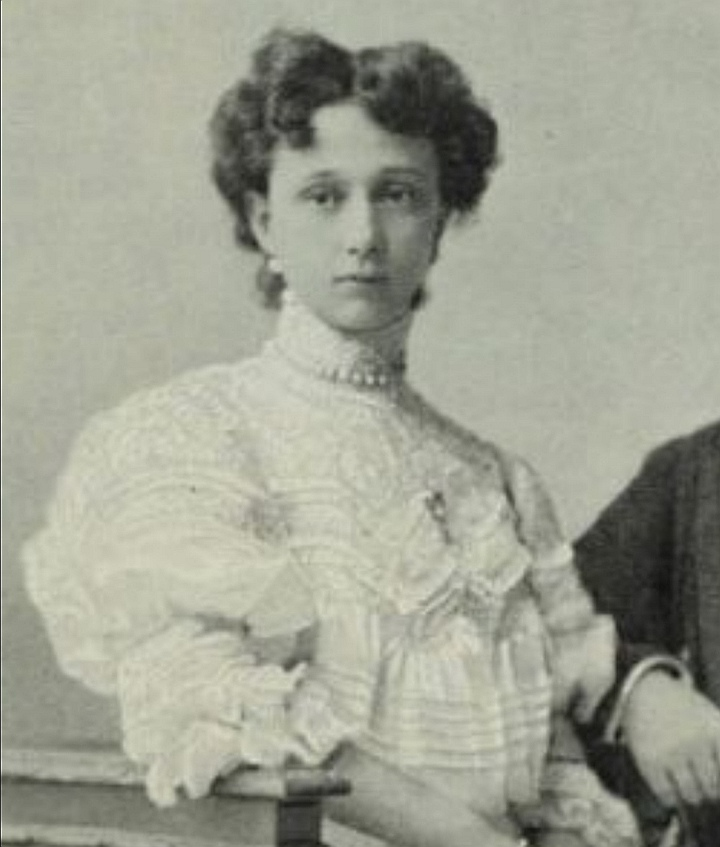
- Born: 9 January 1879; Biarritz, France
- Died: 11 March 1946 (aged 67); Mureck, Styria, Austria
- Burial: Mureck, Austria
- Spouse: Pietro Lucchesi-Palli, Count of Lucchesi-Palli (m. 1906; died 1939)
- Issue: Count Antonio; Count Roberto; Count Adinolfo; Count Ludovico
Names
- French: Béatrice Colombe Marie Immaculée Léonie Italian: Beatrice Colomba Maria Immacolata Leonia
- House: House of Bourbon-Parma
- Father: Robert I, Duke of Parma
- Mother: Princess Maria Pia of the Two Sicilies
- Religion: Roman Catholic

Princess Beatrice of Bourbon-Parma (9 January 1879 – 11 March 1946) was a member of the House of Bourbon-Parma. She was the daughter of Robert I, Duke of Parma and his first wife, Princess Maria Pia of the Two Sicilies.

== Early life ==
Princess Beatrice was born in Biarritz, France, during her family's period of exile following the Unification of Italy. She was the tenth child of her parents. Following the death of her mother in 1882 and her father's remarriage to Infanta Maria Antónia of Portugal, she was raised alongside a total of 23 siblings and half-siblings, including the future Empress Zita of Austria.

== Marriage and later life ==
On 12 August 1906, at Schloss Schwarzau, Beatrice married Pietro Lucchesi-Palli (1870–1939), Count of Lucchesi-Palli and Prince of Campo Franco. Her husband was a grandson of Princess Caroline, Duchess of Berry. Through this marriage, Beatrice became part of the prominent Lucchesi-Palli family.

The couple resided primarily in Austria, where they managed family estates. Beatrice survived the collapse of the Austro-Hungarian Empire and remained in the country through the interwar years. She died in Mureck, Styria, on 11 March 1946, shortly after the end of World War II.

== Ancestry ==
Ancestors of Princess Beatrice of Bourbon-Parma (1879–1946)

8. Charles II, Duke of Parma
4. Charles III, Duke of Parma
9. Princess Maria Teresa of Savoy
2. Robert I, Duke of Parma
10. Charles Ferdinand, Duke of Berry
5. Louise Marie Thérèse of France
11. Princess Marie-Caroline of Bourbon-Two Sicilies
1. Princess Beatrice of Bourbon-Parma
12. Francis I of the Two Sicilies
6. Ferdinand II of the Two Sicilies
13. Maria Isabella of Spain
3. Princess Maria Pia of the Two Sicilies
14. Archduke Charles, Duke of Teschen
7. Archduchess Maria Theresa of Austria
15. Princess Henrietta of Nassau-Weilburg

== Bibliography ==
- Beéche, Arturo E. (2012). The Borbons of Parma: History of a Royal House. Eurohistory. ISBN 978-0985460303.
- McNaughton, Arnold (1973). The Book of Kings: A Royal Genealogy. Garnstone Press. ISBN 978-0900391194.
- Willis, Daniel (1999). The Descendants of Louis XIII. Clearfield. ISBN 978-0806349428.
