= Jaime de Bourbon de Parme =

Dutch diplomat and royal

Prince Jaime of Bourbon-Parma
- Count of Bardi
- Jaime in 2026
- Born: 13 October 1972 (age 54); Nijmegen, Netherlands
- Spouse: Viktória Cservenyák (m. 2013)
- Issue: Princess Zita; Princess Gloria
- House: Bourbon-Parma
- Father: Carlos Hugo, Duke of Parma
- Mother: Princess Irene of the Netherlands

Prince Jaime Bernardo of Bourbon-Parma, Count of Bardi (born 13 October 1972) is a Dutch diplomat and the second son and third child of Princess Irene of the Netherlands and Carlos Hugo, Duke of Parma. He is a member of the House of Bourbon-Parma as well a member of the extended Dutch royal family. From 2014 to 2018, he served as the Dutch ambassador to the Holy See. He was the senior advisor on private sector partnerships at the United Nations High Commissioner for Refugees until 2021. He then served as the Climate Envoy of the Netherlands for over four years. In 2026 he became Director of the Environment at OECD.

== Early life ==
Jaime was born in Nijmegen, Netherlands. He has a twin sister, Princess Margarita, who was born one minute earlier. Besides his twin sister, the prince has one elder brother, Carlos, Duke of Parma, and one younger sister, Princess Carolina. Prince Jaime was born six weeks prematurely and stayed with his sister in an incubator at the hospital. Jaime was baptised by Bernardus Johannes Cardinal Alfrink, with his grandfather Prince Bernhard of Lippe-Biesterfeld and his grandmother Princess Madeleine of Bourbon-Parma as his godparents.

In 1981 his parents decided to divorce. Together with his mother and his siblings he moved to the Soestdijk Palace (Baarn), then residence of his grandparents, Queen Juliana and Prince Bernhard, where he lived for several years.

== Education and career ==
Jaime studied international relations at Brown University in the United States. He subsequently obtained a M.A. degree in International Economics and Conflict Management at Johns Hopkins University. During this studies he performed an internship at the World Wide Fund for Nature and the International Federation of the Red Cross.

He now works for the Ministry of Foreign Affairs of the Netherlands. His first role was as the first secretary of the Netherlands Embassy in Baghdad, before becoming a political advisor to the peace mission in Pol-e Khomri in the Baghlan Province in the northern part of Afghanistan. Until the summer of 2007 the prince worked on secondment in the cabinet of the European Commissioner Neelie Kroes. He was back in The Hague at the Ministry of Foreign Affairs, where he had the position of Special Envoy for Natural Resources. On 7 February 2014, the Ministry of Foreign Affairs announced that he would be appointed as ambassador of the Kingdom of the Netherlands to the Holy See. Prince Jaime was, on 15 July 2014, sworn in as ambassador by King Willem-Alexander and he served till August 2018. Thereafter he was seconded to UNHCR, the United Nations Agency for Refugees, as Senior Advisor Private Sector Partnerships to work on the energy transition in refugee settlements. In August 2021 he started as the Climate Envoy of the Netherlands and served for over four years. Since January 2026 he is the Environment Director at the OECD in Paris.

== Other activities ==
Jaime has also worked as an interviewer for the documentary series Africa, War is Business. In the documentary he investigated and explained how a country that is very rich in raw materials can be dominated by poverty and conflict. In the series he visited Sierra Leone and its diamond fields, Liberia to see how an export embargo on its hardwood is carried out, and the DR Congo, where he goes on a night patrol in the war-torn east of the country, an area rich in gold and cobalt. In the documentary possible solutions are displayed from the perspective of the international community.

The prince performs representative tasks for the Ducal House of Bourbon-Parma. He is regularly present at royal marriages, baptismal ceremonies, and funerals.

== Personal life ==
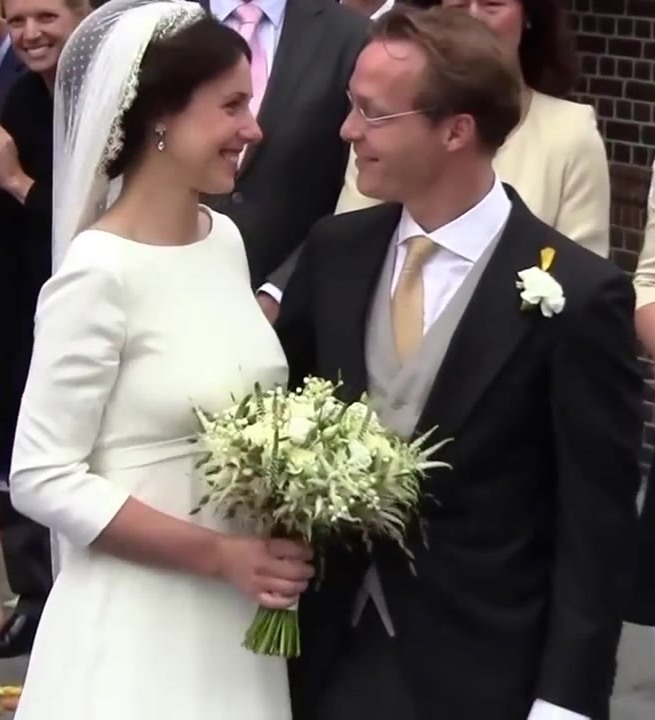
Prince Jaime and Viktória on their wedding day.

On 12 August 2013, Jaime's engagement to Viktória Cservenyák was announced. Cservenyák (born 25 May 1982 in Budapest) is a Hungarian-born Dutch attorney and daughter of Tibor Cservenyák and his former wife, Dorottya Klára Bartos. On 3 October 2013, they married in a civil wedding ceremony in Wijk bij Duurstede. Their religious wedding took place on 5 October 2013, at the Church of Our Lady in Apeldoorn.

They have two daughters: Zita Clara (born on 21 February 2014), who was named after her paternal great-great aunt Empress Zita of Austria and her maternal great-grandmother Klára Killermann. On 9 November 2015, it was announced that the couple were expecting a second child; daughter Gloria Irene was born on 9 May 2016. In a 2015 interview, Princess Viktória stated that the gender of her future child did not matter ("fortunately, we can not influence nature in the terms of gender"), after being told that there were no grandsons for the late Duke of Parma (in April 2016, Jaime's elder brother Carlos, Duke of Parma finally had a son, named Carlos Enrique).

== Notes ==
Already a ducal prince from birth, his father bestowed the substantive title Conte di Bardi ('Count of Bardi') upon him on 2 September 1996. In 1996 he was incorporated into the Dutch nobility by Queen Beatrix, with the highest noble title Prins de Bourbon de Parme (Prince of Bourbon-Parma), and styled Zijne Koninklijke Hoogheid ('His Royal Highness'). His other titles hold no ground within the Dutch nobility. He does not belong to the House of Orange-Nassau or the limited Dutch royal house, but as a grandson of Queen Juliana and cousin of the present King Willem-Alexander, he is an official member of the more extended Dutch royal family.

Jaime de Bourbon de Parme House of Bourbon-Parma Cadet branch of the House of Bourbon Born: 13 October 1972
Lines of succession
Preceded by Prince Carlos Enrique	Line of succession to the throne of Parma; 2nd position	Succeeded by Prince Sixtus Henry
Preceded by Prince Carlos Enrique	Legitimist line of succession to the French throne 31st position	Succeeded by Prince Sixtus Henry
