= Princess Viktória de Bourbon de Parme =

Hungarian-Dutch lawyer, businesswoman, and royal

Princess Viktória
- Countess of Bardi and of Montizón
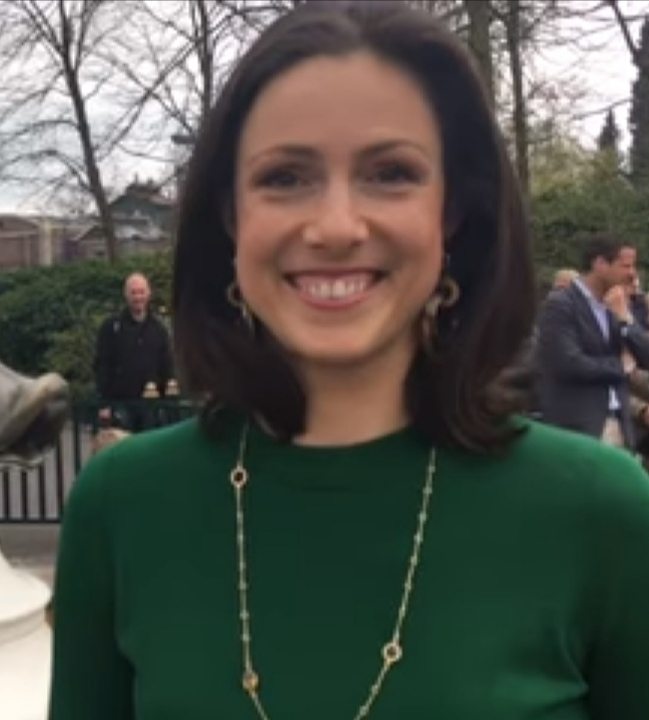
- Princess Viktória in 2017
- Born: Viktória Cservenyák; 25 May 1982 (age 44); Budapest, Hungary
- Spouse: Prince Jaime, Count of Bardi (m. 2013)
- Issue: Princess Zita; Princess Gloria
- House: Bourbon-Parma (by marriage)
- Father: Tibor Cservenyák
- Mother: Dorottya Klára Bartos
- Religion: Catholicism
- Occupation: Lawyer, businesswoman, philanthropist

Princess Viktória, Countess of Bardi (née Cservenyák; born 25 May 1982) is a Hungarian-Dutch lawyer, philanthropist, and corporate strategic manager. Through her marriage to Prince Jaime of Parma, the son of Princess Irene of the Netherlands and Prince Carlos Hugo, Hereditary Duke of Parma, she is a member of the House of Bourbon-Parma and the extended Dutch royal family. Per a 1996 royal decree issued by Queen Beatrix, she is entitled to the style and title Her Royal Highness Princess Viktória de Bourbon de Parme in The Netherlands as a member of the extended royal family.

Viktória worked as a corporate lawyer and a legal advisor for Rabobank prior to marrying into the royal family. She works in strategic management as the Lead of Food Transformation at the World Benchmarking Alliance and, since 2015, has served as the royal patron of Save the Children Netherlands.

== Early life and family ==
Princess Viktória was born Viktória Cservenyák on 25 May 1982 in Budapest to Dorottya Klára Bartos and Tibor Cservenyák, an Olympian water polo player. She is a granddaughter of Olympian swimmer Klára Killermann and a niece of the tennis player Csilla Bartos-Cserepy.

== Education and career ==
Viktória has master's degrees in international business transactions and law from the Nyenrode Business University and the University of Amsterdam. She worked as a corporate lawyer for the firm Allen & Overy and was a legal advisor for Rabobank. She works as the Lead of Food Transformation at the World Benchmarking Alliance, a benchmarking organization, advising on improving nutrition and environment within food systems. At the alliance, she developed the Food and Agricultural Benchmark and has worked with the Access to Seeds Index and Seafood Stewardship Index.

Since 2015, she has served as patron of Save the Children Netherlands. In May 2018, she took part in the Seeds & Chips International Food and Innovation Summit in Milan and moderated a panel on helping smallholder farmers.

== Personal life ==
=== Marriage and issue ===
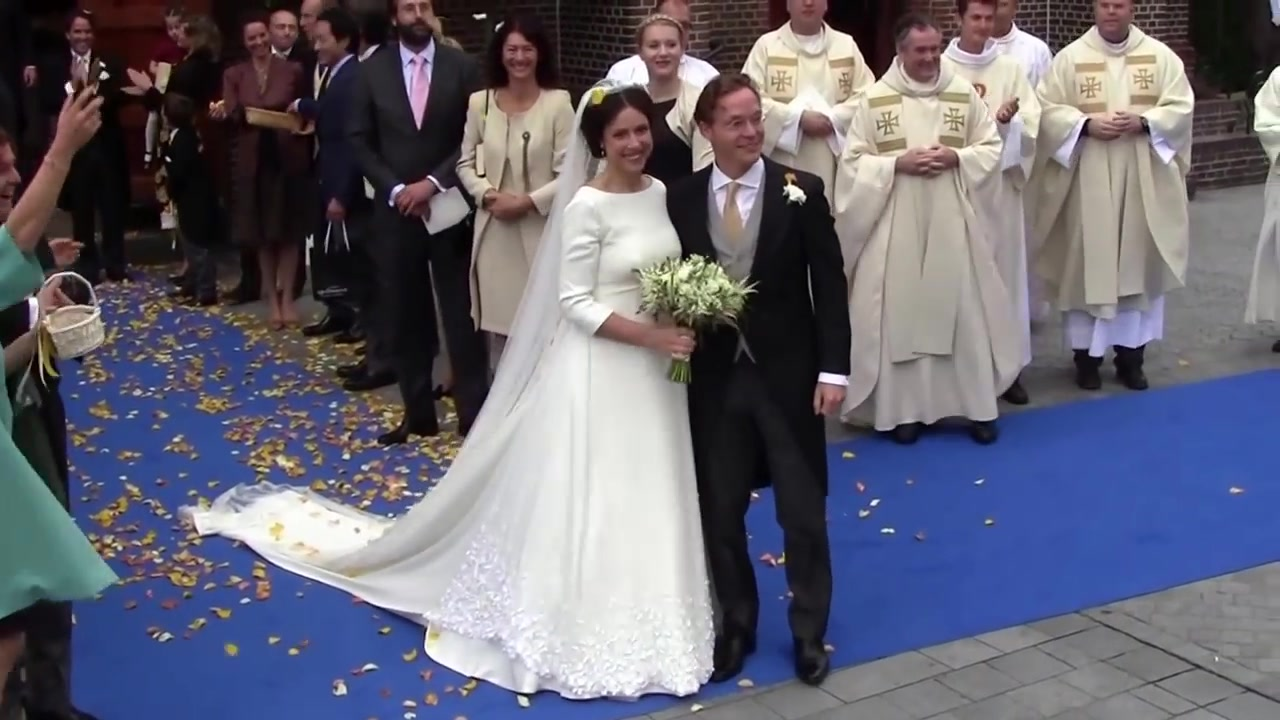
Princess Viktória and Prince Jaime on their wedding day in 2013

On 12 August 2013, Viktória and Prince Jaime of Bourbon-Parma, Count of Bardi announced their engagement. They married in a civil ceremony in Wijk bij Duurstede on 3 October 2013. A religious wedding was held on 5 October 2013 at the Church of Our Lady of the Heavens in Apeldoorn. The wedding was attended by members of the Dutch royal family, including Former Queen Beatrix, King Willem-Alexander and Queen Maxima. Per a 1996 royal decree issued by Queen Beatrix, Viktória was incorporated into the Dutch nobility and became entitled to the style Royal Highness upon her marriage. Also, she was bestowed, before her marriage, with the title Countess of Montizòn by her brother-in-law, Prince Carlos, Duke of Parma, in 2013.

They have two daughters:

- Princess Zita Clara of Bourbon-Parma (Dutch: Prinses Zita Clara de Bourbon de Parme; born in Amsterdam on 21 February 2014)
- Princess Gloria Irene of Bourbon-Parma (Dutch: Prinses Gloria Irene de Bourbon de Parme; born in Rome on 9 May 2016)

== Activities and patronages ==
In February 2017, Princess Viktória visited Mozambique in her representative role for Save the Children, visiting the town of Beira and the province of Sofala, where she learned about chronic malnutrition and attended a cooking class to raise awareness of all the food available in Mozambique.

In May 2018, as patroness of Save the Children, she participated in an international conference on food innovation held in Milan, Italy, in which the organization had also taken part. Her husband, Prince Jaime, was also present. Only the month before she had attended another food conference, in Singapore. In June 2018, at the end of her husband's appointment as Dutch ambassador to the Holy See, Princess Viktória, Prince Jaime, and their daughters were received in a private audience by Pope Francis. In November 2018, the Princess attended the so-called "Nutrition dinner" organized by her with leftover food, in The Hague, and as a patroness of Save the Children she spoke about the nutritional problems of many children around the world and said she was trying to waste food as little as possible.

In May 2019, Princess Viktória attended a conference held at the Peace Palace in The Hague, The Netherlands, and as patroness of Save the Children, spoke about the war and its consequences for children.

== Titles and styles ==
Styles of Princess Viktória, Countess of Bardi
- Reference style: Her Royal Highness
- Spoken style: Your Royal Highness

=== Titles and styles ===
- 25 May 1982 – 5 October 2013: Miss Viktória Cservenyák
- 5 October 2013 – present: Her Royal Highness Princess Viktória, Princess Jamie of Parma, The Countess of Bardi
  - Officially in the Netherlands: 5 October 2013 – present: Her Royal Highness Princess Viktória de Bourbon de Parme
