= Hans Gualthérie van Weezel =

Dutch diplomat and politician

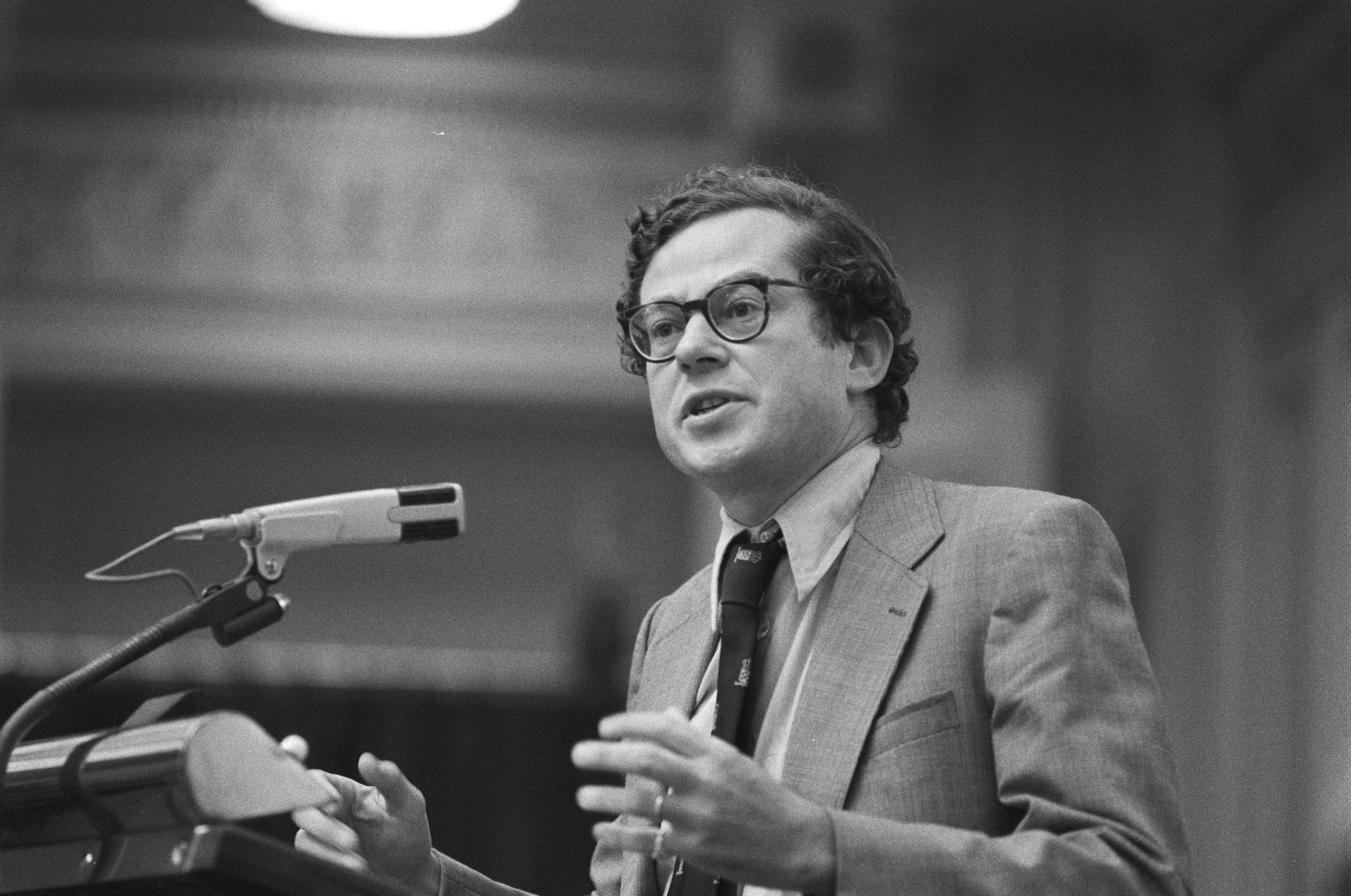
- Hans Gualthérie van Weezel in a House of Representatives debate in 1979

Member of the House of Representatives
- In office 8 June 1977 – 1 August 1992

Permanent Representative of the Netherlands to the Council of Europe
- In office 1 September 1992 – August 1998

Ambassador of the Netherlands to Luxembourg
- In office August 1998 – 2005

Personal details
- Born: 26 June 1941 (age 85) Velsen, Netherlands
- Party: Christian Historical Union (until 1980), Christian Democratic Appeal (since 1980)
- Spouse: Gerarda Gezina Jolande de Visser
- Children: 3, including Annemarie, Duchess of Parma
- Education: Leiden University

Johan Stephan Leonard "Hans" Gualthérie van Weezel (born 26 July 1941) is a Dutch former diplomat and politician. He worked as a diplomat for the Dutch Ministry for Foreign Affairs between 1970 and 1977. Subsequently, he served in the House of Representatives between 1977 and 1992. After his political career ended he returned to diplomacy and was Permanent Representative of the Netherlands to the Council of Europe until August 1998 and afterwards Ambassador to Luxembourg until 2005.

== Career ==
Hans Gualthérie van Weezel was born on 26 July 1941 in Velsen, during World War II. His father Jan was active in the Dutch resistance and later became chief commissioner of police in The Hague. Gualthérie van Weezel went to high school in The Hague, graduating in 1962. He subsequently went to Leiden University to study Dutch law. He went to study law rather than history, which he had intended to do, since his father valued the title of master of law over a title in history.

After his studies Gualthérie van Weezel joined the diplomatic service of the Ministry for Foreign Affairs. He was third embassy secretary in Brussels between 1971 and 1975 and afterwards was second embassy secretary in Lagos for two years. He then returned to the Netherlands and was spokesperson for the Ministry until June 1977.

Gualthérie van Weezel joined the House of Representatives after the 1977 general elections. For his first election he was number 33 on the candidate list and in all subsequent elections he was placed lower on the list. He was a member of the Christian Historical Union, which in 1980 merged into the Christian Democratic Appeal. In the House of Representatives Gualthérie van Weezel served as spokesperson for Foreign Affairs for the Christian Democratic Appeal. He was on the right side in the party. While his party struggled with the issue of the placement of 48 cruise missiles in the Netherlands, Gualthérie van Weezel suggested placing 84.

After his political career ended in 1992 he returned to diplomacy and became Permanent Representative of the Netherlands to the Council of Europe. In 1994 he was warned by Christian Democratic Appeal chair Wim van Velzen that writing a book on his political career might hurt his diplomatic career. Gualthérie van Weezel saw this as an encouragement and his book Rechts door het midden was published in 1994. In his book he argued that the Christian Democratic Appeal, being on in the political opposition, should place itself on the right of the political spectrum. He served as Permanent Representative until August 1998, and subsequently Ambassador to Luxembourg until 2005.

In 2014, as head of the Commission Integral Supervision Return of the Ministry of Security and Justice he stated that the asylum policy of the Netherlands would attract more refugees. He argued that a European policy to counter refugee flows to Europe should be created.

== Personal life ==
Gualthérie van Weezel is married to Gerarda Gezina Jolande "Ank" de Visser. The couple has two daughters and one son. His daughter Annemarie married Carlos, Duke of Parma in 2010.

Gualthérie van Weezel was made Knight in the Order of the Netherlands Lion on 28 April 1989.

== Works ==
- Rechts door het midden (1994)
