= Archduchess Maria Anna of Austria (born 1882) =

Archduchess Maria Anna
- Princess Elias of Bourbon-Parma
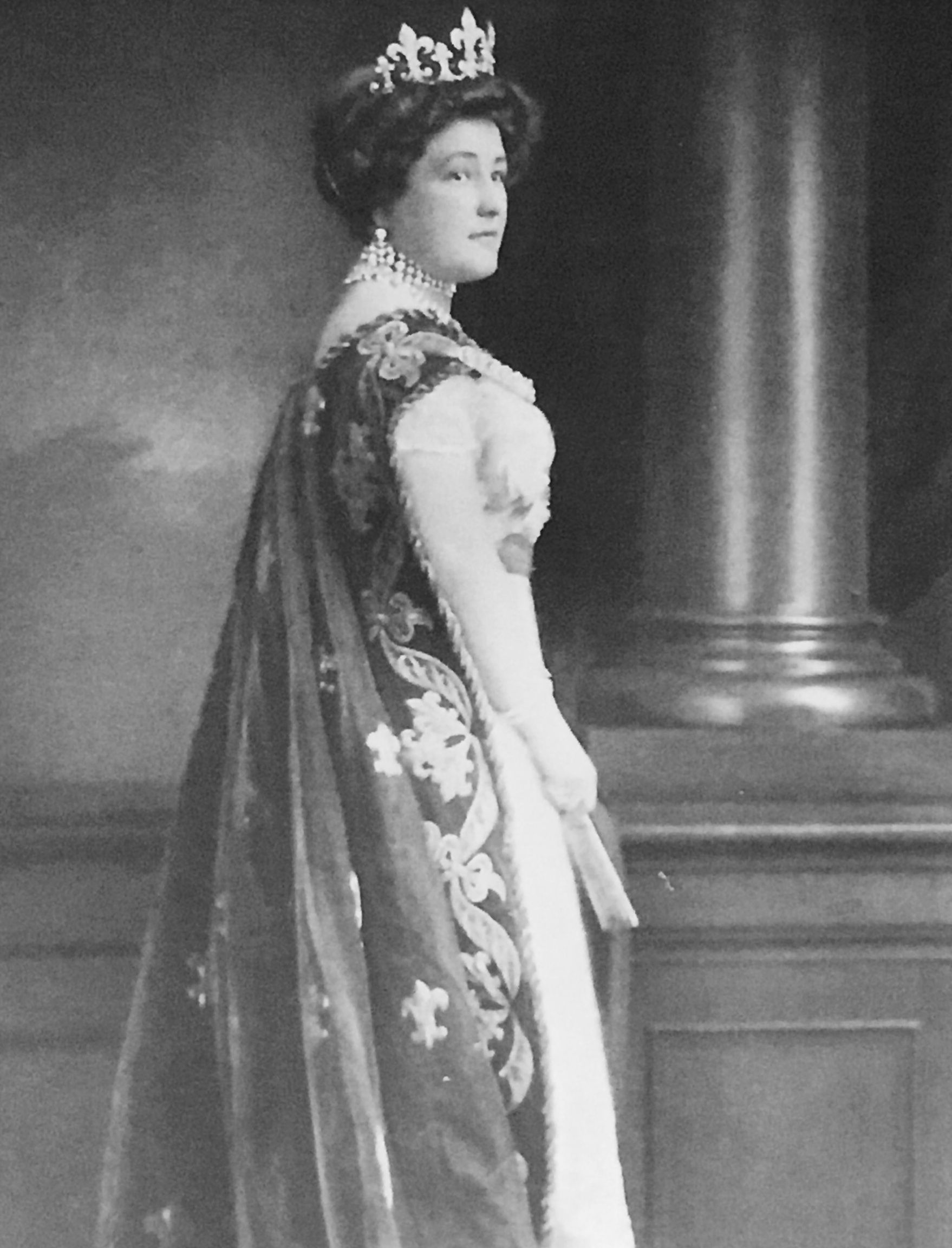
- Archduchess Maria Anna in 1902
- Born: 6 January 1882; Linz, Austria-Hungary
- Died: 25 February 1940 (aged 58); Lausanne, Vaud, Switzerland
- Burial: Prinz Bourbon-Parma Gruftkapelle, Neue Glasshütte, near Mönichkirchen, Austria
- Spouse: Prince Elias of Bourbon-Parma (m. 1903)
- Issue: Princess Elisabetta; Prince Carlo; Princess Maria Francesca; Robert Hugo, Duke of Parma; Prince Francesco; Princess Giovanna; Infanta Alicia, Duchess of Calabria; Princess Maria Cristina
Names
- German: Maria Anna Isabelle Epiphanie Eugenie Gabriele
- House: Habsburg-Lorraine
- Father: Archduke Friedrich, Duke of Teschen
- Mother: Princess Isabella of Croÿ

Archduchess Maria Anna Isabelle Epiphanie Eugenie Gabriele of Austria, full German name: Maria Anna Isabelle Epiphanie Eugenie Gabriele, Erzherzogin von Österreich (6 January 1882, Linz, Upper Austria, Austria-Hungary; 25 February 1940, Lausanne, Vaud, Switzerland) was a member of the Teschen branch of the House of Habsburg-Lorraine and an Archduchess of Austria and Princess of Bohemia, Hungary, and Tuscany by birth. Through her marriage to Prince Elias of Bourbon-Parma (later the pretender Duke of Parma), Maria Anna was also a member of the House of Bourbon-Parma and a Princess of Bourbon-Parma.

== Early life ==
Maria Anna was the second child and daughter of Archduke Friedrich, Duke of Teschen and his wife Princess Isabella of Croÿ.

== Marriage and issue ==
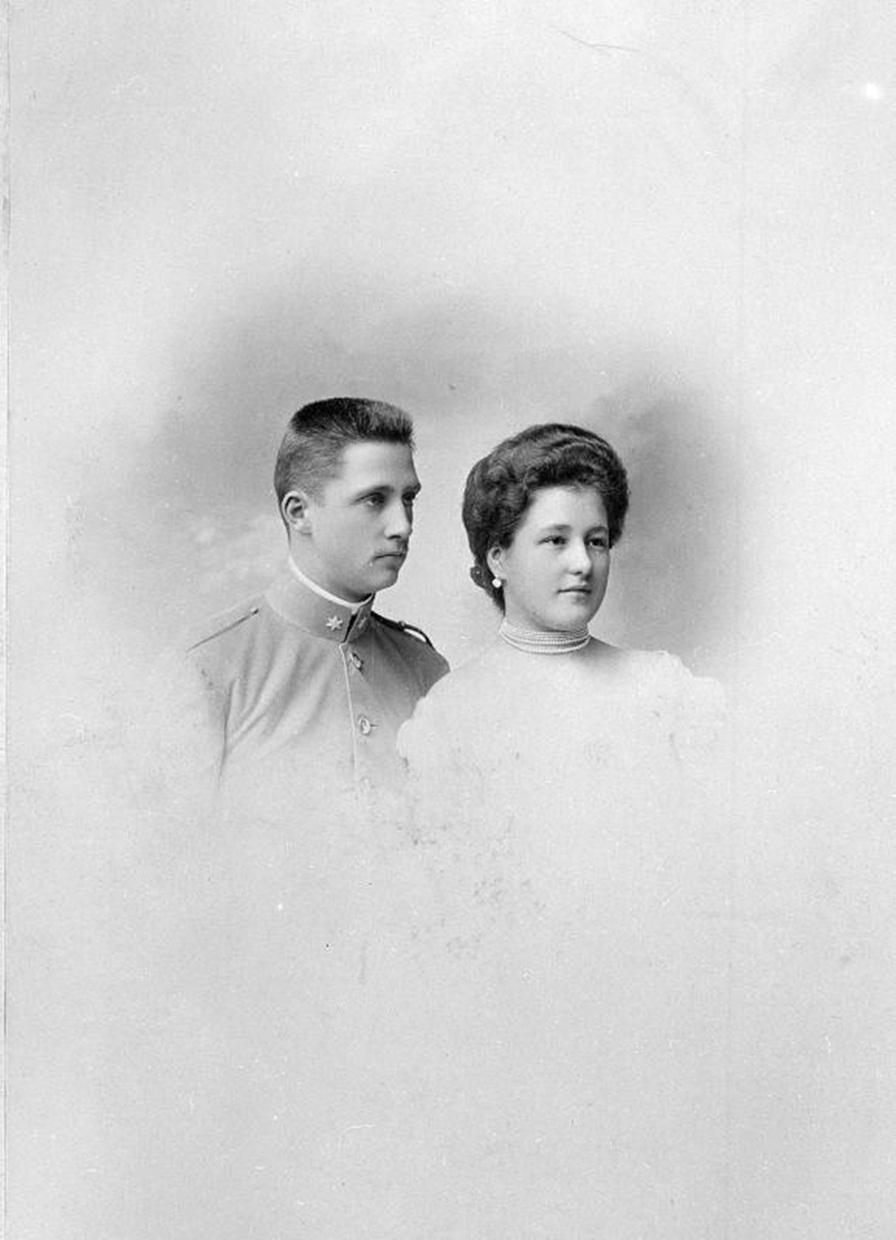
Maria Anna with her husband Elias

Maria Anna married Prince Elias of Bourbon-Parma, the youngest son of Robert I, Duke of Parma, and his first wife, Princess Maria Pia of Bourbon-Two Sicilies, on 25 May 1903 in Vienna.

Elias gave Maria Anna an engagement ring with an oval ruby surrounded by diamonds. Following her marriage, Maria Anna amassed a significant collection of jewellery, both as wedding gifts and through later gifts and inheritances. Emperor Franz Josef gave her a diamond tiara made by Kochert, the royal jewelers in Vienna. Maria Anna produced an inventory of these jewels in 1932. The collection was auctioned by Sotheby's in November 2018.

Maria Anna and Elias had eight children:

- Princess Elisabetta (17 March 1904 – 13 June 1983); she died unmarried.
- Prince Carlo (22 September 1905 – 26 September 1912); he died of poliomyelitis.
- Princess Maria Francesca (5 September 1906 – 1994); she died unmarried.
- Robert Hugo, Duke of Parma (7 August 1909 – 25 November 1974); he died unmarried.
- Prince Francesco (14 June 1913 – 29 May 1939); he died unmarried.
- Princess Giovanna (8 July 1916 – 1 November 1949); she never married and was killed in a shooting accident in La Toledana, Spain.
- Princess Alicia (13 November 1917 – 28 March 2017); she married Infante Alfonso, Duke of Calabria.
- Princess Maria Cristina (7 June 1925 – 1 September 2009); she died unmarried.

== Ancestry ==
Ancestors of Archduchess Maria Anna of Austria (born 1882)

8. Archduke Charles, Duke of Teschen
4. Archduke Karl Ferdinand of Austria
9. Princess Henrietta of Nassau-Weilburg
2. Archduke Friedrich, Duke of Teschen
10. Archduke Joseph, Palatine of Hungary
5. Archduchess Elisabeth Franziska of Austria
11. Duchess Maria Dorothea of Württemberg
1. Archduchess Maria Anna of Austria
12. Alfred, 10th Duke of Croÿ
6. Rudolf, 11th Duke of Croÿ
13. Princess Eleonore of Salm-Salm
3. Princess Isabella of Croÿ
14. Eugène, 8th Prince of Ligne
7. Princess Natalie of Ligne
15. Nathalie de Trazegnies
