= Carlos Hugo, Duke of Parma =

Head of the House of Bourbon-Parma from 1977 to 2010

Carlos Hugo
- Duke of Parma
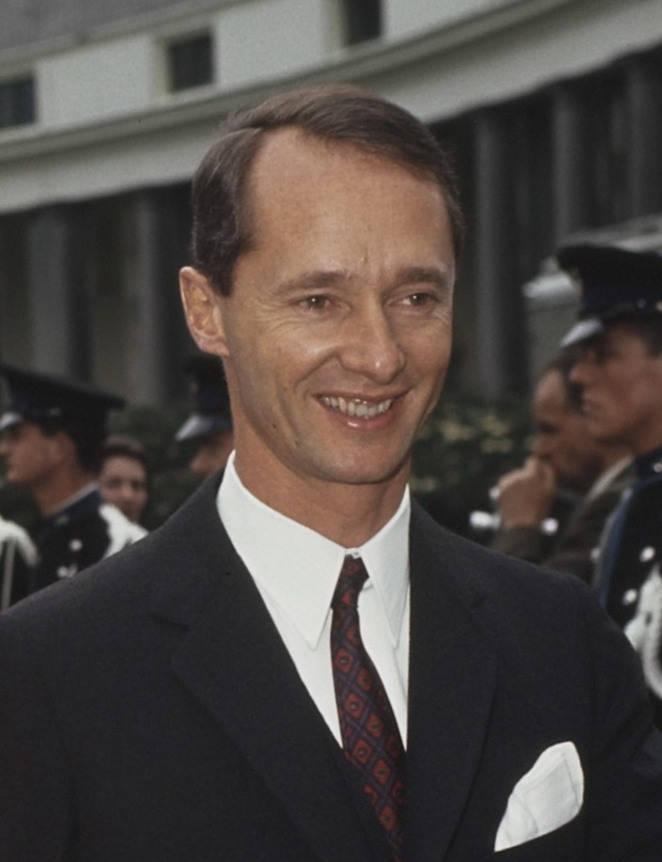
- Carlos Hugo in 1968

Head of the House of Bourbon-Parma
- Tenure: 7 May 1977 – 18 August 2010
- Predecessor: Duke Xavier
- Successor: Duke Carlos
- Born: 8 April 1930; Paris, France
- Died: 18 August 2010 (aged 80); Barcelona, Spain
- Burial: 28 August 2010; Sanctuary of Santa Maria della Steccata
- Spouse: Princess Irene of the Netherlands (m. 1964; div. 1981)
- Issue: Prince Carlos, Duke of Parma; Princess Margarita, Countess of Colorno; Prince Jaime, Count of Bardi; Princess Carolina, Marchioness of Sala
- House: Bourbon-Parma
- Father: Prince Xavier of Bourbon-Parma
- Mother: Madeleine de Bourbon-Busset
- Religion: Roman Catholicism

Carlos Hugo, Duke of Parma and Piacenza (8 April 1930 – 18 August 2010) was the head of the ducal House of Bourbon-Parma from 1977 until his death. Carlos Hugo was a Carlist claimant to the throne of Spain and sought to change the political direction of the Carlist movement through the Carlist Party, of which he was the official head during the fatal Montejurra incidents. His marriage to Princess Irene of the Netherlands in 1964 caused a constitutional crisis in the Netherlands.

== Background ==
Carlos Hugo was the son of Xavier, Duke of Parma, and Madeleine de Bourbon-Busset and was baptized Hugues Marie Sixte Robert Louis Jean Georges Benoît Michel. He was a direct male descendant of Louis XIV. On 28 June 1963 he was officially renamed Charles Hugues, by judgment of the court of appeal of la Seine, France.

In 1977, his father died, and Carlos Hugo succeeded him claiming the thrones of Parma, Etruria and Spain. He was a French citizen, and from 1980, a naturalized Spanish citizen.

He passed his baccalaureate in Montreal, and studied in Paris and at the University of Oxford.

== Carlism ==
Carlism is a Spanish political movement founded in the 19th century to uphold the claim of Carlos Hugo's branch of the House of Bourbon to the Spanish throne.

In 1975 Don Javier abdicated as the Carlist king in favor of his elder son Carlos Hugo who assumed Carlist leadership in August 1975. In Francoist Spain, the organization of Carlism has been known as the Traditionalist Communion and played an important role in the Spanish Civil War within the Nationalist Faction.

The movement split between the followers of Carlos Hugo and his socialist and liberal reforms and the traditionalists who rejected him including his younger brother Sixto Enrique who refused to accept him as king.

In May 1976, a year after Franco's death, two Carlist sympathizers from the Carlos Hugo faction were shot down by far-right terrorists during an annual Carlist convocation. Among the terrorists were Stefano Delle Chiaie and members of the Argentine Anticommunist Alliance (Triple A), with logistic support from Francoist elements inside Spanish intelligence agencies and the Civil Guard. This incident became known as the Montejurra massacre.

In a private letter, Don Javier claimed that at Montejurra "the Carlists have confronted the revolutionaries", which has been interpreted as the followers of Don Sixto being the real Carlists according to Don Javier.

On 4 March, accompanied by his son Sixto, Don Javier was interviewed by the Spanish press and his responses showed Carlist orthodoxy. That same day he issued a declaration certified by a Paris notary objecting to his name being used to legitimize a "grave doctrinal error within Carlism", and implicitly disowned the political line promoted by Carlos Hugo. In order to justify that declaration, Carlos Hugo alerted the police that his father had been abducted by Sixto, an accusation which was denied publicly by Don Javier himself, who had to be hospitalized heavily affected by the scandal generated.

Shortly afterwards Don Javier issued another declaration, certified by a different Paris notary, confirming his oldest son as "my only political successor and head of Carlism". Then it was Doña Magdalena who declared that her husband had been taken by Carlos Hugo from hospital against medical advice and his own will, and that Carlos Hugo had threatened his father to obtain his signature on the second declaration. Eventually Don Javier was transferred to Switzerland, where he soon died. The widow blamed the oldest son and three daughters for his death. She repudiated and disinherited her children Carlos Hugo, María Teresa, Cecilia and Nieves, and ordered that upon her death they could not attend the wake for his corpse in the castle of Lignières.

On 28 September 2003 at Arbonne in France, Carlos Hugo re-asserted his Carlist claim.

== Marriage and family ==
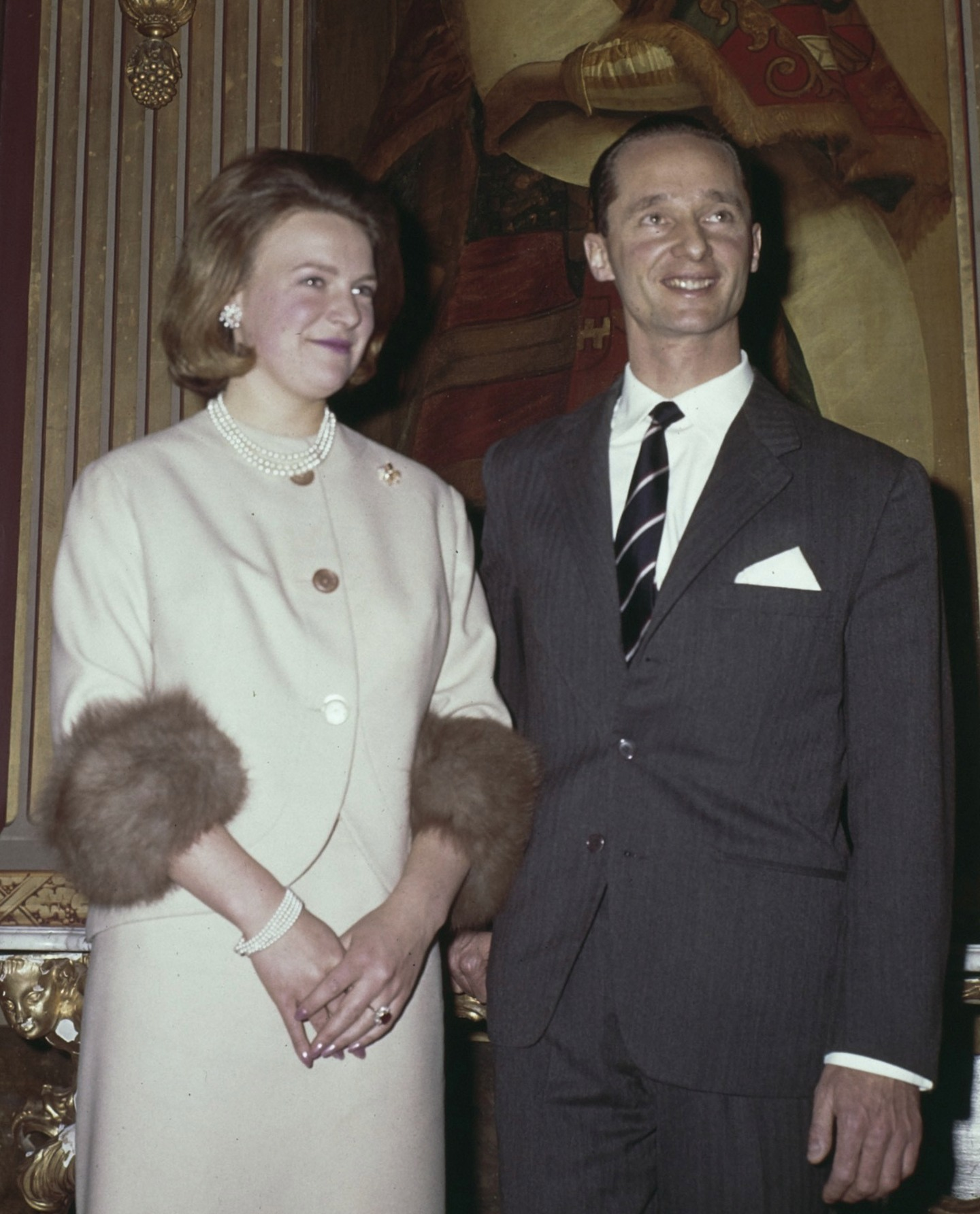
Carlos Hugo and Princess Irene in 1964

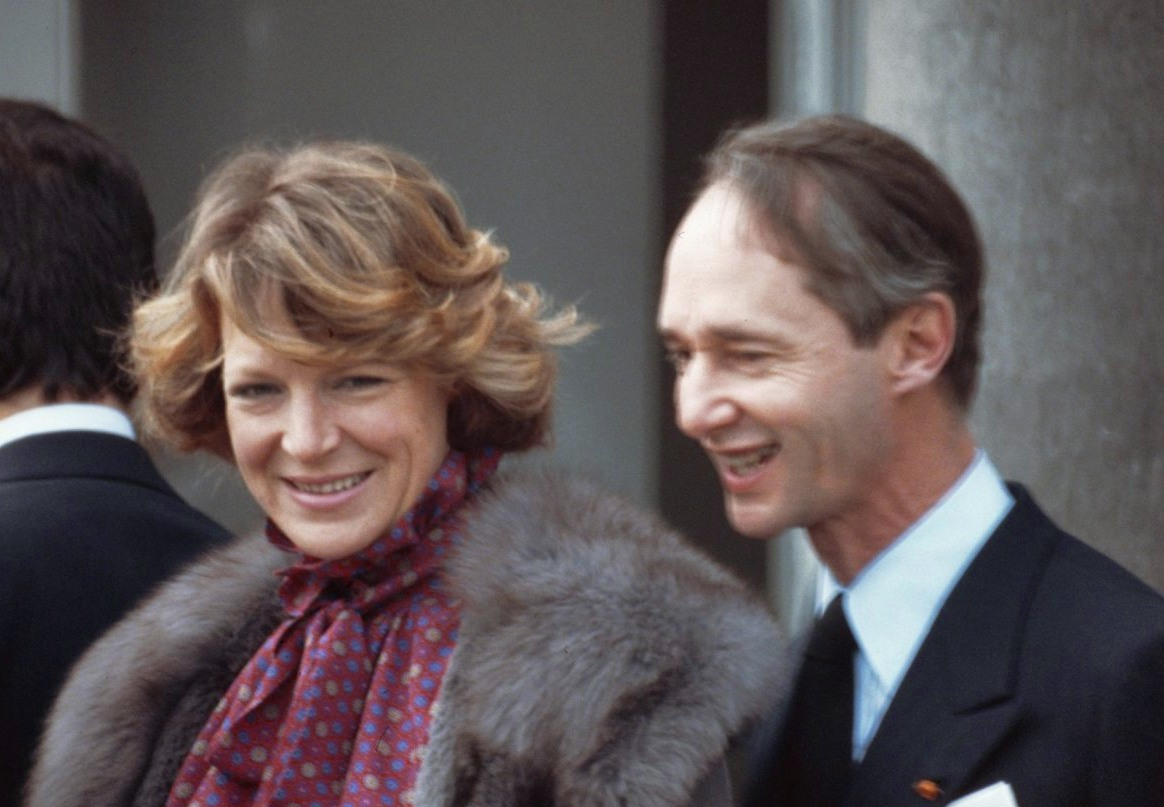
Carlos Hugo and Princess Irene in 1978

Carlos Hugo's engagement to Princess Irene of the Netherlands, daughter of Queen Juliana of the Netherlands, caused a constitutional crisis in the Netherlands for several reasons. Irene lost her rights of succession to the Dutch throne because the government refused to enact a law permitting the marriage. Her mother could not go to Madrid to talk Irene out of the marriage and of her conversion to Catholicism because the government advised her against it. The issue that prevented the government from making a law permitting the marriage was Carlos's claim to the Spanish throne. The Dutch government saw international political difficulties arising from a possible heir to the Dutch throne holding a controversial claim to the throne of a foreign state.

Carlos Hugo and Irene were married on 29 April 1964, in the Borghese Chapel at the Basilica di Santa Maria Maggiore in Rome, by Cardinal Paolo Giobbe, the former Apostolic Nuncio to the Netherlands. No other members of the Dutch royal family were present; Irene's parents watched the ceremony on television. After the ceremony, Carlos Hugo and Irene had a private audience with Pope Paul VI. They spent their honeymoon in Las Palmas de Gran Canaria, after which they settled in Madrid.

Carlos Hugo and Irene divorced on 26 May 1981. They had four children:

- Prince Carlos Javier Bernardo Sixto María, Duke of Parma (27 January 1970). He has a natural son, Carlos Hugo (born 20 January 1997), with Brigitte Klynstra. On 12 June 2010, Prince Carlos married Annemarie Cecilia Gualthérie van Weezel. They have three children:
  - Princess Luisa of Bourbon-Parme (10 May 2012)
  - Princess Cecilia of Bourbon-Parme (17 October 2013)
  - Carlos Enrique Leonard, Hereditary Prince of Bourbon-Parma (24 April 2016)
- Princess Margarita María Beatriz of Bourbon Parma (13 October 1972) she married Edwin de Roy van Zuydewijn on 22 September 2001 and they were divorced on 8 November 2006. She remarried Tjalling Siebe ten Cate on 2 May 2008. They have two daughters:
  - Julia ten Cate (3 September 2008)
  - Paola ten Cate (25 February 2011)
- Prince Jaime Bernardo of Bourbon Parma (13 October 1972); he married Viktoria Cservenyak on 3 October 2013. They have two daughters:
  - Princess Zita Clara of Bourbon-Parma (21 February 2014)
  - Princess Gloria Irene of Bourbon-Parma (9 May 2016)
- Princess María Carolina Cristina of Bourbon Parma (23 June 1974); she married Albert Alphons Ludgerus Brenninkmeijer on 21 April 2012. They have two children:
  - Alaïa-Maria Brenninkmeijer (20 May 2014)
  - Xavier Brenninkmeijer (16 December 2015)

In 2003, his daughter Margarita revealed that her father had an illegitimate son with a former nursery maid, called Javier, born in 1983.

== Death ==
In February 2008 it was revealed that Carlos Hugo was being treated for cancer. On 2 August 2010, he announced, via his official website, that his health was further deteriorating. He died on 18 August 2010 in Barcelona at the age of 80. Carlos Hugo's remains were taken from Barcelona to The Hague and were laid in state for family members and close relatives in the Fagel Dome on the estate of the Noordeinde Palace (one of the three official palaces of the Dutch royal family). On 28 August, the body was transported to Parma in Italy and interred in the crypt of the Sanctuary of Santa Maria della Steccata.

== Honours ==
=== Dynastic honours ===
Carlos-Hugo claimed the headship of the Constantinian Order of Saint George as hereditary heir to the House of Farnese's Duchy of Parma, the Farnese dukes having been recognised as grand masters of the order in 1699, although in 1706 the church of Rome confirmed the order's grand magistry to the Farnese's heirs (the House of Bourbon since 1731) in accordance with male primogeniture.

As a claimant to the throne of Spain, Carlos Hugo also claimed to be the Grand Master of the Spanish Order of the Golden Fleece At his funeral the chain of the Order of the Golden Fleece was put on his coffin, and the prince wore the insignia of the order during his marriage.

Country	Appointment	Ribbon	Other
(Duchy of Parma) House of Bourbon-Parma	Grand Master of the Parmese Sacred Military Constantinian Order of Saint George		
(Duchy of Parma) House of Bourbon-Parma	Grand Master of the Order of Saint Louis for Civil Merit		
(Duchy of Parma) House of Bourbon-Parma	Grand Master of the Order of the Legitimidad Proscrita		
(Duchy of Parma) House of Bourbon-Parma	Grand Master of the Order of St. George for Military Merit		
(Duchy of Parma) House of Bourbon-Parma	Order of the Golden Fleece (Claimant)		
Holy See	Knight Grand Cross of the Order of the Holy Sepulchre		
Netherlands	Grand Cross of the Order of the House of Orange		

== Ancestry ==
Ancestors of Carlos Hugo, Duke of Parma

8. Charles III, Duke of Parma
4. Robert I, Duke of Parma
9. Princess Louise of Artois
2. Xavier, Duke of Parma
10. Miguel I of Portugal
5. Infanta Maria Antonia of Portugal
11. Princess Adelaide of Löwenstein-Wertheim-Rosenberg
1. Carlos Hugo, Duke of Parma
12. Henri de Bourbon, comte de Lignières
6. Georges de Bourbon, comte de Lignières
13. Adrienne de Mailly-Nesle
3. Madeleine de Bourbon-Busset
14. René de Kerret, vicomte de Quillien
7. Marie Jeanne de Kerret de Quillien
15. Marie Léonie Gautier

== Bibliography ==
- Robert E. Wilson, "The Claim of Carlos-Hugo de Bourbon-Parma to the Spanish Throne", Background 8 (November 1964): 187–193.

Carlos Hugo, Duke of Parma House of Bourbon-Parma Cadet branch of the House of Bourbon Born: 8 April 1930 Died: 18 August 2010
Titles in pretence
Preceded by Xavier	— TITULAR — Duke of Parma; 7 May 1977 – 18 August 2010; Reason for succession failure: Annexed by Kingdom of Italy	Succeeded by Carlos
Preceded by Xavier	— TITULAR — King of Spain; Carlist claimant 20 April 1975 – 18 August 2010	Succeeded by Carlos
