= Tibor Cservenyák =

Hungarian water polo player (born 1948)

Personal information
- Born: August 8, 1948 (age 77) Szolnok, Hungary

Sport
- Sport: Water polo
Medal record
Representing Hungary
Water polo
Gold medal – first place	1976 Montreal	Team competition
Silver medal – second place	1972 Munich	Team competition
World Championships
Gold medal – first place	1973 Belgrade	Team competition
Silver medal – second place	1975 Cali	Team competition
Silver medal – second place	1982 Guayaquil	Team competition
European Championships
Gold medal – first place	1974 Vienna	Team competition
Silver medal – second place	1970 Barcelona	Team competition
Silver medal – second place	1983 Rome	Team competition
Bronze medal – third place	1981 Split	Team competition

Tibor Cservenyák (born 8 August 1948) is a Hungarian former water polo player who competed in the 1972 Summer Olympics and in the 1976 Summer Olympics.

== Biography ==
From the age of ten he played water polo for Szolnoki Dózsa, from 1973 for Újpesti Dózsa, and then from 1983 for Volán Sports Club for two years. Between 1970 and 1984 he played 134 times in the Hungarian national team. He was a member of the 1976 Summer Olympics, and won the title of Olympic Champion for the Hungarian team in Montreal.

In 1975, he graduated at the Budapest University of Technology as a chemical engineer, and then was since 1976 water polo coach at the Semmelweis University. After this, he settled in Switzerland, where worked as a chemist. After his retirement, he was coach in Solothurn, Switzerland from 1984 to 1990 and then captain of the Switzerland men's national water polo team until 1992.

His daughter. Viktória, married Prince Jaime of Bourbon-Parma, Count of Bardi.

== See also ==
- Hungary men's Olympic water polo team records and statistics
- List of Olympic champions in men's water polo
- List of Olympic medalists in water polo (men)
- List of men's Olympic water polo tournament goalkeepers
- List of world champions in men's water polo
- List of World Aquatics Championships medalists in water polo
