= Klára Killermann =

Hungarian swimmer (born 1929)

Personal information
- Full name: Bartos-Killermann Klára
- Nationality: Hungary
- Born: 23 June 1929 Tatabánya
- Died: 16 July 2012 (aged 83)
- Height: 1.64 m (5 ft 5 in)
- Weight: 61 kg (134 lb)

Sport
- Sport: Swimming
- Strokes: breaststroke
- Club: Ferencvárosi TC
Medal record
European Championships (LC)
Bronze medal – third place	1954 Turin	200 m breaststroke

Klára Killermann (also known as Killermann-Bartos) (born 23 June 1929 in Tatabánya, died 16 July 2012) was a breaststroke swimmer from Hungary. She first won a national championship in 1942, as a 13-year-old, to the big surprise of the Hungarian swimming sport, which at that time was world-famous. In 1951 she won gold medal in 100 and 200m breast stroke at the University Games in Berlin. At the Helsinki Olympics, in 1952, she had exactly the same time as the third placed Helen Gordon 2.57,6, but according to the judges, she was placed fourth, and did not win the bronze medal. At the European Championships in 1954 she won bronze in 200m breaststroke.

Her husband was a national rowing champion, and she has two daughters, Dorottya Klára and Csilla. Her granddaughter Viktória married Prince Jaime, Count of Bardi, the son of Princess Irene of the Netherlands, herself a sister of the former Queen Beatrix. Jaime and Viktória's oldest daughter, Princess Zita Clara, is named in her memory.
