= Annemarie, Duchess of Parma =

Dutch journalist, consultant, and princess

Annemarie
- Hereditary Duchess of Parma; Countess of Molina
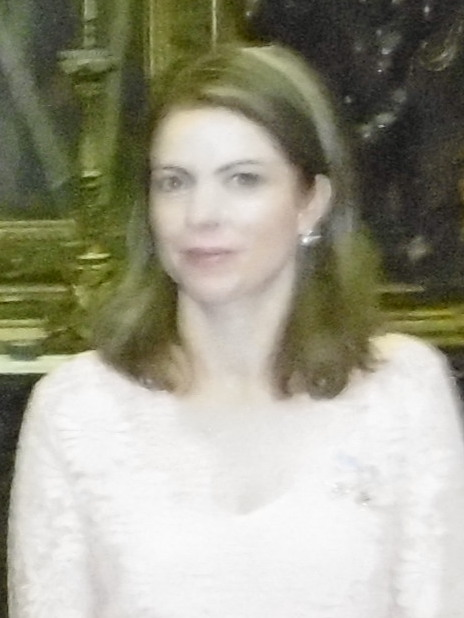
- Annemarie in 2017

Consort of the Head of the House of Bourbon-Parma
- Tenure: 18 August 2010 – present
- Born: Annemarie Cecilia Gualthérie van Weezel; 18 December 1977 (age 48); The Hague, The Netherlands
- Spouse: Prince Carlos, Hereditary Duke of Parma (m. 2010)
- Issue: Princess Luisa, Marchioness of Castell'Arquato; Princess Cecilia, Countess of Berceto; Prince Carlos Enrique, Prince of Piacenza
Names
- Annemarie Cecilia de Bourbon de Parme
- House: Bourbon-Parma (by marriage)
- Father: Hans Gualthérie van Weezel
- Mother: Gerarda Gezina Jolande de Visser
- Education: Utrecht University
- Occupations: Journalist, Consultant

Princess Annemarie, Hereditary Duchess of Parma (née Gualthérie van Weezel; born 18 December 1977) is a Dutch consultant, former journalist, and a member of the House of Bourbon-Parma and the extended Dutch royal family. She worked as a television journalist, specializing in European politics, for the Dutch station NOS Journaal. In 2011, she authored the book De smaak van macht, which focused on the lives of five former Dutch prime ministers. In 2019, Annemarie left journalism and became the first woman to make partner at the consulting firm Ward Howell International.

She is married to Prince Carlos of Parma, the pretender to the defunct throne of the extinct Duchy of Parma and Piacenza and the Carlist claimant to the Spanish throne. As such, Annemarie is considered the Spanish queen by Carlists. She is the Countess of Molina in her own right, having been bestowed with the title by her father-in-law, Prince Carlos Hugo, in 2010. Per a 1996 royal decree issued by Queen Beatrix of the Netherlands, upon her marriage she became entitled to the style and title Her Royal Highness Princess Annemarie de Bourbon de Parme in the Netherlands as a member of the extended royal family.

== Early life and family ==
Annemarie was born on 18 December 1977 in The Hague to Hans Gualthérie van Weezel and Gerarda Gezina Jolande "Ank" de Visser. She has an elder brother and a younger sister. Her father is a Christian Democratic politician and diplomat who has served in the House of Representatives of the Netherlands, as a member of the European Council. He also served as the Dutch Ambassador to Luxembourg. Her grandfather, Jan Gualthérie de Weezel was the head of The Hague police and a member of the Dutch Resistance during World War II. Through her great-grandmother, Cecilia Louise Boissevain, she is a descendent of the patrician Boissevain family. Annemarie is also a great-great-great-granddaughter of George Nugent, 1st Marquess of Westmeath, through his illegitimate daughter Cecilia Henrietta Catherine Nugent.

== Education and career ==
Annemarie attended Gymnasium Haganum from 1990 to 1992, before transferring to the Lycée international des Pontonniers in Strasbourg, obtaining a French baccalaureate in 1995. She studied corporate communication at James Madison University in the United States from 1995 to 1996 before completing law school at Utrecht University in 2002. She also completed a master's degree in media studies at the University of Groningen in 2003 and studied law at the Sydney Law School and Chinese business law at East China University of Political Science and Law.

After completing her studies, she worked as a parliamentary journalist in The Hague and in Brussels for NOS Journaal. She specialized in European politics and authored a book about five former Prime Ministers of the Netherlands in 2011 titled De smaak van macht. In her book, she interviewed Piet de Jong, Dries van Agt, Ruud Lubbers, Wim Kok, and Jan Peter Balkenende about their time in office.

In June 2019, Annemarie left her job as a journalist and began working as a recruiter for the consulting firm Ward Howell International in Amsterdam in October 2019. She became the first woman partner at Ward Howell International in 2019. She advises companies on diversity and inclusion, as well as female leadership. Annemarie is a member of the Leading Executives Advancing Diversity Network.

== Personal life ==
On 7 October 2009 the House of Bourbon-Parma announced Annemarie's engagement to Carlos, then Crown Prince of Parma, the son of Carlos Hugo, Duke of Parma and Princess Irene of the Netherlands. The civil marriage took place on 12 June 2010 in Wijk bij Duurstede. The church wedding was to have taken place in La Cambre Abbey on 28 August 2010, but was postponed due to the illness of the prince's father. In a final announcement about his deteriorating health, the Duke of Parma conferred Carlos as the next Head of the House of Bourbon-Parma and bestowed Annemarie with the title Contessa di Molina (Countess of Molina). The couple married in a Catholic ceremony at La Cambre Abbey on 20 November 2010. The wedding was attended by Máxima, Princess of Orange, Willem-Alexander, Prince of Orange, Queen Beatrix, Prince Jean of Luxembourg, and Duarte Pio, Duke of Braganza. According to a 1996 decree issued by Queen Beatrix, Annemarie and her husband are part of the Dutch nobility and are entitled to the princely Bourbon-Parme title with the style Royal Highness in The Netherlands as members of the extended royal family.

Annemarie and Carlos have three children:

- Princess Luisa Irene Constance Anna Maria of Parma, The Marchioness of Castell'Arquato (Dutch: Prinses Luisa Irene de Bourbon de Parme; born 9 May 2012, The Hague).
- Princess Cecilia Maria Johanna Beatrix of Parma, The Countess of Berceto (Dutch: Prinses Cecilia Maria de Bourbon de Parme; born 17 October 2013, The Hague).
- Prince Carlos Enrique Leonard of Parma, The Prince of Piacenza (Dutch: Prins Carlos Enrique de Bourbon de Parme; born 24 April 2016, The Hague).

== Titles, styles, honours and arms ==
=== Honours ===
- (Duchy of Parma) House of Bourbon-Parma
  - Knight Grand Cross, Special Class of the Royal Order of Saint George
  - Knight Grand Cross, Special Class of the Royal Order of Saint Louis
  - Knight of the Royal Order of Prohibited Legitimacy
- Sovereign Military Order of Malta: Dame Grand Cross of the Order of Merit (04 October 2025)

Princess Annemarie, Hereditary Duchess of Parma House of Bourbon-Parma Cadet branch of the House of Bourbon Born: 18 December 1977
Titles in pretence
Vacant Title last held by Irene of the Netherlands	— TITULAR — Queen consort of Spain; Carlist; 18 August 2010 – present	Incumbent
