= House of Bourbon-Parma =

Cadet branch of the House of Bourbon-Anjou

- Parent house: Bourbon-Anjou (agnatic); Farnese (enatic)
- Country: Italy; Luxembourg; Netherlands Former countries: Duchy of Parma; Kingdom of Etruria; Duchy of Lucca
- Founded: 18 October 1748; 278 years ago
- Founder: Philip, Duke of Parma
- Current head: Prince Carlos
- Final ruler: Guastalla: Ferdinand I (1765–1802); Etruria: Louis II (1803–1807); Lucca: Charles I (1824–1847); Parma: Robert I (1854–1859)
- Titles: Current: Grand Duke of Luxembourg; Prince of Bourbon de Parme; Former: King of Etruria; King of Northern Lusitania (Note: According to the Convention of Fontainebleau.); Duke of Parma; Duke of Piacenza; Duke of Guastalla; Duke of Lucca
- Deposition: Etruria: December 10, 1807; 218 years ago (annexed by French Empire); Parma: June 9, 1859; 167 years ago (annexed by Sardinia)
- Cadet branches: Luxembourg-Nassau

The House of Bourbon-Parma (Italian: Casa di Borbone di Parma) is a cadet branch of the House of Bourbon, whose members once ruled as King of Etruria and as Duke of Parma and Piacenza, Guastalla, and Lucca. The House descended from the French Capetian dynasty in male line. Its name of Bourbon-Parma comes from the main name (Bourbon) and the other (Parma) from the title of Duke of Parma. The title was held by the Bourbons, as the founder Philip, Duke of Parma who was the great-grandson of Ranuccio II Farnese, Duke of Parma, married Louise Élisabeth of France, getting the house of Bourbon, and the state of Parma, together. The House of Bourbon-Parma is today the Sovereign House of the Grand Duchy of Luxembourg (agnatically) and all members of the Grand Ducal Family of Luxembourg are members of the House of Bourbon-Parma with the title of "Princes/Princesses" and the predicate of Royal Highness.

Great coat of arms of the House of Bourbon-Parma

== Duchy of Parma ==
The Duchy of Parma was created in 1545 from that part of the Duchy of Milan south of the Po River, as a fief for Pope Paul III's illegitimate son, Pier Luigi Farnese, centered on the city of Parma. In 1556, the second Duke, Ottavio Farnese, was given the city of Piacenza, becoming thus also Duke of Piacenza, and so the state was thereafter properly known as the Duchies of Parma and Piacenza.

The House of Farnese continued to rule the duchies until 1731 and the death of the last male-line duke, Antonio. Upon his death the duchy passed to Infante Charles of Spain, the heir to the duchy through his mother, Elisabeth Farnese. However by the terms of the Treaty of Vienna (1738) Charles had to give up the duchy to Austria.

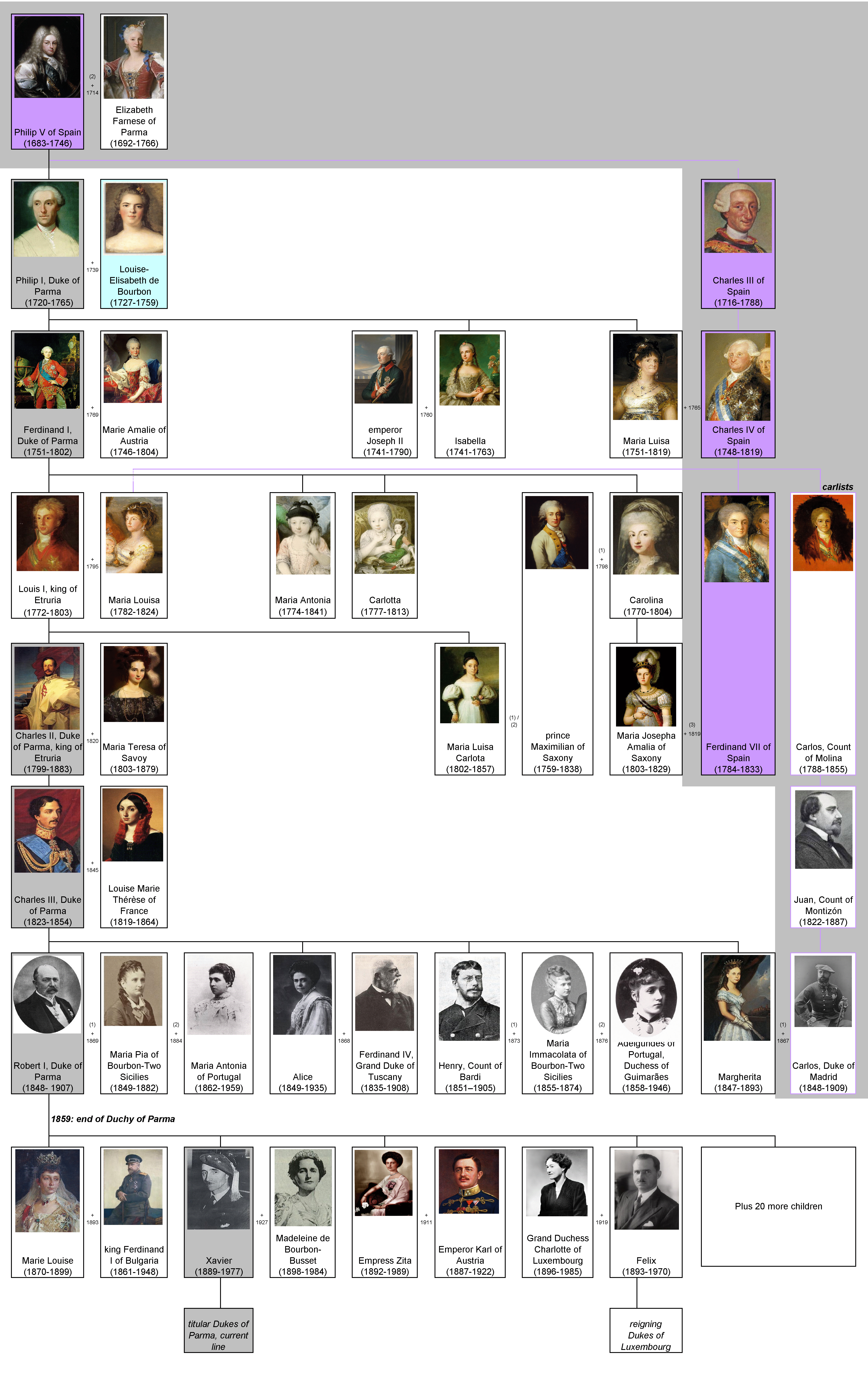
House of Bourbon-Parma in the 18th and 19th centuries

=== Temporary Habsburg rule ===
The Habsburgs only ruled until the conclusion of the Treaty of Aix-la-Chapelle in 1748, when it was ceded back to the Bourbons in the person of Philip of Spain, Charles's younger brother. As Duke Philip, he became the founder of the House of Bourbon-Parma.

In 1796, the duchy was occupied by French troops under Napoleon Bonaparte and absorbed into the Cisalpine Republic and Kingdom of Italy.

In 1814, the duchies were restored under Napoleon's Habsburg wife, Marie Louise, who was to rule them for her lifetime. The duchy was renamed the Duchy of Parma, Piacenza and Guastalla.

=== Return to the Bourbons ===
After Marie Louise's death in 1847, the duchy was restored to the Bourbon-Parma line, which had been ruling the tiny Duchy of Lucca. As part of the return, the Duchy of Guastalla was transferred to the Duchy of Modena. The Bourbons ruled until 1859, when they were driven out by a revolution following the Franco-Sardinian victory in their war against Austria.

The duchies of Parma, Piacenza and Guastalla and the Duchy of Lucca joined with the Grand Duchy of Tuscany and the Duchy of Modena to form the United Provinces of Central Italy in December 1859, and were annexed to the Kingdom of Sardinia in March 1860. The House of Bourbon continues to claim the title of Duke of Parma to this day. Carlos-Hugo (Carlist pretender to the Spanish throne in the 1970s) held the title from 1977 to his death. His son now claims the title.

=== List of dukes ===
==== House of Bourbon-Parma (1731–1735) ====
Duke	Portrait	Birth	Marriages	Death
Charles, Duke of Parma; 1731–1735	Charles	20 January 1716; Madrid son of Philip V of Spain and Elizabeth of Parma	Maria Amalia of Saxony; 1738; 13 children	14 December 1788; Madrid aged 72

==== House of Bourbon-Parma (1748–1802) ====
Duke	Portrait	Birth	Marriages	Death
Philip, Duke of Parma; 1748–1765		15 March 1720; Madrid son of Philip V of Spain and Elizabeth of Parma	Louise-Elisabeth de Bourbon; 25 October 1739; 3 children	18 July 1765; Alessandria aged 45
Ferdinand I, Duke of Parma; 1765–1802		20 January 1751; Parma son of Philip, Duke of Parma and Louise-Elisabeth de Bourbon	Archduchess Maria Amalia of Austria; 19 July 1769; 9 children	9 October 1802; Fontevivo aged 51

During the French ownership of the Duchy of Parma, the title of Duke of Parma was used as an honorary form and style. From 1808, the title was used by Jean Jacques Régis de Cambacérès. He kept the style of Duke of Parma until 1814. Only in 1847 was the actual title restored to the Bourbons, after a period of being held by Marie Louise of Austria, who was a Habsburg and the second wife of Napoleon I.

==== House of Bourbon-Parma (1847–1859) ====
Duke	Portrait	Birth	Marriages	Death
Charles II, Duke of Parma; 1847–1848		22 December 1799; Madrid son of Louis of Etruria and Maria Louisa, Duchess of Lucca	Maria Teresa of Savoy; 5 September 1820; 2 children	16 April 1883; Nice aged 84
Charles III, Duke of Parma; 1848–1854		14 January 1823; Lucca son of Charles II, Duke of Parma and Princess Maria Teresa of Savoy	Princess Louise Marie Thérèse of France; 10 November 1845; 4 children	27 March 1854; Parma aged 31
Robert I, Duke of Parma; 1854–1859		9 July 1848; Florence son of Charles III, Duke of Parma and Louise Marie Thérèse of Artois	Maria Pia of the Two Sicilies; 5 April 1869; 12 children Maria Antonia of Portugal; 15 October 1884; 12 children	16 November 1907; Viareggio aged 59

==== Titular dukes of Parma (since 1859) ====
Duke	Portrait	Birth	Marriages	Death
Robert, Duke of Parma; 1859–1907 titular		9 July 1848; Florence son of Charles III, Duke of Parma and Louise Marie Thérèse of Artois	Maria Pia of the Two Sicilies; 5 April 1869; 12 children Maria Antonia of Portugal; 15 October 1884; 12 children	16 November 1907; Viareggio aged 59
Henry, Duke of Parma; 1907–1939 titular		13 June 1873; Wartegg son of Robert I, Duke of Parma and Maria Pia of the Two Sicilies	never married	16 November 1939; Pianore aged 66
Joseph, Duke of Parma; 1939–1950 titular		30 June 1875; Biarritz son of Robert I, Duke of Parma and Maria Pia of the Two Sicilies	never married	7 January 1950; Pianore aged 75
Elias, Duke of Parma; 1950–1959 titular		23 July 1880; Biarritz son of Robert I, Duke of Parma and Maria Pia of the Two Sicilies	Maria Anna of Austria; 25 May 1903; Vienna; 8 children	27 June 1959; Friedberg aged 79
Robert II, Duke of Parma; 1959–1974 titular		7 August 1909; Weilburg son of Elias, Duke of Parma and Maria Anna of Austria	never married	25 November 1974; Vienna aged 65
Xavier, Duke of Parma; 1974–1977 titular		25 May 1889; Viareggio son of Robert I, Duke of Parma and Maria Antonia of Portugal	Madeleine de Bourbon-Busset; 12 November 1927; Lignières; 6 children	7 May 1977; Zizers aged 87
Carlos Hugo, Duke of Parma; 1977–2010 titular		8 April 1930; Paris son of Xavier, Duke of Parma and Madeleine de Bourbon-Busset	Princess Irene of the Netherlands; 29 April 1964; Rome; 4 children	18 August 2010; Barcelona aged 80
Carlos, Duke of Parma since 2010 titular		27 January 1970; Nijmegen son of Carlos Hugo, Duke of Parma and Princess Irene of the Netherlands	Annemarie Gualthérie van Weezel; 20 November 2010; Brussels; 3 children	incumbent

== See also ==
- Descendants of Louis XIV of France
- Duke of Parma
- Order of Prohibited Legitimacy
- History of the Duchy of Parma and Piacenza
