= Princess Maria Pia of the Two Sicilies =

Titular Duchess of Parma (1849–1882)

Maria Pia of the Two Sicilies
- Duchess of Parma
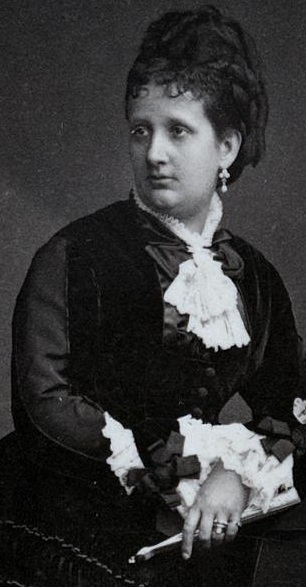
- Photograph of Maria Pia, c. 1880
- Born: 2 August 1849; Gaeta, Two Sicilies
- Died: 29 September 1882 (aged 33); Biarritz, France
- Burial: Villa Borbone near Viareggio
- Spouse: Robert I, Duke of Parma (m. 1869)
- Issue: Marie Louise, Princess of Bulgaria; Ferdinand, Prince of Piacenza; Princess Luisa Maria; Henry, Duke of Parma; Princess Maria Immacolata; Joseph, Duke of Parma; Princess Maria Teresa; Princess Maria Pia; Beatrice, Countess Lucchesi-Palli; Elias, Duke of Parma; Princess Maria Anastasia; Prince Augusto
Names
- Maria Pia della Grazia di Borbone
- House: Bourbons of the Two Sicilies
- Father: Ferdinand II of the Two Sicilies
- Mother: Maria Theresa of Austria

Maria Pia of the Two Sicilies (2 August 1849 – 29 September 1882) was a Princess of the Two Sicilies and titular Duchess consort of Parma as the wife of Robert I, Duke of Parma. She was the daughter of King Ferdinand II of the Two Sicilies and Maria Theresa of Austria. Maria Pia was forced into exile along with the rest of her family following the unification of Italy in 1861.

== Marriage and issue ==
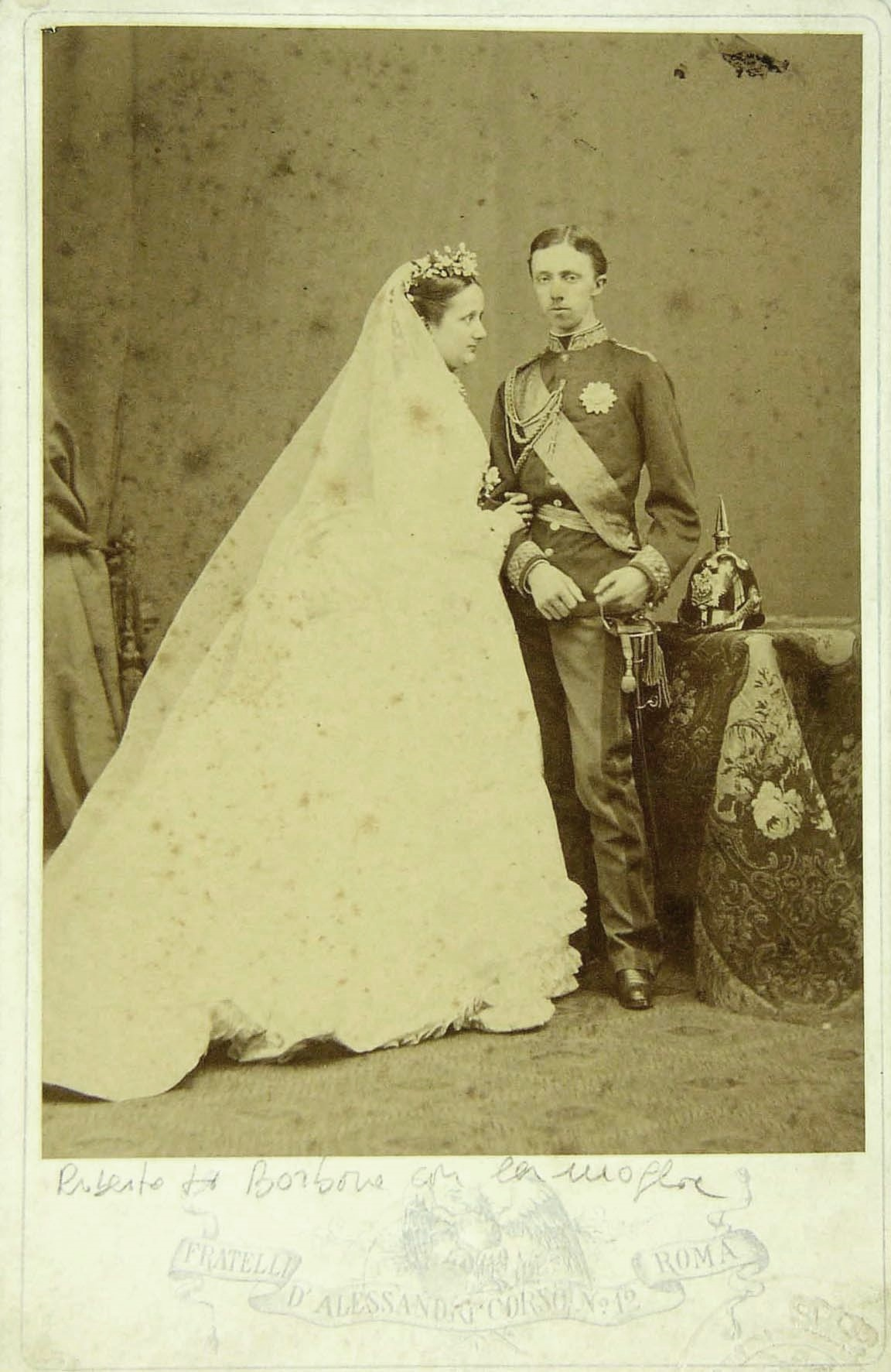
Robert and Pia at their wedding in 1869

Maria Pia married Robert I, the exiled Duke of Parma and Piacenza and son of Charles III, Duke of Parma and his wife Princess Louise Marie Thérèse of France, on 5 April 1869 in Rome. Maria Pia and Robert, who were half first cousins once removed, had twelve children, of whom six were mentally disabled:

1. Princess Marie Louise of Parma (17 January 1870 – 31 January 1899) she married Ferdinand I of Bulgaria on 20 April 1893. They had four children.
2. Prince Ferdinando of Parma (5 March 1871 – 14 April 1871)
3. Princess Luisa Maria of Parma (24 March 1872 – 22 June 1943) she was mentally disabled.
4. Henry, Duke of Parma (13 June 1873 – 16 November 1939) he was mentally disabled
5. Princess Maria Immacolata of Parma (21 July 1874 – 16 May 1914) she was mentally disabled.
6. Joseph, Duke of Parma (30 June 1875 – 7 January 1950) he was also mentally disabled
7. Princess Maria Teresa of Parma (15 October 1876 – 25 January 1959) she was mentally disabled.
8. Princess Maria Pia of Parma (9 October 1877 – 29 January 1915) she was mentally disabled.
9. Princess Beatrice of Parma (9 January 1879 – 11 March 1946) she married Count Pietro Lucchesi-Palli (grandson of from second marriage of Princess Caroline of Naples and Sicily) on 12 August 1906. They had three sons:
  - Count Antonio Lucchesi-Palli (1 June 1907 – 4 January 1911)
  - Count Roberto Lucchesi-Palli (7 May 1908 – 9 June 1983) he married Stefania Ruffo di Calabria on 7 June 1941. They have four sons.
  - Count Adinolfo Lucchesi-Palli (18 June 1911— 26 February 1986) he married Sarolta Teleki Gräfin von Szek on 2 June 1946. They have six children.
10. Elias, Duke of Parma (23 July 1880 – 27 June 1959) he married Archduchess Maria Anna of Austria on 25 May 1903. They had eight children.
11. Princess Maria Anastasia of Parma (25 August 1881 — 7 September 1881) Died in infancy.
12. Prince Augusto of Parma (22 September 1882 – 22 September 1882) stillborn child

== Later life ==
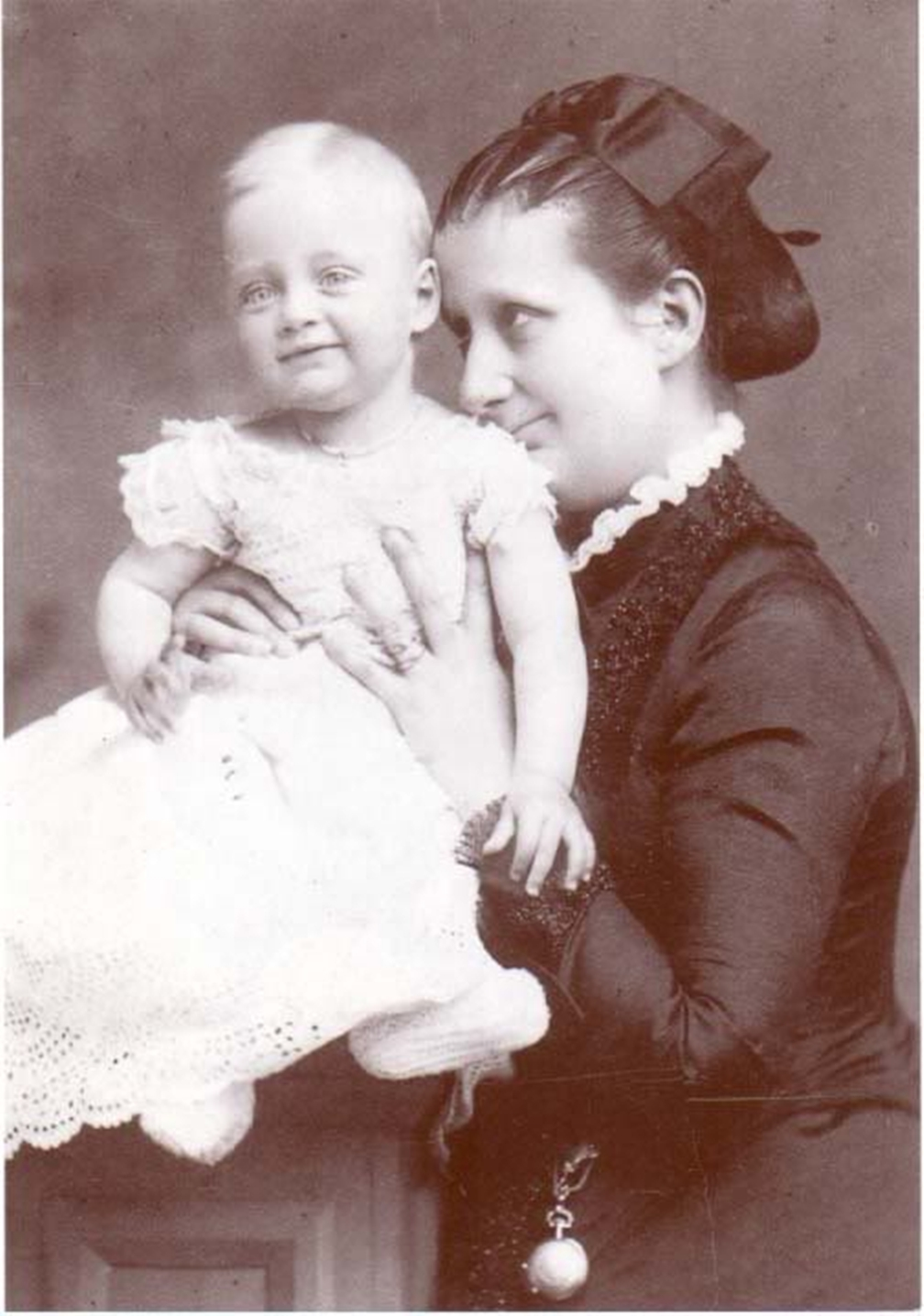
Duchess Maria Pia with her son Prince Elias

Maria Pia died as a result of childbirth and was buried at Villa Borbone near Viareggio. After her death, Robert I remarried in 1884 to Maria Antonia of Portugal, daughter of the deposed Miguel I of Portugal and Adelaide of Löwenstein-Wertheim-Rosenberg; they had twelve children.

== Ancestry ==
Ancestors of Princess Maria Pia of the Two Sicilies

8. Ferdinand I of the Two Sicilies
4. Francis I of the Two Sicilies
9. Archduchess Maria Carolina of Austria
2. Ferdinand II of the Two Sicilies
10. Charles IV of Spain
5. Infanta Maria Isabella of Spain
11. Princess Maria Luisa of Parma
1. Princess Maria Pia of Bourbon-Two Sicilies
12. Leopold II, Holy Roman Emperor
6. Archduke Charles, Duke of Teschen
13. Infanta Maria Louisa of Spain
3. Archduchess Maria Theresa of Austria
14. Frederick William, Prince of Nassau-Weilburg
7. Princess Henrietta of Nassau-Weilburg
15. Burgravine Louise Isabelle of Kirchberg
