= Mönichkirchen =

- Municipality
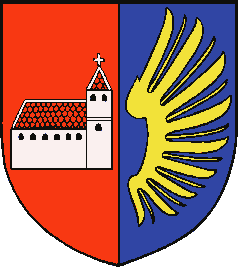
- Coat of arms

- Location within Austria
- Coordinates: 47°30′N 16°2′E
- Country: Austria
- State: Lower Austria
- District: Neunkirchen

Government
  - Mayor: Andreas Graf

Area
  - Total: 16.31 km^{2} (6.30 sq mi)
- Elevation: 967 m (3,173 ft)

Population (2018-01-01)
  - Total: 606
  - Density: 37.2/km^{2} (96.2/sq mi)
- Time zone: UTC+1 (CET)
  - Summer (DST): UTC+2 (CEST)
- Postal code: 2872
- Area code: 02649
- Website: www.moenichkirchen.at

Mönichkirchen is a market town in the district of Neunkirchen in the south of the Austrian state of Lower Austria with a population of 607 inhabitants (1.1.2013).

== Geography ==
Mönichkirchen is situated on the east side of the Wechsel mountain (1,743 m) in the south-east Industrieviertel near the border with Styria. The size of the village is 16.27 km². 68.34% of the area is forested.

== Population ==
Historical population
Year	Pop.	±%
1869	479	—
1880	546	+14.0%
1890	540	−1.1%
1900	526	−2.6%
1910	615	+16.9%
1923	579	−5.9%
1934	662	+14.3%
1939	646	−2.4%
1951	669	+3.6%
1961	752	+12.4%
1971	782	+4.0%
1981	741	−5.2%
1991	721	−2.7%
2001	623	−13.6%
2011	597	−4.2%

== Sports ==
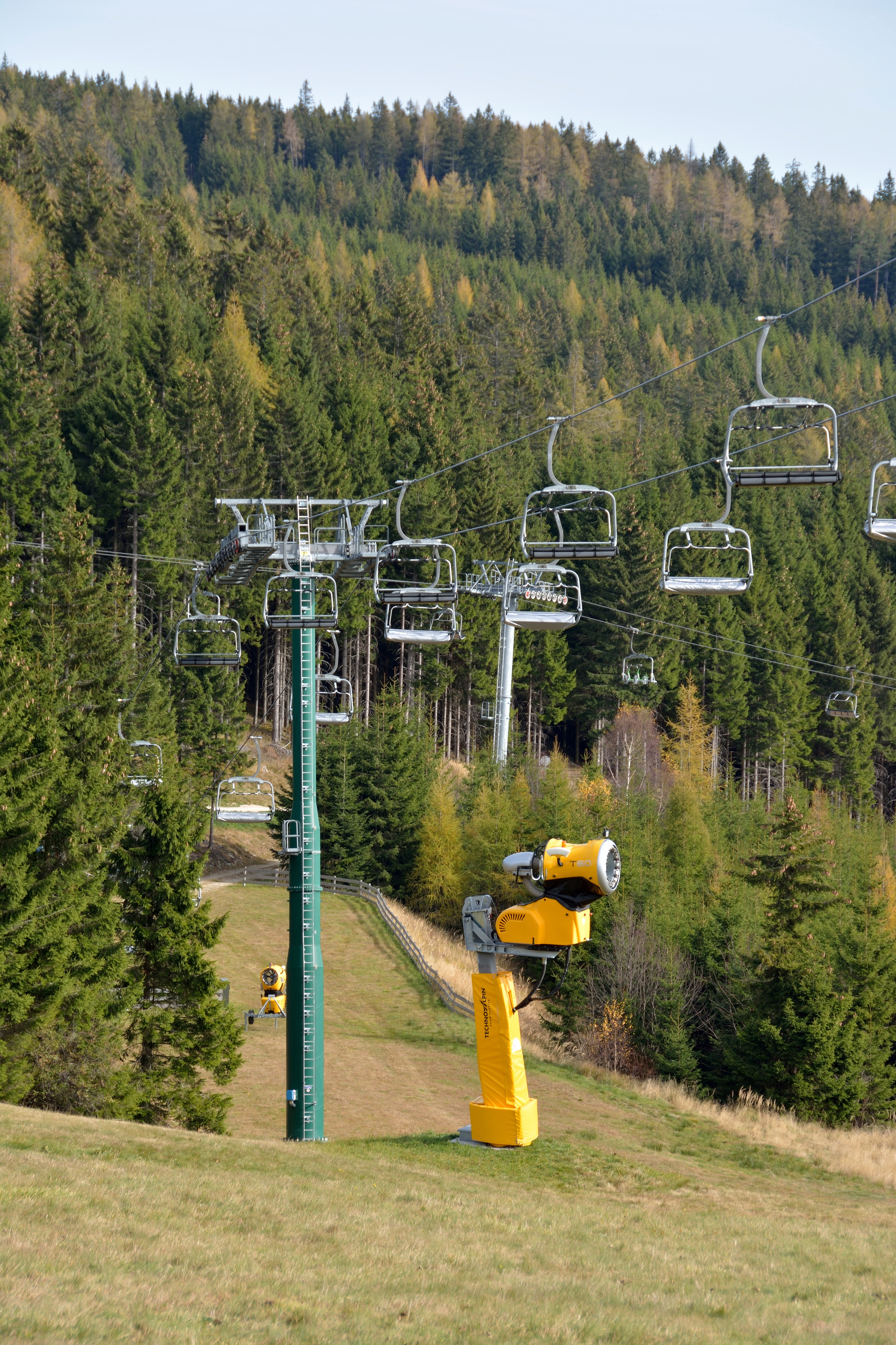
Skiing and hiking resort around Mönichkirchen

There are two sports clubs in Mönichkirchen:

- Winter sports club Mönichkirchen
- Soccer club FC Mönichkirchen

Around the village of Mönichkirchen there is a skiing resort that is joined by several lifts to the adjacent skiing resort of Mariensee (village of Aspangberg-Sankt Peter). The total length of ski-slopes of both resorts is about 13 km. Both villages operate three chair lifts and one drag lift.
During summer the region is commonly used for hiking and climbing.
