= Friedberg, Styria =

Friedberg
- Municipality
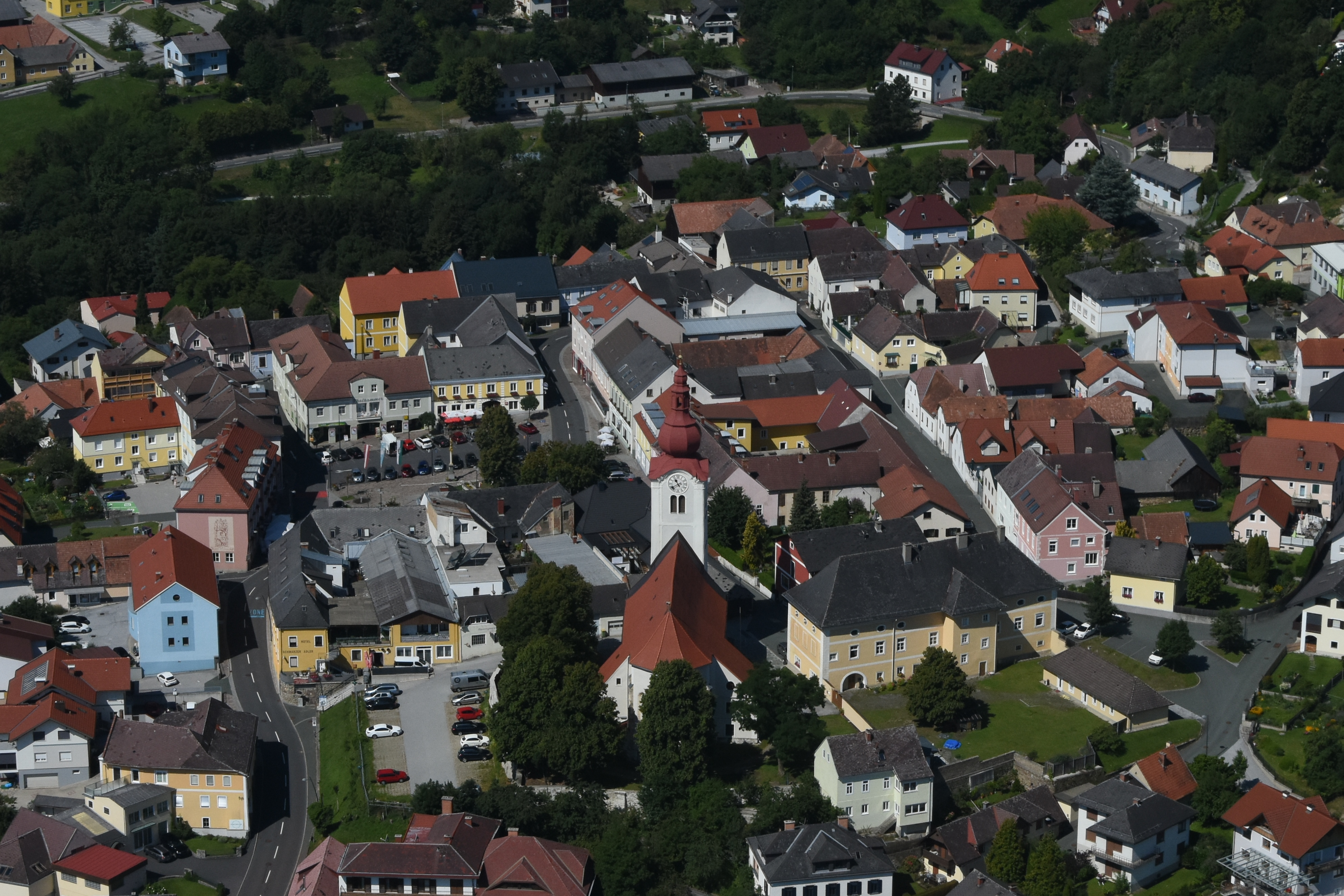
- Aerial view

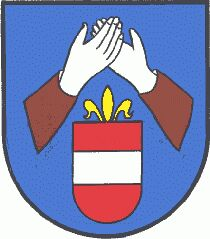
- Coat of arms

- Location within Austria
- Coordinates: 47°26′29″N 16°03′29″E
- Country: Austria
- State: Styria
- District: Hartberg-Fürstenfeld

Government
  - Mayor: Karl Mathä (ÖVP)

Area
  - Total: 25.88 km^{2} (9.99 sq mi)
- Elevation: 600 m (2,000 ft)

Population (2018-01-01)
  - Total: 2,601
  - Density: 100.5/km^{2} (260.3/sq mi)
- Time zone: UTC+1 (CET)
  - Summer (DST): UTC+2 (CEST)
- Postal code: 8240
- Area code: 03339
- Vehicle registration: HB
- Website: www.friedberg.at

Friedberg (Austrian German pronunciation: [ˈfʁiːdbɛrɡ]) is a town in the district of Hartberg-Fürstenfeld located in Styria, Austria with 2,562 inhabitants.

== Economy and infrastructure ==
The train station in Friedberg offers destinations to Wiener Neustadt, Vienna, Hartberg and Fehring. In Friedberg 3 train lines cross: the Thermenbahn, the Wechselbahn and the Pinkatalbahn.
