= Margaret of Denmark =

Margaret of Denmark, Margaretha of Denmark, Margrete of Denmark, or Margrethe of Denmark may refer to:

- Margaret Fredkulla (1080s – 1130), queen consort of Niels of Denmark
- Dagmar of Bohemia (c. 1186 – 1212), first queen consort of Valdemar II of Denmark and also known as Margaret
- Margaret Sambiria (c. 1230 – 1282), queen consort of Christopher I of Denmark and regent of Eric V of Denmark
- Martha of Denmark (1277 to 1280/1282 – 1341), second daughter of Eric V of Denmark and queen consort of Birger, King of Sweden, named Margrete at birth
- Margaret I of Denmark (1353–1412; r. 1387–1412), Queen of Denmark
- Margaret of Denmark, Queen of Scotland (1456–1486), only daughter of Christian I of Denmark and queen consort of James III of Scotland
- Princess Margaret of Denmark (1895–1992), granddaughter of Christian IX
- Princess Margaretha of Sweden (1899–1977), Danish princess by marriage to Prince Axel
- Margrethe II (born 1940; r. 1972–2024), Queen of Denmark

== See also ==
- Princess Margaret (disambiguation)
- Queen Margaret (disambiguation)
