= Austria–France relations =

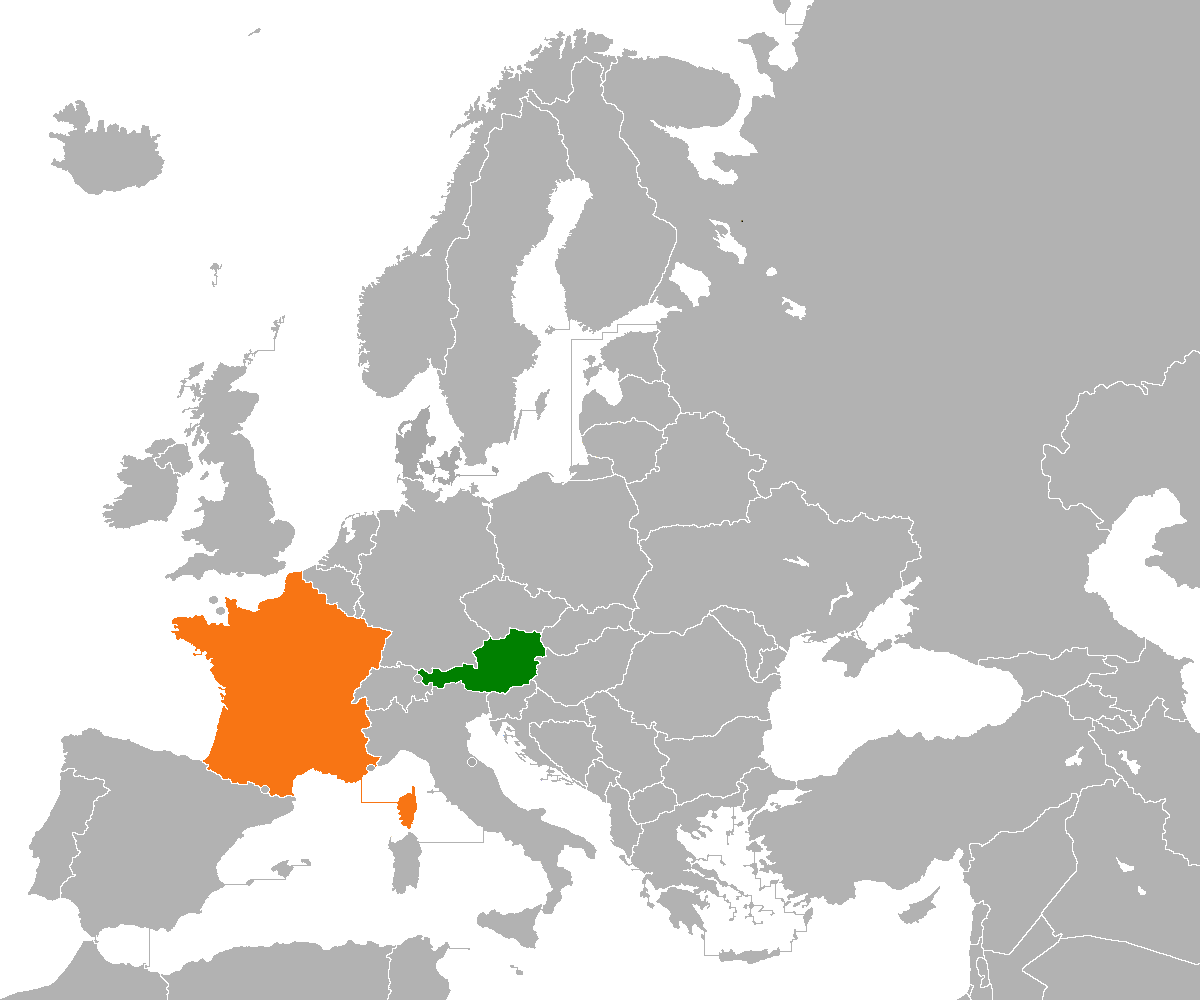
- Austria: France

Diplomatic mission
- Embassy of Austria, Paris: Embassy of France, Vienna

Austria and France have had diplomatic relations with each other since the Middle Ages. Both countries are full members of the Council of Europe and the European Union.

== History ==
=== Relations of France with the Habsburg Monarchy before 1804 ===
==== The conflict for supremacy in Europe between Habsburg and France ====
Since the second half of the 14th century, the Burgundian state had begun to form on the soil of the old Lotharingia on both sides of the French-German language border. This state was composed of various lands that were neither economically nor culturally unified and rose to become a major European power in the 15th century. The new state was called "the Great Duchy of the West" because it surpassed most of the monarchies of Europe in power and wealth. What this state lacked, however, was a royal crown. However, this was to change under the last duke, Charles the Bold. For he intended to enter into a Burgundian-Habsburg union, by which he hoped to elevate the state structure to kingship.

When Charles the Bold fell in the Battle of Nancy in January 1477, leaving no male heir, the autonomy of the Burgundian duchy ended. Charles the Bold had previously made a promise that his daughter Mary of Burgundy would be married to Maximilian I, the son of Emperor Frederick III, which occurred that same year. With this marriage, however, a conflict was to break out that had lasted for centuries between France and the Habsburgs.

Maximilian I asserted claims to the Burgundian inheritance on behalf of Charles's heiress Mary of Burgundy, as did the French king Louis XI of the House of Valois, from which the dukes of Burgundy descended. Burgundian wars of succession followed. Finally, in 1493, the Peace of Senlis was concluded with King Charles VIII of France. Maximilian retained most of the Burgundian territories on the territory of the Holy Roman Empire, except for the French fiefdom.

The marriage of Maximilian I and Mary of Burgundy gave birth in 1478 to Philip I the Fair, whose birth was of great importance for the consolidation of Habsburg rule in Burgundy. In 1496, as part of Maximilian I's marriage plans, Philip I was married to Joan, the daughter of the "Catholic monarchs" Isabella of Castile and Ferdinand II of Aragon, who stood at the cradle of the nascent Spanish Empire. In addition to the territories on the Iberian Peninsula, the Spanish Empire also extended to southern Italian territories (Sardinia, Naples and Sicily) and to the recently discovered overseas colonies in the Americas. The political background for these dynastic overtures was an alliance against France. This exacerbated the Habsburg-French rivalry anew.

Due to sudden deaths, Joan was the sole heir to the united crowns of Spain, which meant that Philip I was now in a similar situation in Spain as his father had been in Burgundy: he was the prince consort of the heir's daughter. Both of their sons, in turn, the future Emperor Charles V, assumed rule in Burgundian Flanders in 1515 and in the Kingdom of Spain the following year. He thus combined several crowns and even more claims, which served as a foundation for the attempt to establish a dynastic universal monarchy with Habsburg hegemony over Europe. France found itself encircled: To the south lay the Iberian heartland of the rising great power Spain. To the north and east along France's border with the Holy Roman Empire was the agglomeration of territories that had come under Habsburg rule as Burgundian inheritance.

The French crown's effort to break free from the threatening grip of the Habsburg possessions in order to eliminate the House of Habsburg as a competitor for supremacy in Europe resulted in a conflict between the Habsburgs and France that lasted for 240 years: the Habsburg-French antagonism. This extended from the Italian Wars (1494-1559), through the Thirty Years' War (1618-1648), to the War of the Spanish Succession (1701-1714), and ended in the treaties of Utrecht in 1713, Rastatt, and Baden in 1714. The peace treaties provided a breakthrough for a European system based on the balance of power.

==== Reversal of alliances (diplomatic revolution) ====
The Habsburg monarchy sought an alliance with France due to their growing concern over the rise of Prussia as a major power. France, in turn, wanted to challenge Britain's dominance both in Europe and its colonies. This led to the Convention of Westminster in 1756 between Britain and Prussia, prompting France to seek closer ties with the Habsburg monarchy. The resulting alliance, known as diplomatic Revolution, marked a significant shift in the European balance of power. The Seven Years' War began in February of that year, with France attacking the British Isles and Menorca, sparking a wider conflict for control of Europe. The first Treaty of Versailles, established in May 1756, was initially presented as a defensive alliance but was effectively an offensive one against Prussia. Russia also joined the alliance in 1759. The treaty included provisions for mutual military assistance, excluding conflicts between France and Britain. A second Habsburg-Bourbon treaty was signed in 1757, further solidifying the alliance. The Seven Years' War ended in 1763 and confirmed the status quo. Silesia and Glatz remained in Prussian possession and the Austrian hereditary lands continued to belong to Austria.

In 1770, diplomatic relations between France and Austria were strengthened with the marriage of Maria Antonia (Marie Antoinette), daughter of Maria Theresa, and the future King of France Louis XVI, a grandson of Louis XV, symbolically ending the Habsburg-French conflict that had lasted for almost 300 years.

==== French Revolution ====
Emperor Leopold II was initially positive about the French Revolution, but in 1791 his sister Marie-Antoinette already asked him to intervene militarily and put an end to the revolution. However, the emperor refused to do so. On June 20 and 21, 1791, the royal family attempted to flee France, but were intercepted at Varennes and taken back to Paris. On September 3 of that year, the constitutional monarchy was proclaimed. Emperor Leopold II and Prussian King Frederick William II promised to crush the French Revolution. As a result, France declared war, which met with great approval among the population. Through the cannonade of Valmy on September 20, 1792, the revolutionary army was able to ward off a military threat from the outside for the time being. However, with the execution of Louis XVI and his wife Marie-Antoinette in 1793, other monarchies such as Britain joined the war against France.

=== Relations between 1804 and 1918 ===
==== First and Second Coalition War ====
With the Pillnitz Declaration in 1791, Austria and Prussia had joined forces to support King Louis XVI during the French Revolution. This alliance was extended by other European powers in the 18th century and together they tried to contain the effects of the French Revolution.

France's declaration of war on April 20, 1792, finally marked the beginning of the War of the First Coalition, which ended on October 17, 1797, with the Peace of Campo Formio between France and Austria. The Congress of Rastatt from 1797 to 1799 was supposed to discuss the implementation of the peace resolutions, but it did not come to that, because the Napoleonic Wars began and thus the confrontation continued between France and Austria as well. On June 14, 1800, the Battle of Marengo took place, which brought Upper Italy back under French control and was a decisive victory over Austria. In the same year, the Battle of Hohenlinden took place, in which the French again defeated the Austrian army and thus were able to invade their lands. Austria was forced to sign a peace treaty, thus the Peace of Lunéville was signed, which secured for France the territories on the left bank of the Rhine and the recognition of the sister republics created by French revolutionary exports, as well as the Kingdom of Etruria.

==== Napoleonic wars ====
In December 1804, Napoleon Bonaparte declared himself Emperor of the French, prompting Emperor Francis II to proclaim himself Emperor Francis I of Austria. In 1805, Austria joined an alliance with Russia, Britain, and Sweden in the War of the Third Coalition against Napoleon. France demanded that Austria remove its troops from Tyrol and Veneto, but Emperor Francis I refused. Napoleon formed an alliance with Spain and southern German rulers and crossed the Rhine on September 25. France declared war on Austria after Austrian troops advanced into Bavaria. The French won the Battle of Elchingen and advanced to Vienna, where the famous Battle of Austerlitz took place. The Austrian and Russian troops were unable to withstand Napoleon's army and were forced to accept defeat. Napoleon established his headquarters at Austerlitz Castle, negotiated an armistice with Emperor Francis I, and the withdrawal of Russian troops. The War of the Third Coalition ended in 1805 with the Peace of Pressburg, resulting in significant territorial losses for Austria.

After several victories in battles such as Abensberg and Regensburg, Napoleon's army reached Vienna in May 1809. The Battle of Aspern, east of Vienna, resulted in the Austrians achieving their first victory over Napoleon. However, Napoleon went on to win subsequent battles against Austria, resulting in an armistice in Znojmo and the signing of the Peace of Schönbrunn in October 1809. This peace treaty led to further territorial losses for Austria and ultimately contributed to the state bankruptcy. To consolidate their political situation, Emperor Francis II's daughter, Archduchess Marie Louise, was married to Napoleon in 1810. This alliance forced Austria to participate in the Russian campaign in 1812. In 1813, Austria joined Prussia in a renewed effort to end French domination under Napoleon. This alliance, along with Russia, managed to defeat Napoleon at the Battle of Leipzig.

On March 31, 1814, the allied troops take Paris and Napoleon is forced to abdicate. He is replaced by the Treaty of Fontainebleau, concluded by Austria, Russia, Prussia and himself, which banished him to the island of Elba and granted Empress Marie-Louise the Italian duchies of Parma, Piacenza and Guastalla with full autonomy. In September of that year until June 9, 1815, the Congress of Vienna took place under the leadership of the Austrian Foreign Minister Prince von Metternich, whose goal was the reorganization of Europe after the defeat of Napoleon, and with which Austria was able to get back many territories lost to France.

==== Rhine crisis of 1840 ====
The Rhine Crisis was a pivotal moment in the history of the Austrian Empire and German nationalism. It began with French imperialism, aiming to expand its influence in the Orient. France supported Mehmet Ali, Egypt’s pasha, whose ambition to seek hereditary rule in Egypt, Levant, and Syria challenged Ottoman suzerainty. The crisis was a diplomatic dispute over natural borders, with France claiming the Rhine as its eastern border. The Austrian Empire, along with the United Kingdom, the Kingdom of Prussia, and the Russian Empire, signed the Convention of London with the Ottoman Empire, which culminated failure of the French-backed strategy projecting on Mediterranean. This treaty, without France's consultation, marked a significant diplomatic setback for France and the growing revival nationalism and resistance against French influence in the region.

==== Revolutions of 1848 ====
In February 1848, the bourgeois-democratic revolution ended in France and the Second French Republic was proclaimed. The spirit of the revolution also made itself felt in Austria, so that a failed revolution occurred in the same year, but it was unsuccessful, as neo-absolutism continued thereafter.

In the field of foreign policy, Austria was threatened by some dangers. The relationship with Prussia was strained, there were economic antagonisms with England, and Russia saw Austria as an enemy because the latter did not support Russia in the Crimean War. France, under Napoleon III, was willing to risk war with Austria in order to secure parts of northern Italy in Lombardo-Venetia. Treaty of Villafranca was signed, which resulted in Austria ceding Lombardy to France. The Venetian question became a significant issue in the years following the Plombières Agreement. Austria retained control over Venetia despite losing Lombardy to France, which was later ceded to Sardinia-Piedmont. The ongoing diplomatic tensions and the desire to resolve the Venetian question were pivotal in the negotiations between Austria and France.

Austria's diplomatic strategy aimed to isolate Prussia and manage its losses to France. Preempt Prussia from gaining influence in northern Italy during the conflict and limit Sardinian-Piedmontese (Savoyard) expansion while securing a more controlled territorial resolution through France as an intermediary agent.

==== Franco-Prussian War ====
The Franco-Prussian War of 1870, in which the southern German states also sided with Prussia, led to the creation of the German Empire through a swift and unequivocal victory and the proclamation of Wilhelm I as German Emperor in 1871. After the defeat for France, Emperor Napoleon III was deposed and made way for the Third Republic.

==== Alliance politics in Europe ====
After the 1870s, the alliance policy led to a constellation in which two hostile blocs faced each other. There were many problems between the European states, which made the war readiness very high. In 1878, the Habsburg Monarchy and the German Empire concluded the Dual Alliance. This expanded to include Italy in 1882 and Romania in 1883. However, the interaction of these was conflictual due to numerous tensions between the two new allies and the Danube Monarchy. The opposing alliance was formed from 1894 by the alliance between France and Russia, followed by the alliance between France and Britain in 1904. Finally, Russia and Britain also concluded an alliance in 1907. These three allies would become partners in World War I as the Entente Cordiale.

==== World War I ====
Following the assassination of Archduke Franz Ferdinand in Sarajevo on June 28, 1914, and the resulting July crisis, World War I began on July 28, 1914, with Austria-Hungary's declaration of war on Serbia. Germany supported the Austrian ally in its strict stance against Serbia. Serbia, in turn, was supported by Russia. Disaster struck when, in the aftermath of Austria's declaration of war against Serbia, Germany declared war on Russia and France. Due to the invasion of German troops via neutral Belgium into France, Britain joined the war. Austro-Hungarian troops were deployed on the Western Front as military support for the German Empire in France and Belgium.

The Sixtus Affair was a failed secret attempt by Emperor Charles I of Austria to negotiate a separate peace with the Allies during World War I, using his brother-in-law Prince Sixtus of Bourbon-Parma as intermediary. Sixtus and his brother Xavier leveraged family ties and contacts in neutral Switzerland to relay Austria-Hungary's proposals to French President Raymond Poincaré and Prime Minister Aristide Briand, This however highlighted the limitations of Austria-Hungary’s independent diplomacy during World War I and exposed the empire’s dependence on Germany. It also illustrated the generational shift in leadership from Franz Joseph I to Charles I, who attempted more flexible and personal approaches to foreign policy. Ultimately, the affair was a diplomatic debacle that weakened the Habsburg Monarchy’s position and credibility both at home and abroad.

The allies of the Central Powers, Italy and Romania, remained neutral for the time being, but then entered the war on the side of the Entente. Turkey and Bulgaria joined the war on the side of the Central Powers. On November 3, 1918, an armistice was signed, marking the victory of the Triple-Entente coalition and the collapse of the Central Powers.

=== Relations between 1918 and 1945 ===
Relations between Austria and France in the interwar period were primarily influenced by the consequences of the First World War. The Peace Treaty of St. Germain, which came into force in 1920, also sealed the dissolution of Austria-Hungary and the end of the Habsburg monarchy. Tough conditions were imposed on the new state of Austria. In the negotiations of 1919, France was one of the main demanders of an independent Austria, which was to be prohibited from uniting with Germany. The main purpose of this was to prevent a resurgence of Germany after 1918. After the negative experiences of the First World War, a new large German power bloc should not to emerge under any circumstances. Therefore, all of France's diplomatic efforts in the interwar period were aimed at ensuring that Austria remained an independent state. At the same time France was also against a Habsburg restoration in Austria.

In addition to its political interests, France had considerable economic interests in Austria. France had large stakes in both banks and industry. By strengthening a federation on the Danube, France hoped to create a well-connected economic center under French influence, with a center in Vienna. To achieve this goal, the French Reparations Commission was transformed into an Aid and Reconstruction Commission. At the same time, however, French aid policy was always also power politics. During the crisis of the Austrian Creditanstalt in 1931, France was only willing to help if Austria abandoned its plans for a customs union with Germany. In the League of Nations bonds of 1923 and 1932, France pressed for Austria to recommit itself not to join Germany for at least 20 years.

After the elimination of the Austrian parliament in 1933, France tried in vain to force the return of democracy in Austria by not servicing aid payments. Although the Socialists were persecuted in Austria from 1934 and a Socialist government was in power in France at the same time, diplomatic relations with France were better during this period than before. The reason for this was that for the first time the Austrian government itself now had the goal of an independent Austria and was thus in line with France's wishes. This changed abruptly with the July Agreement of 1936 between Nazi Germany and Austria. Although the German Reich recognized Austria's independence in it, the French saw the agreement preparing the way for the later Anschluss.

After the Anschluss to the German Reich was completed on March 13, 1938, and Austria subsequently ceased to exist as an independent state, the governments of France and England each lodged protest notes. However, the French government had to accept the annexation on April 2, 1938. Diplomatic relations were now conducted through the central offices in Berlin until the outbreak of war, but France tried to remain in contact with Austrian officials, although from now on there were no official contacts in Austria. In Paris, Otto Habsburg campaigned for the restoration of the monarchy, which was also considered by the French side. After the Occupation of northern France 1941 some Germans and Austrians fled to the freer south of France.

=== After 1945 ===
After the Third Reich was defeated in May 1945, Germany and Austria were occupied by the Allies. At first, the USA and France did not want to take over an occupation zone in Austria. But after the USA agreed, the French also took over a part. They got North Tyrol and Vorarlberg, plus a quarter of Vienna. France wanted to prevent a renewed annexation to Germany at all costs and they advocated again for an independent Austria. France pursued this goal on three levels. First, they acted not as an occupying power but as a liberator and demanded reparations only to be able to finance their own troops in the country. The second aspect concerned cultural cooperation. France did not limit itself to the establishment and operation of cultural institutions, but also promoted local initiatives that otherwise would not have existed so quickly. The last point concerned influencing the future state treaty that was to come into being in 1955. With the treaty Austria got its sovereignty back and became a neutral country.

After 1955, Austria and France established problem-free and cooperative relations. In 1960 Austria became part of the European Free Trade Association and concluded a Free trade agreement with the European Economic Community (of which France was a part of) in 1973. After the end of the Cold War Austria became a member of the European Union in 1995. Numerous bilateral agreements have been concluded between Austria and France and citizens of both countries can freely visit each other.

== Resident diplomatic missions ==
- Austria has an embassy in Paris and a consulate-general in Strasbourg.
- France has an embassy in Vienna.
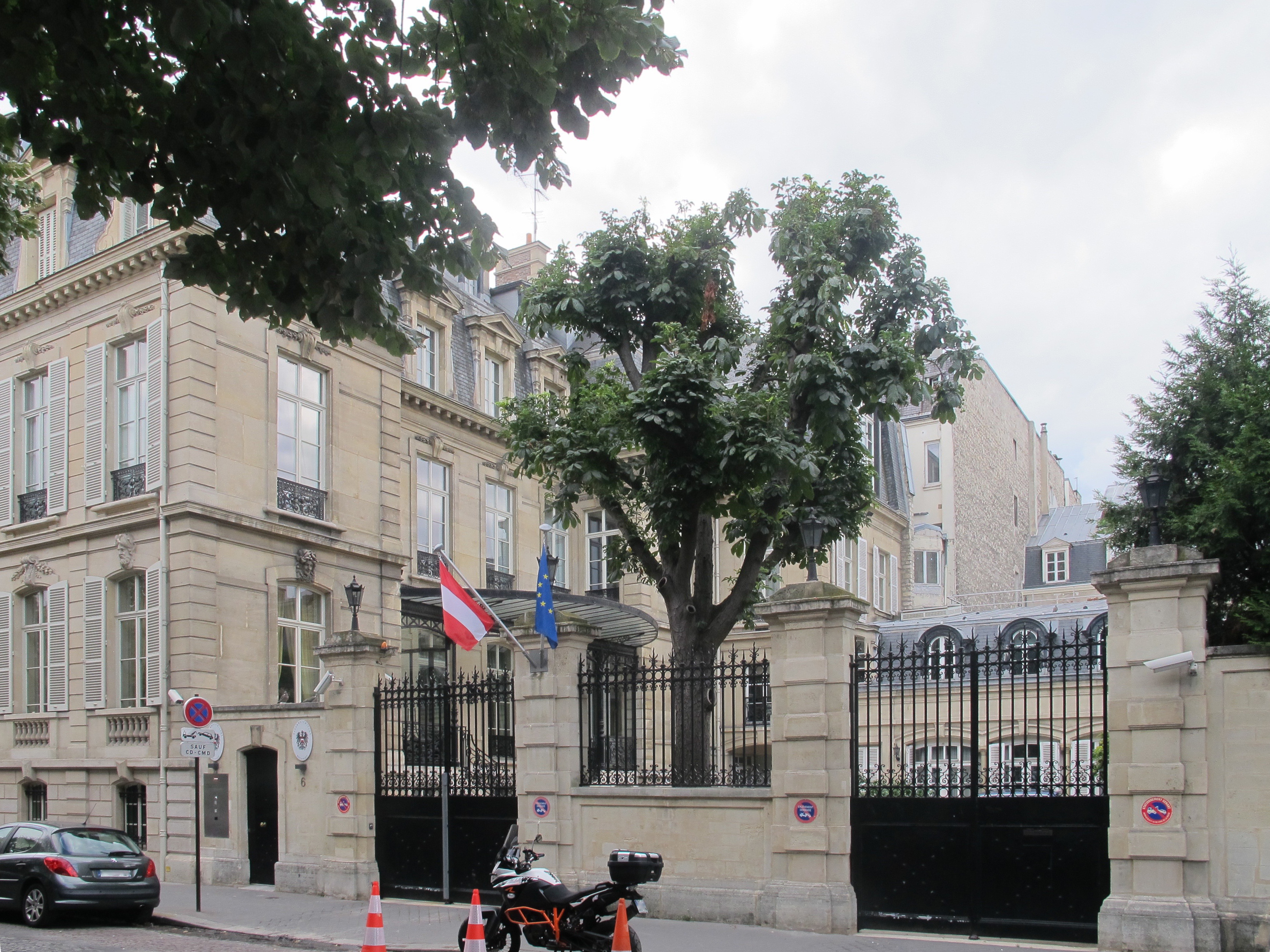
Embassy of Austria in Paris

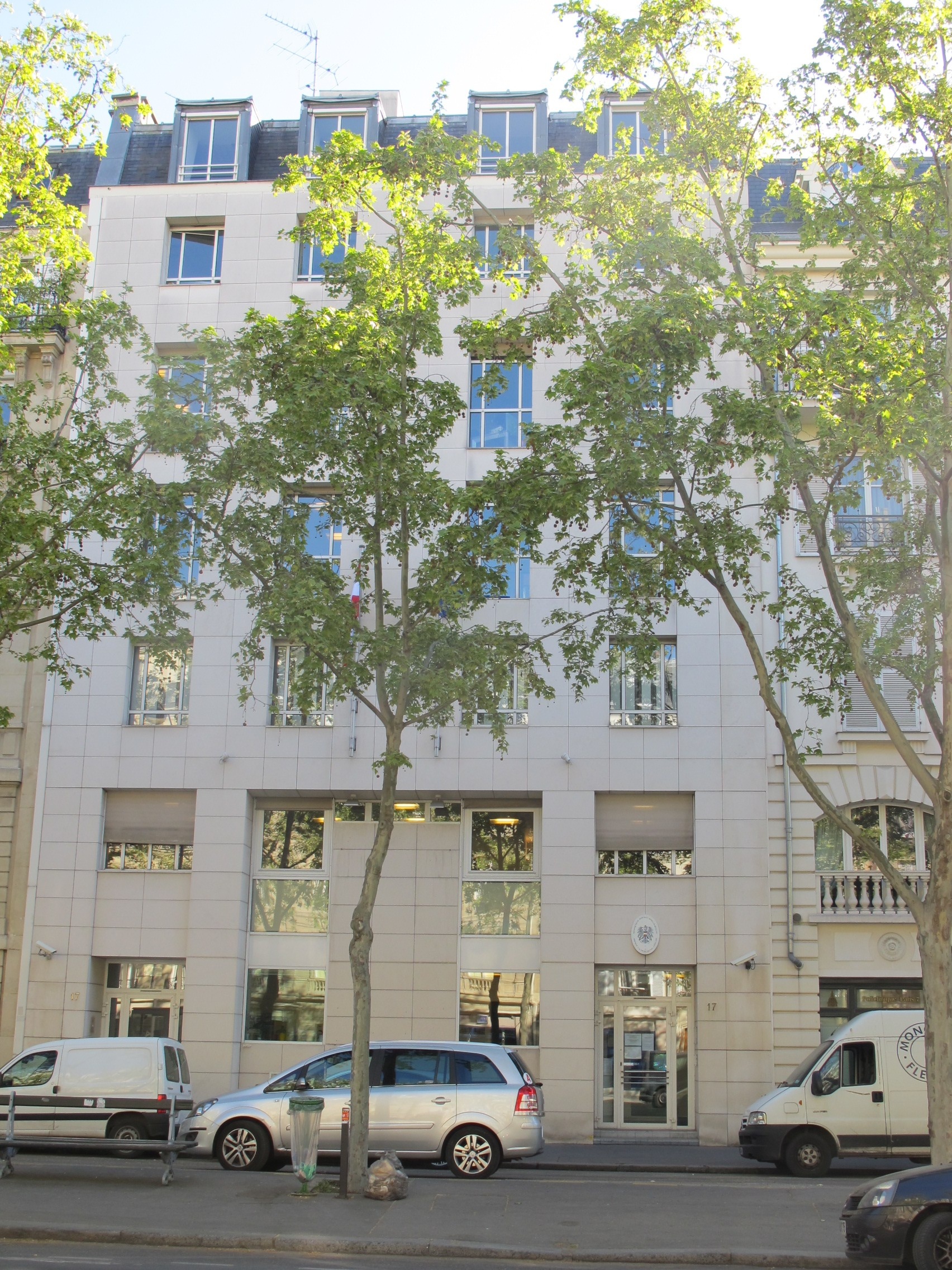
Consulate-General of Austria in Paris

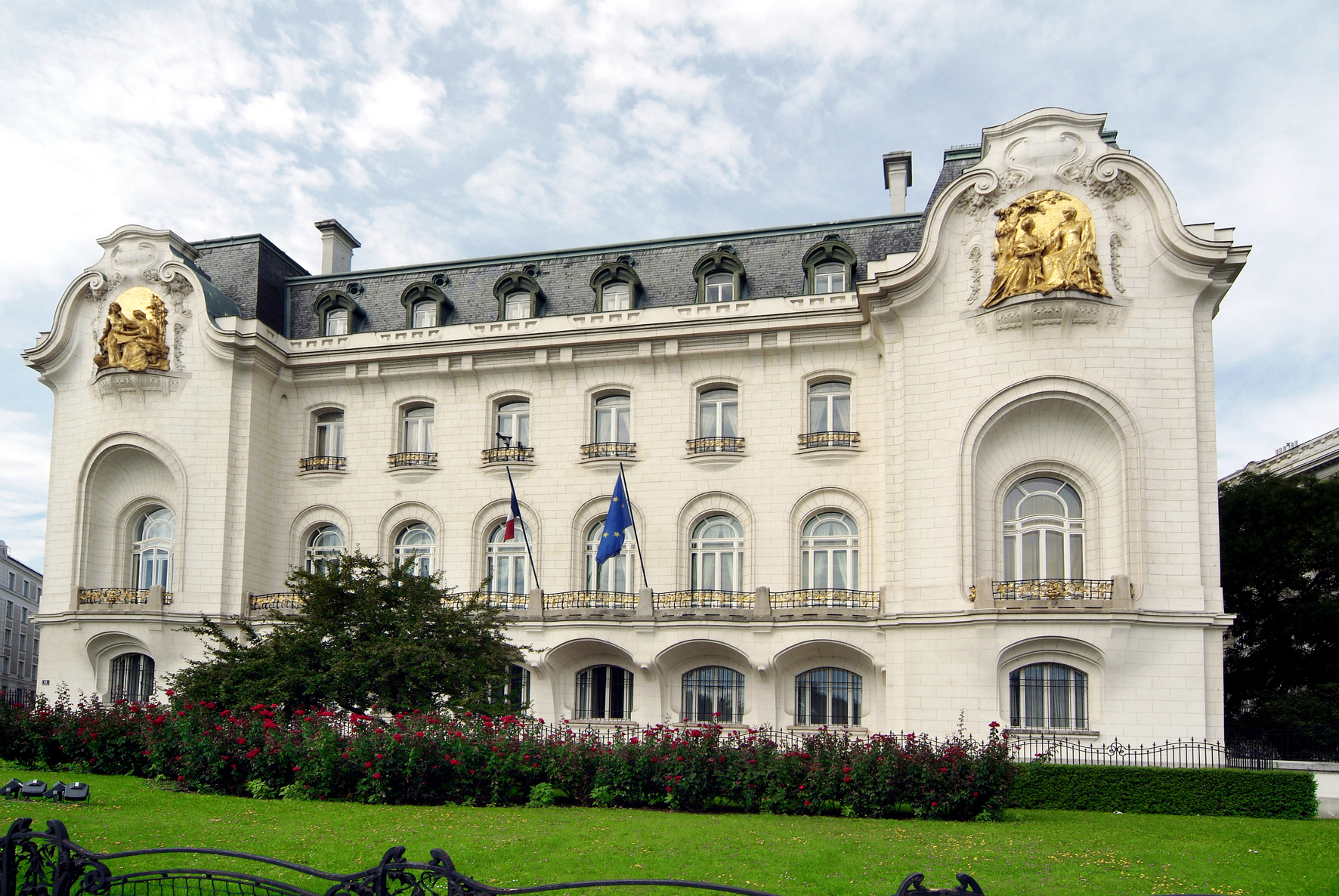
Embassy of France in Vienna

== See also ==
- Foreign relations of Austria
- Foreign relations of France
- List of Ambassadors of France to Austria
