= Empress Margaret =

Empress Margaret may refer to:

- Margaret of Hungary (Byzantine empress) (1175–?), wife of Isaac II Angelos
- Margaret II, Countess of Hainaut (1311–1356), wife of Louis IV, Holy Roman Emperor
- Margaret Theresa of Spain (1651–1673), wife of Leopold I, Holy Roman Emperor

== See also ==
- Margaret of Brabant (1276–1311), wife of Henry of Luxembourg, King of Germany, later Holy Roman Emperor (after her death)
- Queen Margaret (disambiguation)
