= Princess Meg =

Princess Meg may refer to:

- Princess Margaret, Countess of Snowdon (1930–2002), British princess, younger sister of Queen Elizabeth II
- Meghan, Duchess of Sussex (born 1981), American actress, married to Prince Harry, Duke of Sussex
- Megumi Kurihara (born 1984), Japanese volleyball player
- 'Meg' Tudor, a character in The Spanish Princess
- Meg, a character in Disney's Hercules

== See also ==
- Princess Margaret (disambiguation)
