= Prince Gaetano of Bourbon-Parma =

Son of Robert I, Duke of Parma

Prince Gaetan of Bourbon-Parma
- Gaetano in the 1930s
- Born: 11 June 1905; Villa Pianore, Lucca, Italy
- Died: 9 March 1958 (aged 52); Mandelieu-la-Napoule, France
- Spouse: Princess Margarete of Thurn and Taxis (m. 1931)
- Issue: Princess Diana
Names
- Gaetano Maria Giuseppe Pio
- Father: Robert I, Duke of Parma
- Mother: Infanta Maria Antonia of Portugal

Prince Gaetano of Bourbon-Parma (11 June 1905 – 9 March 1958) was the youngest son of Robert I, the last reigning Duke of Parma and of his second wife Maria Antonia of Portugal. A prince of the House of Bourbon-Parma, he was educated in Austria, France, and Luxembourg. Prince Gaetan fought in the Spanish Civil War where he was wounded six times. In 1940, he enlisted in the U.S. Army, took part in the Normandy landings and made the campaign of France. He died at age 52 in a car accident near Cannes. He left a daughter from his marriage to Princess Margarete of Thurn und Taxis.

== Early life ==
Prince Gaetan of Bourbon-Parma was the youngest child of the last reigning Duke of Parma, Robert I (1848–1907) and his second wife Infanta Maria Antonia of Portugal (1862–1959), daughter of King Miguel of Portugal. Gaetan was the youngest of Duke Robert's twenty-four children. His father had married twice having twelve children in each marriage.

Gaetan was born at the Villa Pianore near Lucca, Tuscany. He was baptized as Gaetano Maria Giuseppe Pio. His godfather was Pope Pius X. Gaetan was only two years old at the death of his father. He was sent to study at Stella Matutina, a Catholic school for boys run by Jesuits priest in Feldkirch, near the Swiss border. At the fall of the Hapsburg dynasty he moved with his brother, Prince Sixtus of Bourbon-Parma to Paris. He finished his education in France and Luxembourg, where his brother Prince Felix of Bourbon-Parma was the husband of the reigning Grand duchess. He accompanied his brother Sixtus in his expeditions to Africa.

== Marriage ==
On 29 April 1931 in Paris, France, Prince Gaetan married HSH Princess Margarete of Thurn and Taxis (1909–2006), daughter of Prince Alexander of Thurn and Taxis, Duke of Castel Duino and Princess Marie Louise of Ligne. They were parents of an only daughter:

- Princess Diana of Bourbon-Parma (Paris, 22 May 1932 – Bad Krozingen, 7 May 2020). She married in 1955 Prince Franz Joseph of Hohenzollern-Sigmaringen and then in 1961 she remarried Hans Joachim Oehmichen (1920–1995). She had three children with her second husband.

Gaetan's marriage was unhappy. He and his wife lived apart for most of their married life. They divorced on 24 January 1950 in Paris.

== Later life ==
He fled Europe in 1941 for the United States, where he was drafted into the United States Army two years later, During World War II, he participated on the side of the Allies, along with his brothers Javier and Felix, the last Grand Duke of Luxembourg by marriage to Charlotte of Luxembourg. In 1943 he tried to enlist in a battalion of Austrians who served in the U.S. Army but was rejected by its French origin. Later he taught at Camp Ritchie, in which a Jewish-German to conduct special operations in Germany formed young, took part in the landing of Normandy and fought the campaign for France.

== Death ==
On the way to visit his brother Luigi prince of Bourbon-Parma, Prince Gaetan suffered a serious car accident in Mandelieu-la-Napoule, on the French Riviera on 8 March 1958. He was taken to a hospital in Cannes where he died the next day. As he had wished, he was buried wearing the red beret of the Requetés of Navarre on 10 March 1958.
