= Margaret Windsor =

Margaret Windsor may refer to:

- Margaret of Windsor (1346–1361), youngest daughter of Edward III
- Princess Margaret of Connaught (1882–1920), first wife of Gustaf Adolf, Crown Prince of Sweden, (later Gustaf VI Adolf) and member of the House of Windsor
- Princess Margaret, Countess of Snowdon (1930–2002), youngest daughter of George VI and member of the House of Windsor

== See also ==
- Princess Margaret (disambiguation)
