= Princess Diana of Bourbon-Parma =

French aristocrat (1932–2020)

Princess Diana
- Princess Franz Josef of Hohenzollern
- Born: 22 May 1932; Paris, French Third Republic
- Died: 4 May 2020 (aged 87); Bad Krozingen, Germany
- Burial: Bad Krozingen
- Spouses: Prince Franz Josef of Hohenzollern (m. 1955; div. 1961) Hans Joachim Oehmichen (m. 1961; died 1995)
- Issue: Alexander Oehmichen; Gaetano Oehmichen; Maria Oehmichen
Names
- Diane Marguerite de Bourbon-Parme
- House: Bourbon-Parma
- Father: Prince Gaetano of Bourbon-Parma
- Mother: Princess Margarete of Thurn and Taxis

Princess Diana Margherita of Bourbon-Parma (Diane Marguerite de Bourbon-Parme in French; 22 May 1932 – 4 May 2020) was a French aristocrat and member of the House of Bourbon-Parma, a cadet branch of the Spanish royal family.

== Biography ==
Princess Diana was born in Paris on 22 May 1932 to Prince Gaetano of Bourbon-Parma and Princess Margarete of Thurn and Taxis. In 1955 she married Prince Franz Josef Hubertus Maria Meinrad Michael of Hohenzollern-Sigmaringen, son of Frederick, Prince of Hohenzollern. She gave birth to a son, Alexander, in 1957.

She and Prince Franz Josef divorced in 1961 after it was revealed that the prince was not Alexander's biological father. On 21 March 1961 she married her son's biological father, Hans Joachim Oehmichen, in Stuttgart.They had two more children, Gaetano and Maria, and had their marriage consecrated in the Catholic Church in 1992. Her first marriage was officially annulled by the Catholic Church on 17 January 1980. Her second husband died in 1995. Diana resided for 8 years in the Villa Le Pianore in Camaiore, a historic residence for the Bourbons and visited there in 2013. Princess Diana died from COVID-19 in Bad Krozingen, Germany on 4 May 2020.

== Ancestry ==
Ancestors of Princess Diana of Bourbon-Parma

8. Charles III, Duke of Parma
4. Robert I, Duke of Parma
9. Princess Louise of Artois
2. Prince Gaetano of Bourbon-Parma
10. Miguel I of Portugal
5. Infanta Maria Antónia of Portugal
11. Adelaide of Löwenstein
1. Princess Diana of Bourbon-Parma
12. Prince Alexander Johann of Thurn and Taxis
6. Alessandro, Duke of Castel Duino
13. Princess Marie of Hohenlohe-Waldenburg-Schillingsfürst
3. Princess Margarete of Thurn and Taxis
14. Louis, 9th Prince of Ligne
7. Princess Marie of Ligne
15. Elisabeth de la Rochefoucauld
