= Princess Margaret Hospital =

Princess Margaret Hospital may refer to:

- Princess Margaret Cancer Centre, Toronto, Canada
- Princess Margaret Hospital (Hong Kong), a major acute general hospital in Kwai Chung, Hong Kong
- Princess Margaret Hospital, Christchurch
- Princess Margaret Hospital for Children, a former hospital in Perth, Australia
- Princess Margaret Hospital (Roseau), Roseau, Dominica
- Princess Margaret Hospital, Funafuti, Funafuti atoll, Tuvalu
- Princess Margaret Hospital, Nassau, Bahamas
- Princess Margaret Hospital, Swindon, Swindon, UK
- Princess Margaret Hospital (Windsor), Windsor, UK
- Princess Margaret Hospital, Lyssons, St. Thomas Parish, Jamaica

== See also ==
- Princess Margaret (disambiguation)
- PMH (disambiguation)
