= Sixtus Affair =

Failed WWI Austro-Hungarian peace attempt

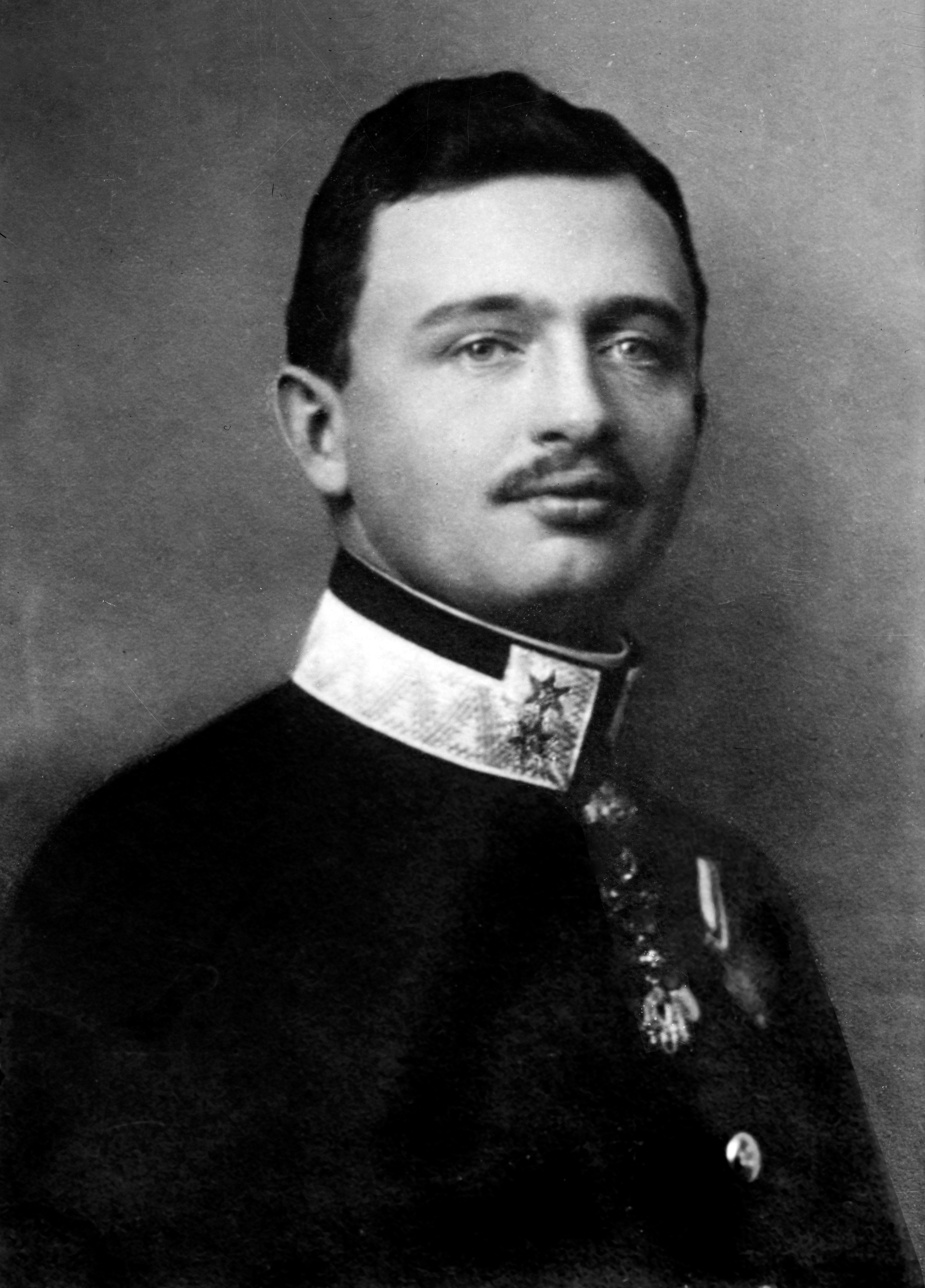
Emperor Charles I.

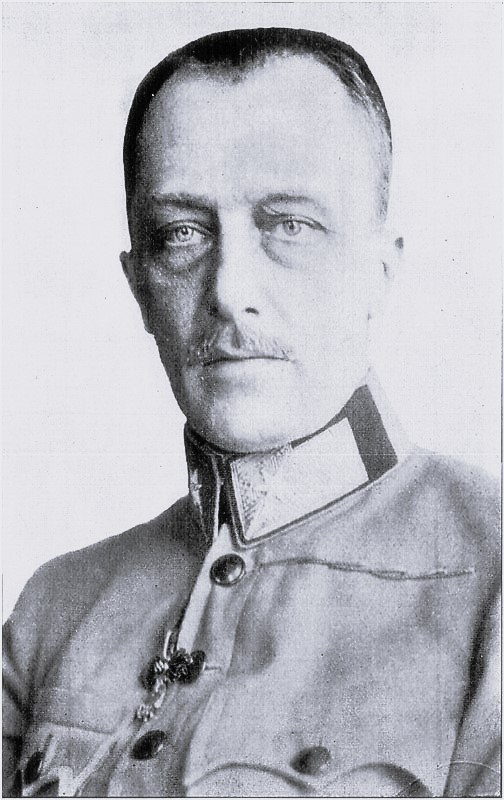
Count Ottokar Czernin

The Sixtus Affair (German: Sixtus-Affäre, Hungarian: Sixtus-ügy) was a failed attempt by Emperor Charles I of Austria to conclude a negotiated peace with the allies in World War I. The affair was named after his brother-in-law and intermediary, Prince Sixtus of Bourbon-Parma.

== Affair ==
In 1917 the war was dragging on towards its fourth year, and Charles decided to secretly enter into peace negotiations with France. He used his brother-in-law, Prince Sixtus of Bourbon-Parma, an officer in the Belgian army, as intermediary as well as enlisting the help of his loyal childhood friend and aide-de-camp Tamás Erdődy. Charles initiated contact with the Prince via contacts in neutral Switzerland, and Empress Zita wrote a letter inviting him to Vienna. Zita's mother Maria Antonia delivered the letter personally. Another intermediary was Jozef Retinger, a London-based Polish literary scholar and budding politician who was a friend of Sixtus, Xavier and Zita of Bourbon-Parma and who had received backing from the British to support the initiative.

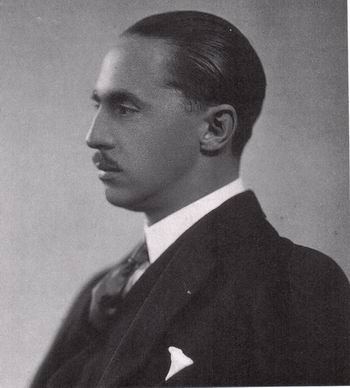
Prince Sixtus of Bourbon-Parma (1930)

Sixtus arrived with French-agreed conditions for talks:

- The restoration to France of Alsace-Lorraine (annexed by Germany after the Franco-Prussian War in 1870);
- The restoration of the independence of Belgium (occupied by Germany since 1914)
- Independence for the Kingdom of Serbia;
- The handover of Constantinople to Russia.

Charles agreed, in principle, to the first three points and wrote a letter dated 24 March 1917 to Sixtus, giving "the secret and unofficial message that I will use all means and all my personal influence" to the President of France.

This attempt at dynastic diplomacy eventually foundered. Germany refused to negotiate over Alsace-Lorraine and, seeing a Russian collapse on the horizon, was loath to give up the war.

In April 1918, after the German-Russian Treaty of Brest-Litovsk, the Austrian Foreign Minister Count Ottokar von Czernin made a speech attacking the incoming French Prime Minister Georges Clemenceau as being the main obstacle to a peace favouring the Central Powers. Clemenceau was incensed and had Emperor Charles' letter to Prince Sixtus published. For a while, there were fears that Germany might occupy Austria. Czernin persuaded Charles to send a 'Word of Honour' to Austria's allies saying that Sixtus had not been authorised to show the letter to the French Government, that Belgium had not been mentioned, and that Clemenceau had lied about the mentioning of the Alsace. Czernin had actually been in contact with the German Embassy throughout the whole crisis, and was attempting to persuade the Emperor to step down because of the Affair. After this failed, Czernin resigned himself.

This affair was an embarrassment to Charles and forced Austria-Hungary into an even more dependent position with regard to its German ally.

== Beatification of Charles I ==
For his role as a peacemaker during 1917–1918, Emperor Charles I of Austria was solemnly declared blessed in a Mass of Beatification on 3 October 2004 by Pope John Paul II.

== In popular culture ==
- In The Young Indiana Jones Chronicles episode "Austria, March 1917" (later re-edited into the film Adventures in the Secret Service), Indiana Jones (working for French Intelligence during World War I) is assigned to smuggle Sixtus and Xavier in and out of Austria for their meeting with Emperor Charles I.

== See also ==
- Spa Conferences (First World War)
