= PMH =

PMH may stand for:

- Phú Mỹ Hưng urban area, a planned city in Vietnam
- Greater Portsmouth Regional Airport, IATA code
- OAI-PMH, the OAI Protocol for Metadata Harvesting
- Past medical history
- Princess Margaret Hospital (disambiguation), various hospitals
- Portsmouth Harbour railway station, Hampshire, England, National Rail station code
