= Princess Maria Antonia of Parma (1895–1977) =

Benedictine nun

Princess Maria Antonia
- Mother Maria Antonia
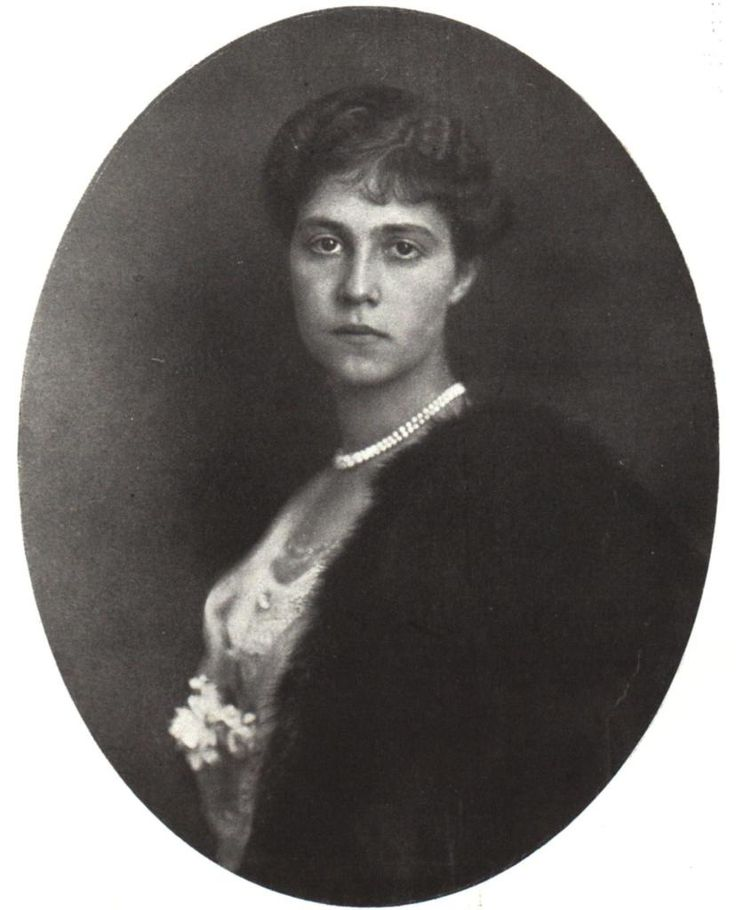
- Maria Antonia in c. 1915
- Born: 7 November 1895; Schwarzau am Steinfeld, Lower Austria, Austria-Hungary
- Died: 19 October 1977 (aged 81); Solesmes, France
- Burial: Sainte-Cécile Abbey, Solesmes, France
Names
- French: Marie-Antoinette Sophie Louise Josèphe Michèle Gabrielle Roberte Agnès Alphonse Élisabeth Pie Henriette Jeanne
- House: House of Bourbon-Parma
- Father: Robert I, Duke of Parma
- Mother: Infanta Maria Antónia of Portugal
- Religion: Roman Catholic

Princess Maria Antonia of Bourbon-Parma (7 November 1895 – 19 October 1977) was a member of the House of Bourbon-Parma and a Benedictine nun. She was the daughter of Robert I, Duke of Parma and his second wife, Infanta Maria Antónia of Portugal.

== Early life ==
Princess Maria Antonia was born in exile at Schloss Schwarzau in Lower Austria. As the daughter of the last reigning Duke of Parma, she grew up in a vast family of 24 siblings, including Zita, Empress of Austria, Felix, Prince consort of Luxembourg, Princess Marie Louise of Bourbon-Parma, and Xavier, Duke of Parma. Her upbringing was characterized by a strict Catholic education and frequent travels between the family's estates in Austria and Italy. During her youth, she was noted for her piety and interest in the liturgical life of the Church, following the tradition of several of her sisters, such as Princess Maria Adelaide and Princess Francesca Giuseppa, who also chose religious vocations.

== Later life and death ==
In the early 1910s, Maria Antonia was considered a potential bride for Infante Jaime, Duke of Madrid, but she ultimately did not marry him. Instead, she followed a religious calling and entered the Benedictine Order. She became a nun at the Abbey of Saint Cecile in Solesmes, taking the name Mother Maria Antonia.

During World War II, while her sister Empress Zita and mother lived in reduced circumstances in Quebec, Maria Antonia remained dedicated to her cloistered life in France. She died in Solesmes in 1977 at the age of 81.

== Ancestry ==
Ancestors of Princess Maria Antonia of Parma (1895–1977)

8. Charles II, Duke of Parma
4. Charles III, Duke of Parma
9. Princess Maria Teresa of Savoy
2. Robert I, Duke of Parma
10. Charles Ferdinand, Duke of Berry
5. Louise Marie Thérèse of France
11. Princess Marie-Caroline of Bourbon-Two Sicilies
1. Princess Maria Antonia of Bourbon-Parma
12. John VI of Portugal
6. Miguel I of Portugal
13. Carlota Joaquina of Spain
3. Infanta Maria Antónia of Portugal
14. Constantine, Hereditary Prince of Löwenstein
7. Princess Adelaide of Löwenstein
15. Princess Agnes of Hohenlohe-Langenburg

== Bibliography ==
- Beéche, Arturo E. (2012). The Borbons of Parma: History of a Royal House. Eurohistory. ISBN 978-0985460303.
- McNaughton, Arnold (1973). The Book of Kings: A Royal Genealogy. Garnstone Press. ISBN 978-0900391194.
- Willis, Daniel (1999). The Descendants of Louis XIII. Clearfield. ISBN 978-0806349428.
