= Robert I of Parma =

Duke of Parma and Piacenza from 1854 to 1859

Robert I
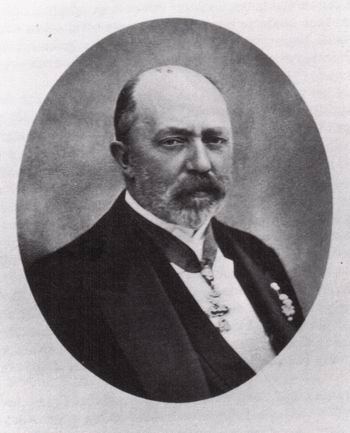
- Duke Robert I in 1900

Duke of Parma and Piacenza
- Reign: 27 March 1854 – 9 June 1859
- Predecessor: Charles III
- Successor: Monarchy abolished; Victor Emmanuel II as King of Italy
- Regent: Louise Marie Thérèse d'Artois

Head of the House of Bourbon-Parma
- Tenure: 9 June 1859 – 16 November 1907
- Predecessor: Monarchy abolished
- Successor: Henry
- Born: 9 July 1848; Florence, Tuscany
- Died: 16 November 1907 (aged 59); Viareggio, Italy
- Spouses: Princess Maria Pia of Bourbon-Two Sicilies (m. 1869; died 1882) Infanta Maria Antonia of Portugal (m. 1884)
- Issue more...: Marie Louise, Princess of Bulgaria; Henry, Duke of Parma; Joseph, Duke of Parma; Beatrice, Countess of Lucchesi-Palli; Elias, Duke of Parma; Prince Sixtus; Xavier, Duke of Parma; Zita, Empress of Austria; Felix, Prince Consort of Luxembourg; Princess Maria Antonia; Prince René; Prince Gaetano
- House: Bourbon-Parma
- Father: Charles III of Parma
- Mother: Louise Marie Thérèse d'Artois

Robert I (Italian: Roberto Carlo Luigi Maria, French: Robert Charles Louis Marie, 9 July 1848 – 16 November 1907) was the last sovereign Duke of Parma and Piacenza from 1854 until 1859, when the duchy was annexed to Sardinia-Piedmont during the Risorgimento. He was a member of the House of Bourbon-Parma and descended from Philip, Duke of Parma, the third son of King Philip V of Spain and Queen Elisabeth Farnese.

== Biography ==
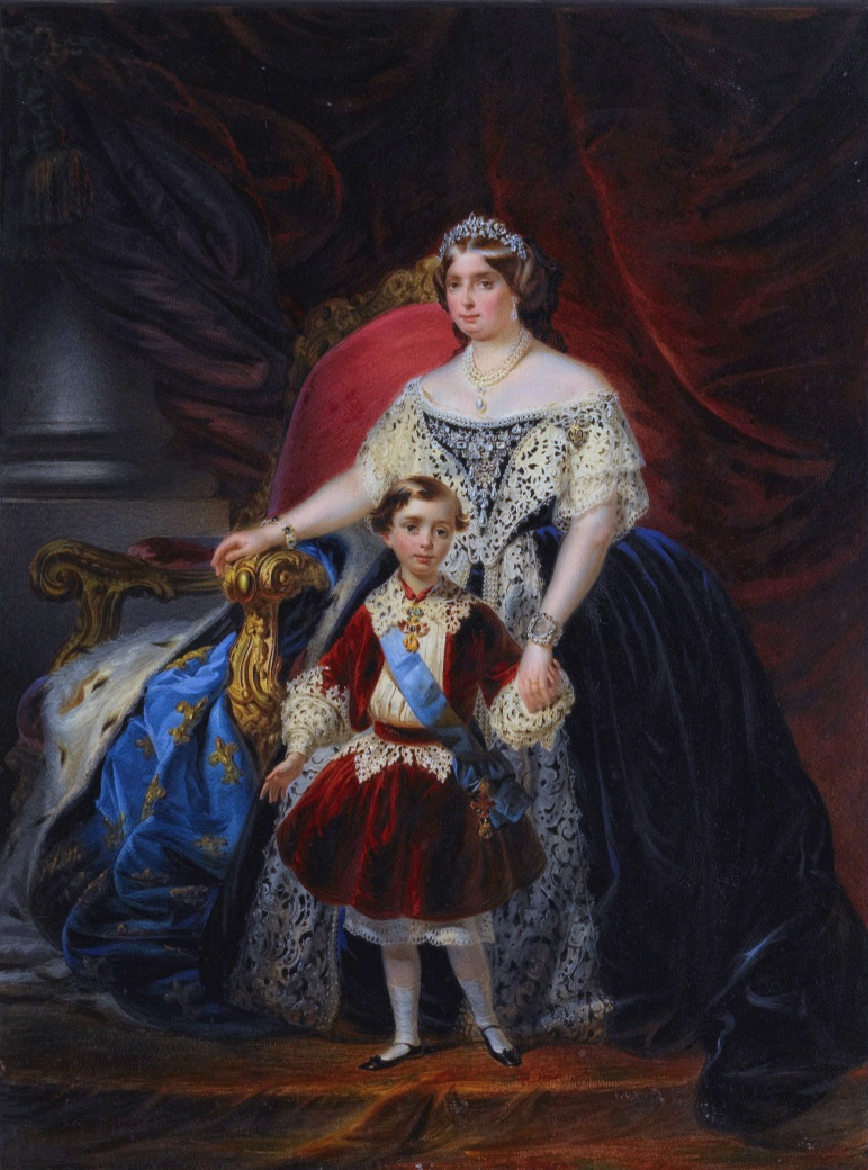
Robert I as Duke of Parma with his mother Louise Marie Thérèse in 1854.

=== Early life ===
Born in Florence, Robert was the elder son of Duke Charles III of Parma and Louise Marie Thérèse d'Artois, daughter of Charles Ferdinand, Duke of Berry and granddaughter of King Charles X of France. He succeeded his father to the ducal throne in 1854 upon the latter's assassination, when he was only six, while his mother stood as regent. The duchess initially dismissed some of her unpopular husband's most reactionary advisers, but was surprised by the Mazzini uprisings in July 1854 and then reverted to a harshly repressive policy that continued until the Second Italian War of Independence.

When Robert was eleven years old, he was deposed, as Piedmontese troops annexed other Italian states, ultimately to form the Kingdom of Italy. Despite losing his throne, Robert and his family enjoyed considerable wealth, traveling in a private train of more than a dozen cars from his castles at Schwarzau am Steinfeld near Vienna, to Villa Pianore in northwest Italy, and the magnificent Château de Chambord in France.

=== Death and legacy ===
Less than four months after Robert's death in November 1907, the Grand Marshal of the Austrian court declared six of the children of his first marriage legally incompetent (they had severe intellectual disabilities), at the behest of his widow, Maria Antonia. Nonetheless, Robert's primary heir was his son Elias, the youngest son of his first marriage and the only one of his sons by that marriage to beget children of his own. Elias also became the legal guardian of his six elder siblings. Elias had eight children, seven of whom lived to advanced age, but only one of them got married, a daughter who had three children.

The two eldest sons of Robert's second marriage, Sixte and Xavier, eventually sued their older half-brother Elias for trying to obtain a greater share of the ducal fortune. They lost in the French courts, leaving the children of Robert's second marriage with very modest wealth, and the need to earn a living; some of his younger sons served in the Austrian armed forces. Nevertheless, two of the children born of the second marriage made extraordinary marriages: Felix married the grand-duchess of Luxembourg shortly after her accession and is the great-grandfather of the present grand duke. Zita married the last Emperor of Austria; the present claimant is her grandson.

== Marriages and issue ==
=== First marriage ===
On 5 April 1869, while in exile in Rome, he married Princess Maria Pia of Bourbon-Two Sicilies (1849–1882), daughter of King Ferdinand II of the Two Sicilies.

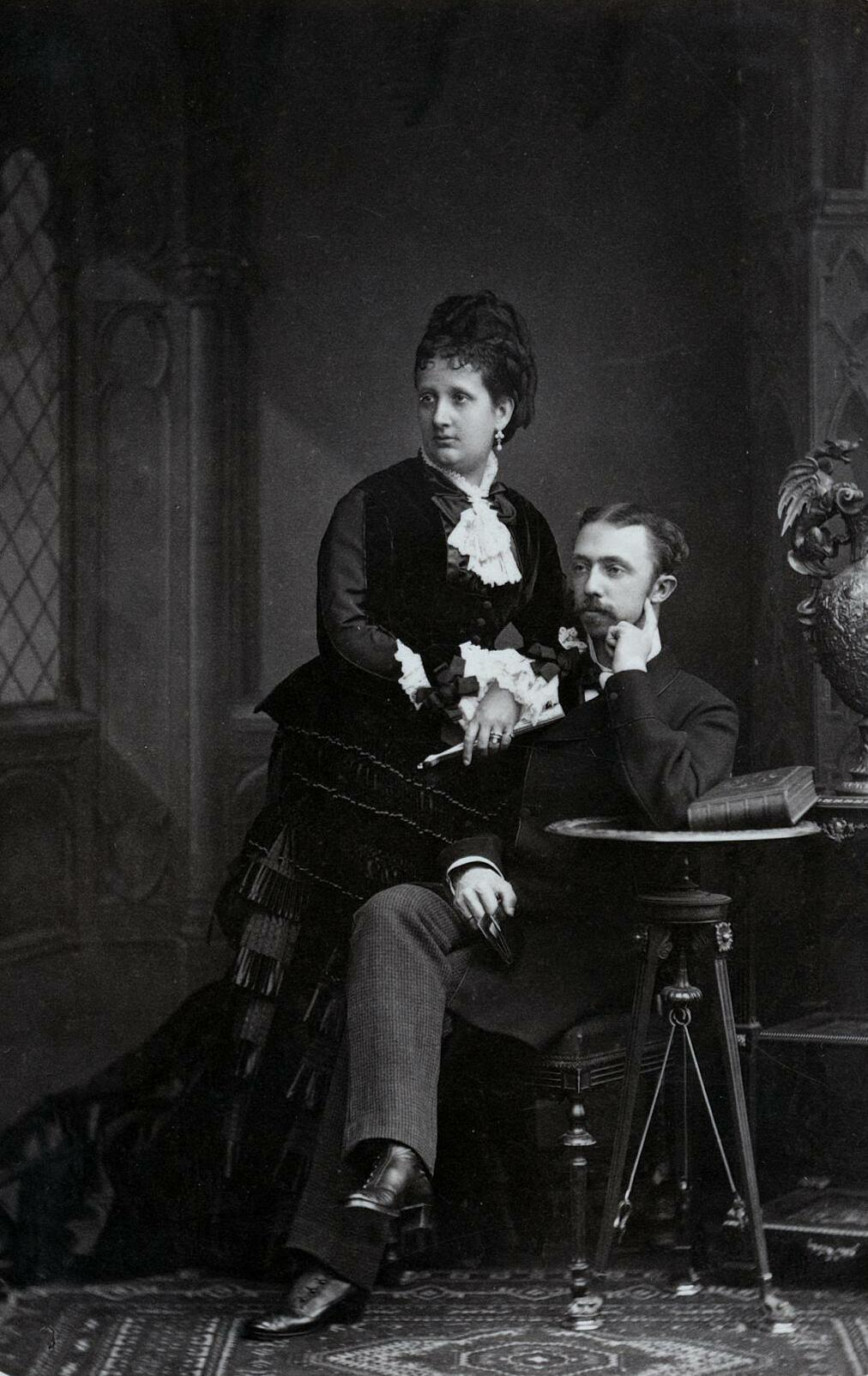
The couple in c. 1880

She was his half first cousin once removed, as her father (Ferdinand II) and Robert's maternal grandmother (Caroline, Duchess of Berry) were half-siblings, both being children of Francis I of the Two Sicilies from his two different wives.

Maria Pia belonged to the deposed royal family of the Kingdom of Two Sicilies and was thus a Bourbon, like her husband. She gave birth to 12 children, many of whom had intellectual disabilities, before dying in childbirth in 1882:

Name	Birth	Death	Notes
Princess Maria Luisa	17 January 1870	31 January 1899 (aged 29)	Married Ferdinand I, Prince (later King) of Bulgaria and had issue.
Ferdinando, Prince of Piacenza	5 March 1871	14 April 1871 (aged 0)	Heir of Parma in 1871. Died in infancy.
Princess Luisa Maria	24 March 1872	22 June 1943 (aged 71)	
Henry, Duke of Parma	13 June 1873	16 November 1939 (aged 66)	Titular pretender of Parma 1907-1939. From 1907 (his father's death), his brother Elias took up the role as head of the family, although Henry continued to be considered the nominal pretender to the ducal throne. He held the title until his death.
Princess Maria Immacolata	21 July 1874	16 May 1914 (aged 39)	
Joseph, Duke of Parma	30 June 1875	7 January 1950 (aged 74)	Titular pretender of Parma 1939-1950. His brother Elias continued the role as head of the family as he had done with their brother Henry.
Princess Maria Teresa	15 October 1876	25 January 1959 (aged 82)	
Princess Maria Pia	9 October 1877	29 January 1915 (aged 37)	
Princess Beatrice	9 January 1879	11 March 1946 (aged 67)	Married Count Pietro Lucchesi-Palli (grandson of Princess Caroline of Naples and Sicily and her second husband) and had issue.
Elias, Duke of Parma	23 July 1880	27 June 1959 (aged 78)	Titular pretender of Parma 1950–1959. Married Archduchess Maria Anna of Austria and had issue. Last surviving child of his father's first marriage.
Princess Maria Anastasia	25 August 1881	7 September 1881 (aged 0)	Died in infancy.
Prince Augusto	22 September 1882	22 September 1882 (aged 0)	(stillborn). Maria Pia died giving birth to this child.

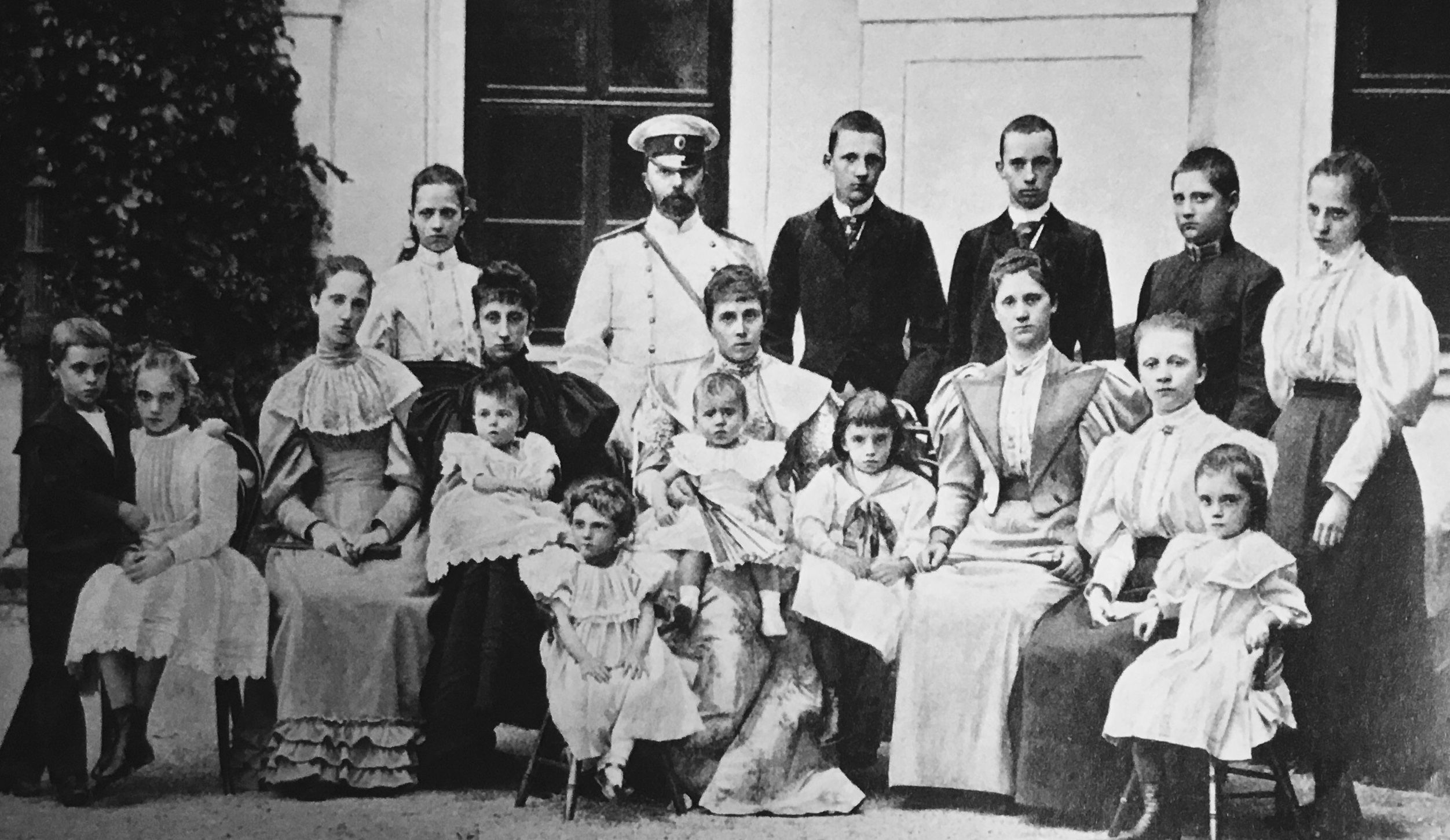
The family in c. 1890s

=== Second marriage ===
After his first wife's death in childbirth, he remarried on 15 October 1884 to Infanta Maria Antonia of Portugal, daughter of the deposed King Miguel I of Portugal and Adelaide of Löwenstein-Wertheim-Rosenberg. Maria Antonia was his second cousin once removed as her paternal grandmother (Carlota Joaquina of Spain) and Robert's great-grandmother (Maria Luisa of Spain) were siblings, both being daughters of Charles IV of Spain and Maria Luisa of Parma. She had another 12 children:

Name	Birth	Death	Notes
Princess Maria Adelaide	5 August 1885	6 February 1959 (aged 73)	A Benedictine nun at St. Cecilia's Abbey, Solesmes.
Prince Sixtus	1 August 1886	14 March 1934 (aged 47)	Married Duchess Hedwige de La Rochefoucauld and had a daughter, Isabelle.
Xavier, Duke of Parma	25 May 1889	7 May 1977 (aged 87)	Titular pretender of Parma 1974–1977. Married Countess Madeleine de Bourbon-Busset and had issue. Carlist pretender to the throne of Spain.
Princess Francesca	22 April 1890	7 October 1978 (aged 88)	A Benedictine nun at St. Cecilia's Abbey, Solesmes.
Princess Zita	9 May 1892	14 March 1989 (aged 96)	Married Emperor Charles I of Austria. Last surviving child of her father's two marriages.
Prince Felix	28 October 1893	8 April 1970 (aged 76)	Married Grand Duchess Charlotte of Luxembourg, his first cousin (their mothers were sisters), and had issue, including Jean, Grand Duke of Luxembourg.
Prince René	17 October 1894	30 July 1962 (aged 67)	Married Princess Margaret of Denmark and had issue, including Queen Anne of Romania.
Princess Maria Antonia	7 November 1895	19 October 1977 (aged 81)	A Benedictine nun at St. Cecilia's Abbey, Solesmes.
Princess Isabella	14 June 1898	28 July 1984 (aged 86)	Died unmarried.
Prince Luigi	5 December 1899	4 December 1967 (aged 67)	Married Princess Maria Francesca of Savoy and had issue.
Princess Henrietta Anna	8 March 1903	13 June 1987 (aged 84)	Died unmarried.
Prince Gaetano	11 June 1905	9 March 1958 (aged 52)	Married Princess Margarete of Thurn and Taxis, daughter of Alessandro, 1st Duke of Castel Duino. They had a daughter, Diana (who married Prince Franz Joseph, son of Frederick, Prince of Hohenzollern) and later divorced.

== Honours ==
- Duchy of Parma: Grand Prefect of the Sacred Military Constantinian Order of St. George
- Spain: Knight of the Order of the Golden Fleece, 19 January 1854
- Duchy of Modena and Reggio: Grand Cross of the Order of the Eagle of Este, 1856
- Kingdom of Bavaria: Knight of the Order of St. Hubert, 1897
- Grand Duchy of Hesse: Grand Cross of the Ludwig Order, 9 November 1899
- Kingdom of France: Knight of the Order of the Holy Spirit, unknown date.

== Ancestry ==
Ancestors of Robert I of Parma

16. Ferdinand, Duke of Parma
8. Louis I of Etruria
17. Maria Amalia of Austria
4. Charles II of Parma
18. Charles IV of Spain
9. Maria Luisa, Duchess of Lucca
19. Maria Luisa of Parma
2. Charles III of Parma
20. Victor Amadeus III of Sardinia
10. Victor Emmanuel I of Sardinia
21. Maria Antonia Ferdinanda of Spain
5. Maria Teresa of Savoy
22. Ferdinand Karl, Archduke of Austria-Este
11. Maria Theresa of Austria-Este
23. Maria Beatrice d'Este, Duchess of Massa
1. Robert I, Duke of Parma
24. Louis, Dauphin of France
12. Charles X of France
25. Maria Josepha of Saxony
6. Charles Ferdinand, Duke of Berry
26. Victor Amadeus III of Sardinia (= 20)
13. Maria Theresa of Savoy
27. Maria Antonia Ferdinanda of Spain (= 21)
3. Louise of Artois
28. Ferdinand I of the Two Sicilies
14. Francis I of the Two Sicilies
29. Maria Carolina of Austria
7. Maria Carolina of Naples and Sicily
30. Leopold II, Holy Roman Emperor
15. Maria Clementina of Austria
31. Maria Louise of Spain

=== Patrilineal descent ===
Patrilineal descent

Robert's patriline is the line from which he is descended father to son.

Patrilineal descent is the principle behind membership in royal houses, as it can be traced back through the generations - which means that if Duke Robert were to choose an historically accurate house name it would be Robert, as all his male-line ancestors have been of that house.

Robert is a member of the House of Bourbon-Parma, a sub-branch of the House of Bourbon-Spain, itself originally a branch of the House of Bourbon, and thus of the Capetian dynasty and of the Robertians.

Robert's patriline is the line from which he is descended father to son. It follows the Dukes of Parma as well as the Kings of Spain, France, and Navarre. The line can be traced back more than 1,200 years from Robert of Hesbaye to the present day, through Kings of France & Navarre, Spain and Two-Sicilies, Dukes of Parma and Grand-Dukes of Luxembourg, Princes of Orléans and Emperors of Brazil. It is one of the oldest in Europe.

1. Robert II of Worms and Rheingau (Robert of Hesbaye), 770 - 807
2. Robert III of Worms and Rheingau, 808 - 834
3. Robert IV the Strong, 820 - 866
4. Robert I of France, 866 - 923
5. Hugh the Great, 895 - 956
6. Hugh Capet, 941 - 996
7. Robert II of France, 972 - 1031
8. Henry I of France, 1008–1060
9. Philip I of France, 1053–1108
10. Louis VI of France, 1081–1137
11. Louis VII of France, 1120–1180
12. Philip II of France, 1165–1223
13. Louis VIII of France, 1187–1226
14. Louis IX of France, 1215–1270
15. Robert, Count of Clermont, 1256–1317
16. Louis I, Duke of Bourbon, 1279–1342
17. James I of La Marche, 1319–1362
18. Jean I of La Marche, 1344–1393
19. Louis, Count of Vendôme, 1376–1446
20. John VIII of Vendôme, 1428–1478
21. François, Count of Vendôme, 1470–1495
22. Charles de Bourbon, Duke of Vendôme, 1489–1537
23. Antoine, King of Navarre, Duke of Vendôme, 1518–1562
24. Henry IV, King of France and of Navarre, 1553–1610
25. Louis XIII, King of France and Navarre, 1601–1643
26. Louis XIV, King of France and Navarre, 1638–1715
27. Louis, Grand Dauphin of France, 1661–1711
28. Philip V of Spain, 1683–1746
29. Philip, Duke of Parma, 1720–1765
30. Ferdinand I of Parma, 1751–1802
31. Louis of Etruria, 1773–1803
32. Charles II of Parma, 1799–1883
33. Charles III of Parma, 1823–1854
34. Robert I, Duke of Parma, 1848–1907

Robert I of Parma House of Bourbon-Parma Cadet branch of the House of Bourbon Born: 9 July 1848 Died: 16 November 1907
Regnal titles
Preceded by Charles III	Duke of Parma; 1854–1859	Succeeded by Annexation by the Kingdom of Italy
Titles in pretence
New title	— TITULAR — Duke of Parma; 1859–1907; Reason for succession failure: Annexed by Kingdom of Italy	Succeeded by Henry
