= Princess Margarete of Thurn and Taxis =

Princess Margarete
- Princess Gaetano of Bourbon-Parma
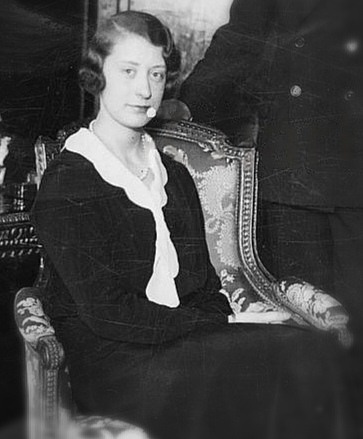
- Princess Margarete in the 1930s
- Born: 8 November 1909; Château de Belœil, Hainaut, Belgium
- Died: 21 September 2006 (aged 96); Hotel Atlantico, Forte dei Marmi, Tuscany
- Spouse: Prince Gaetano of Bourbon-Parma (m. 1931; div. 1950)
- Issue: Princess Diana
Names
- Margarete Marie Therese Elisabeth Frederike Alexandra Louise
- House: Thurn and Taxis
- Father: Alessandro, 1st Duke of Castel Duino
- Mother: Princess Marie Susanne of Ligne

Princess Margarete of Thurn and Taxis (German: Margarete Marie Therese Elisabeth Friederike Alexandra Louise Prinzessin von Thurn und Taxis; 8 November 1909 – 21 September 2006) was the only daughter of Prince Alexander of Thurn and Taxis, Duke of Castel Duino, and Princess Marie Susanne of Ligne, making her a member of the House of Thurn and Taxis. She married Prince Gaetano of Bourbon-Parma in 1931, becoming a member of the House of Bourbon-Parma.

== Early life ==
Princess Margarete of Thurn and Taxis was born on 8 November 1909 in the Château de Belœil (where her mother resided as the Château is owned by the House of Ligne) as the last children (and only daughter) of Prince Alexander of Thurn and Taxis, and his first wife Princess Marie Susanne of Ligne. Her parents divorced in 1919.

At the time of her birth she possessed the style of Serene Highness as a member of the Princely House of Thurn and Taxis. She was also made Princess della Torre e Tasso in 1923 when her father was incorporated into the Italian nobility with the titles of "Prince della Torre e Tasso" and "Duke of Castel Duino", upon concession of Victor Emmanuel III of Italy, when Margarete's family moved to the Kingdom of Italy.

Princess Margarete was a passionate scholar of natural sciences. She spent most of her childhood between the Thurn und Taxis' Duino Castle, in Trieste, and the Château de Belœil, in Belgium.

== Marriage and issue ==
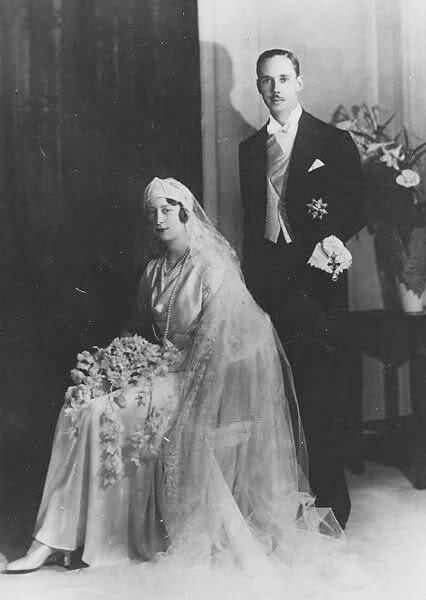
Wedding of Prince Gaetano and Princess Margarete in 1931

Margarete married Prince Gaetano of Bourbon-Parma, the last child and son of Robert I, Duke of Parma and his second wife Infanta Maria Antónia of Portugal on 29 April 1931: the wedding took place in Paris, in the estate of Cardinal Archbishop Verdier whose residence had been transformed into a chapel. Nearly every great ruiling princely family in Europe was represented at the wedding. Some notable attendants were the Dowager Duchess of Parma, Prince Felix of Bourbon-Parma and his wife, the reigning Grand Duchess of Luxembourg, Grand Duchess Elena Vladimirovna, Prince Nicholas of Greece and Denmark, Princess Eugenie of Greece and Denmark, Infante Jaime, Duke of Madrid, Empress Zita and the Belgian ambassador, Edmond de Gaiffier d'Hestroy. After her marriage, Margarete used the style of "Royal Highness" with the title of "Princess of Bourbon-Parma", and was also known as "Princess Gaetano of Bourbon-Parma".

Margarete and Gaetano had one only daughter:

- Princess Diana Margherita of Bourbon-Parma (Paris, 22 May 1932 – Bad Grozingen, 7 May 2020). She married firstly in 1955 Prince Franz Joseph of Hohenzollern-Sigmaringen, son of Frederick, Prince of Hohenzollern and then in 1961 she remarried Hans Joachim Oehmichen. She had three children with her second husband.

As wedding gifts from her husband, "according to family tradition", she received a necklace of three strands of pearls with an emerald brooch, and a ring with two cultured pearls. Her acquired aunt Princess Eugenie of Greece and Denmark (her uncle Raimundo, 2nd Duke of Castel Duino's wife), gave her an amethyst necklace on the occasion of her wedding. After the marriage, Margarete and Gaetano settled at Villa Borbone, near Lucca, and at Villa La Vallina, near Camaiore. They spent most time at Villa La Pianore, where they’d raise their daughter.

In the 1930s, she organized and attended progressive events sponsored by the House of Thurn and Taxis and by her father, in Trieste, always accompanied by her husband. These events were attended by the most important figures of Trieste, Gorizia, Udine, and other Friulian cities. She attended the wedding of Princess Maria Francesca of Savoy and Prince Louis of Bourbon-Parma in January 1939 at Palazzo del Quirinale, Rome.

After a few years of marriage, the Prince and Princess began to live apart. Margarete and Gaetano obtained a first Hungarian divorce, in Budapest, on 30 August 1940 and a (final) French divorce on 24 January 1950. According to other sources, their final divorce arrived in 1955. Margarete was allowed to keep the title of "Princess of Bourbon-Parma" and the membership of the Royal House.

As a divorcee, she began to live between Italy, France, and Torremolinos, in Andalusia, Spain, from 1953.

== Death ==
Princess Margarete died on 21 September 2006 at Hotel Atlantico, in Forte dei Marmi, Lucca, in Tuscany, aged 96. She was buried at the Castel Duino Cemetery, in Trieste.

== Ancestry ==
Ancestors of Princess Margarete of Thurn and Taxis

8. Prince Hugo Maximilian of Thurn and Taxis
4. Prince Alexander Johann of Thurn and Taxis
9. Countess Almeria von Belcredi
2. Alessandro, 1st Duke of Castel Duino
10. Prince Egon of Hohenlohe-Waldenburg-Schillingsfürst
5. Princess Maria of Hohenlohe-Waldenburg-Schillingsfürst
11. Countess Theresa von Thurn-Hofer-Valsássina
1. Princess Margarete of Thurn and Taxis
12. Henri, Hereditary Prince de Ligne
6. Louis, 9th Prince of Ligne
13. Marguerite de Talleyrand-Périgord
3. Princess Marie of Ligne
14. Sosthène de La Rochefoucauld, Duc de Doudeauville
7. Elisabeth de la Rochefoucauld
15. Princess Marie de Ligne

== Honours ==
- (Austria-Hungary) Austrian Empire:
  - Dame of the Order of the Starry Cross
