= Prinses Margriet =

Prinses Margriet (English: Princess Margaret) may refer to:-

- Princess Margriet of the Netherlands (b 1943).
- Prinses Margriet Army Base, Zwolle, Netherlands
- Prinses Margriet Kanaal, a canal in the Netherlands
- MV Prinses Margriet, a Dutch coaster in service 1943-54
