= Princess Margaret (disambiguation) =

Princess Margaret (1930–2002) was the daughter of King George VI of the United Kingdom and Elizabeth Bowes-Lyon; sister of Queen Elizabeth II of the United Kingdom.

Princess Margaret may also refer to:

== People ==
- Margaret of York (Duchess of Burgundy) (1446-1503), sister of Edward IV of England
- Margaret of York (1472) (1472-1472), daughter of Edward IV of England
- Margaret Tudor (1489–1541), daughter of Henry VII of England
- Princess Louise Margaret of Prussia (Duchess of Connaught by marriage) (1860–1917), wife of Prince Arthur, Duke of Connaught, third son of Queen Victoria
- Princess Margaret of Prussia (1872–1954), daughter of Frederick III, German Emperor and Victoria, Princess Royal of the United Kingdom
- Princess Margaret of Connaught (1882–1920), daughter of Prince Arthur, Duke of Connaught and granddaughter of Queen Victoria
- Princess Margaret of Denmark (1895–1992), daughter of Prince Valdemar of Denmark and granddaughter of Christian IX of Denmark and Louise of Hesse-Kassel (or Hesse-Cassel)
- Princess Margaretha of Sweden (1899–1977), daughter of Prince Carl, Duke of Västergötland and granddaughter of King Oscar II of Sweden and Norway, wife of Prince Axel of Denmark
- Princess Margarete of Thurn and Taxis (1909–2006), daughter of Alessandro, Duke of Castel Duino and wife of Prince Gaetano of Bourbon-Parma
- Princess Margaretha, Mrs. Ambler (born 1934), daughter of Prince Gustaf Adolf, Duke of Västerbotten and granddaughter of King Gustaf VI Adolf of Sweden; sister of King Carl XVI Gustaf of Sweden
- Princess Margriet of the Netherlands (born 1942), granddaughter of Queen Wilhelmina of the Netherlands, daughter of Queen Juliana of the Netherlands; sister of Queen Beatrix of the Netherlands and aunt of King Willem Alexander of the Netherlands
- Princess Margareta of Romania (born 1949), eldest daughter of King Michael I of Romania

== Other uses ==
- Princess Margaret Rose, Preserved British Steam Locomotive 46203
- HMS Princess Margaret, Royal Navy World War I minelayer
- PS Princess Margaret, a paddle steamer

== See also ==
- Princess Margaret Hospital (disambiguation)
- Prinses Margriet (disambiguation)
- Queen Margaret (disambiguation)
