= Queen Margaret =

Queen Margaret may refer to:

== Queens regnant ==
- Margaret of Scotland (Maid of Norway) (1286–1290), heiress of Scotland and disputed Queen of Scots
- Margaret I of Denmark (1353–1412), de facto Queen Regnant of Denmark, Norway and Sweden in the early 15th century
- Margrethe II of Denmark (born 1940), Queen Regnant of Denmark from 1972 to 2024
- Tui Manu'a Matelita (1872–1895), born Margaret Young, Queen of Manu'a in the late 19th century

== Queens consort ==
- Saint Margaret of Scotland (c. 1045–1093), Queen Consort of Malcolm III
- Margareta Hasbjörnsdatter, Queen Consort of Harald III of Denmark
- Margaret Fredkulla (1080s–1130), Queen Consort of Magnus III of Norway and King Niels of Denmark
- Margaret of Navarre (1135–1183), Queen Consort of William I of Sicily
- Margaret of L'Aigle, Queen Consort of García Ramírez of Navarre
- Margaret of Sweden (c. 1155–1209), Queen Consort of King Sverre of Norway
- Margaret of France (1157–1197), junior Queen Consort of Henry the Young King of England and Queen Consort of Béla III of Hungary
- Margaret of Hungary (born 1175, living 1223), Byzantine Empress by marriage, in second marriage Queen consort of Thessalonica
- Margaret of Bohemia (also known as Dagmar of Bohemia; c. 1186–1212/13), Queen Consort of Valdemar II of Denmark
- Margaret of Austria (c. 1204–1266), Queen Consort of Henry VII of Germany and Ottokar II of Bohemia
- Margaret Skulesdatter (1208–1270), Queen Consort of Haakon IV of Norway
- Margaret of Bourbon (1211–1256), Queen Consort of Theobald I of Navarre
- Margaret of Provence (1221–1295), Queen Consort of Louis IX of France
- Margaret Sambiria (1230?–1282), Queen Consort of Christopher I of Denmark
- Margaret of England (1240–1275), Queen Consort of Alexander III of Scotland
- Margaret of Burgundy (1250–1308), Queen Consort of Charles I of Sicily
- Margaret of Brandenburg (1270–1315), Queen Consort of Przemysł II of Poland
- Margaret of Brabant (1276–1311), Queen Consort of Henry VII of Germany
- Margaret of Lusignan (1276–1296), Queen Consort of Thoros III of Armenia
- Margaret of Scotland (1261–1283), Queen Consort of Eric II of Norway
- Margaret of France (died 1318), Queen Consort of Edward I of England
- Margaret of Burgundy (1290–1315), Queen Consort of Louis X of France
- Margaret II, Countess of Hainaut (1311–1356), Queen consort of Louis IV, Holy Roman Emperor
- Margaret of Bohemia (1335–1349), Queen Consort of Louis I of Hungary
- Margaret Drummond (1340–1375), Queen Consort of David II of Scotland
- Margaret of Soissons, Queen of Armenia, Queen Consort of Leo V of Armenia
- Margaret of Durazzo (1347–1412), Queen Consort of Charles III of Naples
- Margaret of Prades (1395–1422/88–1429), Queen Consort of King Martin of Aragon
- Margaret of Anjou (1430–1482), Queen Consort of Henry VI of England, appears in Shakespeare's first tetralogy of history plays
- Margaret of Denmark (1456–1486), Queen Consort of James III of Scotland
- Margaret Tudor (1489–1541), Queen Consort of James IV of Scotland and elder sister of Henry VIII of England
- Marguerite de Navarre (1492–1549), Queen Consort of Henry II of Navarra
- Margaret Leijonhufvud (1516–1551), Queen Consort of Gustav I of Sweden
- Margaret of Valois (1553–1615), Queen Consort of Henry IV of France
- Margaret of Austria (1584–1611), Queen Consort of Philip III of Spain
- Margaret Theresa of Spain (1651–1673), Queen Consort of Leopold I, Holy Roman Emperor
- Margherita of Savoy (1851–1926), Queen Consort of Umberto I of Italy

== Organisations ==
- Queen Margaret's School, York, an independent girls' school in York, England
- Queen Margaret University, in Edinburgh, Scotland
- Queen Margaret Union, a student union at the University of Glasgow, Scotland

== See also ==
- Empress Margaret (disambiguation)
- Princess Margaret (disambiguation)
