= Prince Sixtus of Bourbon-Parma =

Italian aristocrat

Prince Sixtus
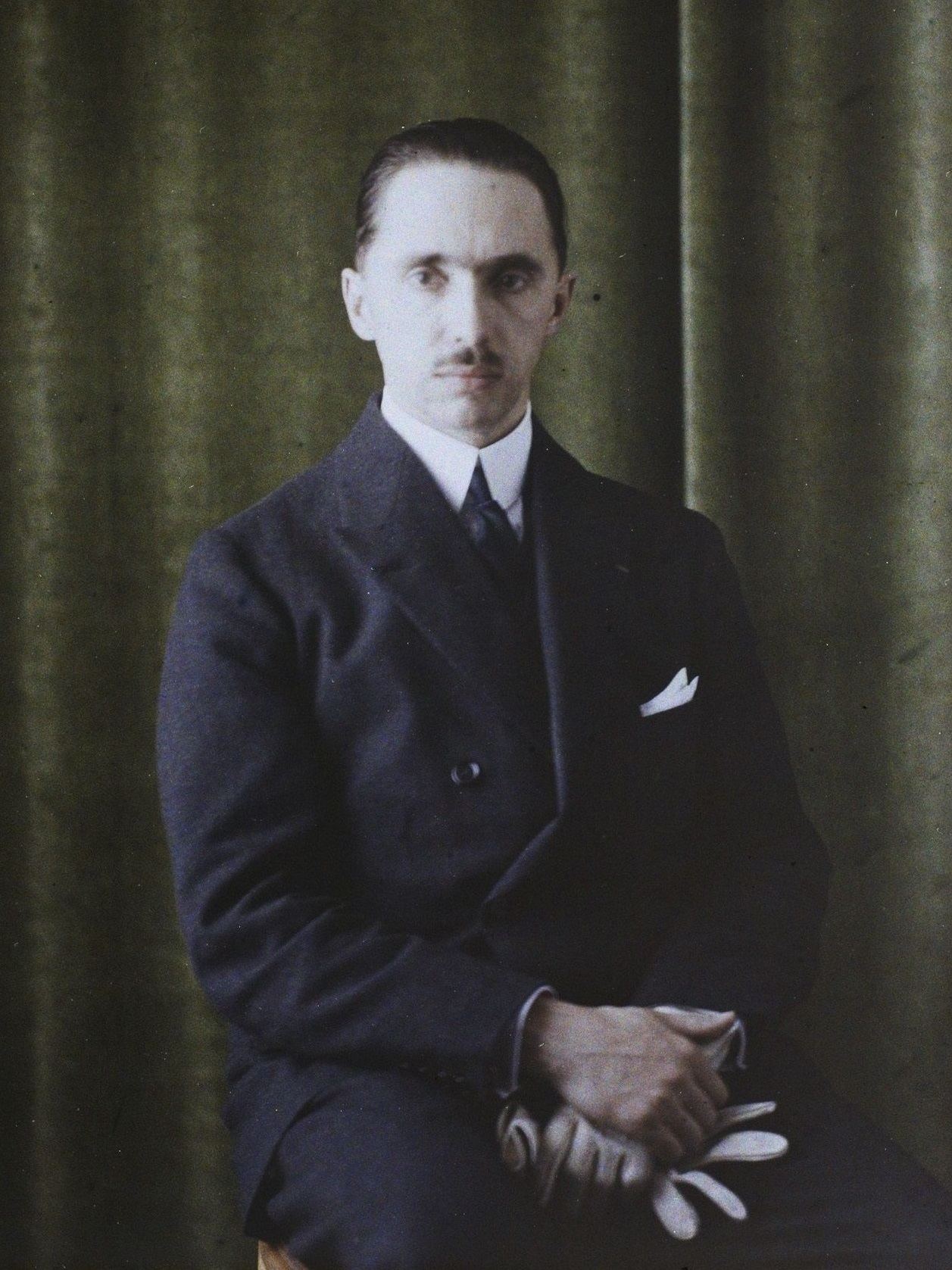
- 1926 autochrome
- Born: 1 August 1886; Schloss Wartegg, Canton of St. Gallen, Switzerland
- Died: 14 March 1934 (aged 47); Paris, France
- Burial: Souvigny Abbey
- Spouse: Hedwige de la Rochefoucauld (m. 1919)
- Issue: Princess Isabelle
Names
- Sixtus Ferdinand Maria Ignazio Alfred Robert
- House: House of Bourbon-Parma
- Father: Robert I, Duke of Parma
- Mother: Infanta Maria Antonia of Portugal

Prince Sixtus of Bourbon-Parma (German: Sixtus Ferdinand Maria Ignazio Alfred Robert von Bourbon-Parma; 1 August 1886 – 14 March 1934) was a member of the House of Bourbon-Parma, a Belgian officer in World War I, and the central figure in the Sixtus Affair, an attempt to negotiate a treaty to end Austria-Hungary's participation in the Great War separate from its Central Powers allies. He also wrote a number of books.

== Early life ==
Sixtus was the eldest son of the last Duke of Parma, Robert I and his second wife Infanta Maria Antonia of Portugal, daughter of King Miguel of Portugal. His father had had twelve children from a previous marriage and Sixtus was the fourteenth of Duke Robert's twenty four children. Among the twenty four, he was the sixth son, hence he was named, Sixtus. According to his first cousin Princess Beatrice of Bourbon, Sixtus was destinated to marry his first cousin once removed Archduchess Dolores.

Sixtus' father had been deposed from the Duchy of Parma during the wars of Italian unification, but having inherited the large fortune of his childless uncle, Henri, Count of Chambord, Duke Robert was very wealthy. He raised his large family, alternating their residence between Villa Pianore (a large property located between Pietrasanta and Viareggio) and his Castle Schwarzau, lower Austria. Prince Sixtus was educated at Stella Matutina, a Catholic boarding school for boys run by Jesuits in Feldkirch, near the Swiss border. After finishing high school, he studied law in Paris.

On the death of his father in 1907, the largest part of the family's fortune was inherited by Elias, Duke of Parma, the only healthy son among Sixtus' half-siblings. In 1910, the children of Duke Robert's first wife and those of his second wife reached an agreement dividing their father's assets. The following year, Sixtus's sister, Princess Zita, married Archduke Charles, the heir to the throne of the Austro-Hungarian Empire, who had been Sixtus' childhood friend.

The outbreak of World War I further divided the family. Although their ancestors had reigned in Parma, the brothers had even stronger ties with France and Austria. Unable to fight with the French army, while Prince Sixtus and his brother Prince Xavier of Bourbon-Parma enlisted in the Belgian Army, their brothers Elias, Felix and René fought on the opposite side, in the Austrian Army.

== Sixtus affair ==
In 1917, as the War was dragging on towards its fourth year, Sixtus' brother-in-law, Emperor Charles I, secretly entered into peace negotiations with France using Sixtus as intermediary. The Emperor also enlisted the help of his loyal childhood friend and aide-de-camp Count Tamás Erdődy. Charles initiated contact with Sixtus via neutral Switzerland. Empress Zita wrote a letter inviting her brother to Vienna. Zita and Sixtus's mother, who was living in neutral Switzerland, delivered the letter personally.

Sixtus arrived with French-agreed conditions for talks: the restoration to France of Alsace-Lorraine, annexed by Germany after the Franco-Prussian War in 1870; the restoration of the independence of Belgium; the independence of Serbia and the handover of Constantinople to Russia. Charles agreed, in principle, to the first three points and wrote a letter dated 24 March 1917, to Sixtus giving "the secret and unofficial message that I will use all means and all my personal influence" to the French President.

This attempt at 20th century dynastic diplomacy eventually failed, mainly because of the requirement for Italy to cede Tyrol. Germany also refused to negotiate over Alsace-Lorraine and, seeing a Russian collapse on the horizon, was loath to give up the war. When news of the overture leaked in April 1918, Sixtus's brother-in-law, Charles I of Austria, denied involvement until French Prime Minister Georges Clemenceau published letters signed by him. Austria now became even more dependent on its German ally, and there a sharp rebuke for Charles by Wilhelm II.

The failed attempt of peace negotiations became known as the Sixtus Affair.

== Later life ==
On 12 November 1919, Prince Sixtus of Bourbon-Parma was married to Hedwige de la Rochefoucauld, the daughter of Armand de La Rochefoucauld, Duke de Doudeauville, Duke de Bisaccia and his wife, Princess Louise Radziwill. Together, they had one daughter: Princess Isabella (1922–2015) who married a distant cousin Count Roger de la Rochefoucauld on 23 June 1943. They divorced in 1966. She had five sons and six grandchildren. Hedwige's younger sister, Marie de La Rochefoucauld, married Henri-Antoine-Marie de Noailles, the 11th Prince de Poix. The marriage lacked the authorization of Sixtus's elder half-brother, Elias, Duke of Parma, and was considered non-dynastic.

The peace Treaty of Saint-Germain, gave France the right to confiscate permanently the property of those who had fought in enemy armies during the war. As Sixtus's half-brother, Elias, had served in the Austrian army, the French government expropriated Chambord castle, owned by the Bourbons of Parma. Because Prince Sixtus and his brother Xavier had fought with the Allied side, they took their brother Elias to court demanding a greater share of the family inheritance. They claimed that the former legal agreement was contrary to French law. In 1925, a French court upheld Sixtus and Xavier's claim, but the appeals court overturned the verdict in 1928. The French Court of Cassation upheld it in 1932. The brothers were given an equal share of the estate. However, Chambord was never returned by the French government, which paid compensation to Elias.

Married to a French aristocrat, Prince Sixtus settled in France. In the following years he made several exploratory expeditions to Africa, wrote a number of books (including a biography of his great-great-grandmother Maria Luisa of Spain, Duchess of Lucca) and treatises. He died on 14 March 1934, in Paris from blood poisoning, which he contracted in May 1932 in the Sahara Desert during his last expeditions.

== Publications ==
- In Nordostarabien und Südmesopotamien: Vorbericht über die Forschungsreise 1912, with Alois Musil (Vienna: 1913).
- Le Traité d'Utrecht et les lois fondamentales du royaume (Paris: E. Champion, 1914). Reprinted (Paris: Communication & Tradition, 1998).
- L'offre de paix séparée de l'Autriche, 5 décembre 1916 - 12 octobre 1917 (Paris: Plon, 1920). English translation: Austria's Peace Offer, 1916-1917 (London: Constable, 1921).
- La reine d'Étrurie, Paris, Calmann-Levy, 1928.
- La dernière conquête du roi Alger, 1830 (Paris: Calmann-Lévy, 1930).

== Ancestry ==
Ancestors of Prince Sixtus of Bourbon-Parma

16. Louis I of Etruria
8. Charles II, Duke of Parma
17. Maria Luisa, Duchess of Lucca
4. Charles III, Duke of Parma
18. Victor Emmanuel I of Sardinia
9. Princess Maria Teresa of Savoy
19. Archduchess Maria Theresa of Austria-Este
2. Robert I, Duke of Parma
20. Charles X of France
10. Prince Charles Ferdinand, Duke of Berry
21. Princess Marie Thérèse of Savoy
5. Princess Louise of Artois
22. Francis I of the Two Sicilies
11. Princess Marie Caroline of Naples and Sicily
23. Archduchess Maria Clementina of Austria
1. Prince Sixtus of Bourbon-Parma
24. Peter III of Portugal
12. John VI of Portugal and Brazil
25. Maria I of Portugal and Brazil
6. Miguel I of Portugal
26. Charles IV of Spain
13. Infanta Carlota Joaquina of Spain
27. Princess Maria Luisa of Parma
3. Infanta Maria Antonia of Portugal
28. Charles Thomas, Prince of Löwenstein
14. Constantine, Hereditary Prince of Löwenstein
29. Countess Sophie of Windisch-Graetz
7. Princess Adelaide of Löwenstein
30. Karl Ludwig, Prince of Hohenlohe-Langenburg
15. Princess Agnes of Hohenlohe-Langenburg
31. Countess Amalie Henriette of Solms-Baruth

== In fiction ==
The television series The Young Indiana Jones Chronicles presents Sixtus (played by Benedict Taylor) and his brother Xavier (played by Matthew Wait) as Belgian officers in World War I who help the young Indiana Jones. Sixtus and his brother Xavier and the Sixtus Affair are the central subjects of the historical fiction novel "Kingdoms Fall - The Laxenburg Message" by Edward Parr.

== Sources ==
- encyclopedia.com
