= Infanta Maria Antónia of Portugal =

Titular Duchess of Parma (1862–1959)

Infanta Maria Antonia
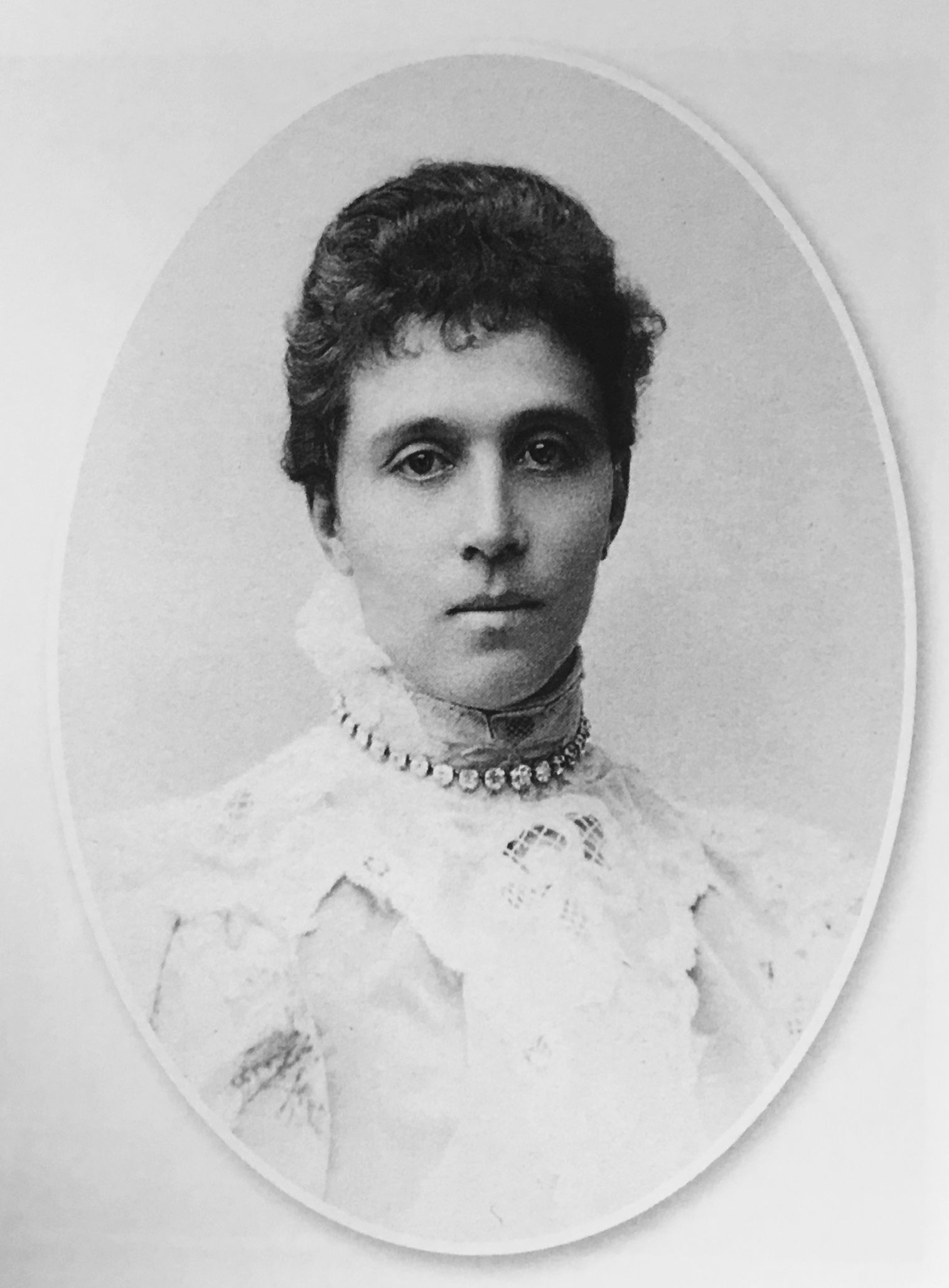
- Maria Antónia in the 1890s

Duchess consort of Parma
- Pretense: 14 January 1884 – 16 November 1907
- Born: 28 November 1862; Bronnbach, Grand Duchy of Baden
- Died: 14 May 1959 (aged 96); Berg Castle, Luxembourg
- Spouse: Robert I, Duke of Parma (m. 1884; died 1907)
- Issue: Princess Maria Adelaide; Prince Sixtus; Xavier, Duke of Parma; Princess Francesca Giuseppa; Zita, Empress of Austria; Felix, Prince consort of Luxembourg; Prince René; Princess Maria Antonia; Princess Isabella; Prince Louis; Princess Henrietta Anna; Prince Gaetano
Names
- Portuguese: Maria Antónia Adelaide Camila Carolina Eulália Leopoldina Sofia Inês Francisca de Assis e de Paula Micaela Rafaela Gabriela Gonzaga Gregória Bernardina Benedita Andrea; French: Marie Antoinette Adélaïde Camille Caroline Eulalie Léopoldine Sophie Agnès Françoise d'Assis et de Pauline Michelle Raphaëlle Gabrielle Gonzage Gregorie Bernardine Bénédicte Andrée
- House: Braganza
- Father: Miguel I of Portugal
- Mother: Adelaide of Löwenstein

Infanta Maria Antónia of Portugal (Portuguese: Maria Antónia Adelaide Camila Carolina Eulália Leopoldina Sofia Inês Francisca de Assis e de Paula Micaela Rafaela Gabriela Gonzaga Gregória Bernardina Benedita Andrea; 28 November 1862 – 14 May 1959) was the seventh and last child of Miguel I of Portugal and Adelaide of Löwenstein.

== Early life ==
She was born in exile as the youngest child of her parents in the Grand Duchy of Baden as her father, Infante Miguel, had been banished from Portugal by his brother, Pedro I of Brazil, after usurping and losing the Portuguese throne in the Liberal Wars.

== Marriage ==
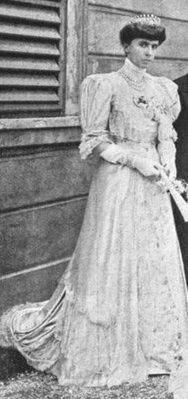
Infanta Maria Antonia of Portugal, Duchess of Parma, 1906.

On 15 October 1884 at Schloss Fischorn, Maria Antonia married Robert I, Duke of Parma as his second wife. They had twelve children. Maria Antonia was widowed when Robert died at Villa Pianore on 16 November 1907. Later on she resided with her daughter Zita while in exile. By 1940, Zita and her family, Maria Antonia and her daughter Isabella were living in reduced circumstances in Quebec. Eventually, after World War II's end, Maria Antonia moved to Berg Castle, Luxembourg where she celebrated her 90th birthday. After lingering for many years, she died there in 1959 aged 96. She was the last surviving grandchild of John VI of Portugal. Many of her children and grandchildren have also lived very long lives.

== Issue ==
- Princess Maria Adelaide of Bourbon-Parma (5 August 1885 – 6 February 1959); she was a Benedictine nun under the religious name of Mother Maria Benedicta of the Benedictine Order of the Sisters of St. Cecile.
- Prince Sixtus of Bourbon-Parma (1 August 1886 – 14 March 1934); he married Duchess Hedwige de La Rochefoucauld on 12 November 1919 and had issue.
- Xavier, Duke of Parma (25 May 1889 – 7 May 1977); he married Countess Madeleine of Bourbon-Busset on 12 November 1927 and had issue.
- Princess Francesca Giuseppa of Bourbon-Parma (22 April 1890 – 7 October 1978); she was a Benedictine nun under the religious name of Mother Scolastica of the Benedictine Order of the Sisters of St. Cecile.
- Princess Zita of Bourbon-Parma (9 May 1892 – 14 March 1989); she married Charles I of Austria on 21 October 1911 and had issue; her cause of canonization was opened in 2009 by Pope Benedict XVI, and is titled Servant of God accordingly.
- Prince Felix of Bourbon-Parma (28 September 1893 – 8 April 1970); he married Charlotte, Grand Duchess of Luxembourg on 6 November 1919 and had issue.
- Prince René of Bourbon-Parma (17 October 1894 – 30 July 1962); he married Princess Margrethe of Denmark on 9 June 1921 and had issue.
- Princess Maria Antonia of Bourbon-Parma (7 November 1895 – 19 October 1977); she was considered as a possible bride for Infante Jaime, Duke of Madrid, but ultimately did not marry him. Then, she was a Benedictine nun under the religious name of Mother Maria Antonia of the Benedictine Order of the Sisters of St. Cecile.
- Princess Isabella Maria of Bourbon-Parma (14 June 1898 – 28 July 1984)
- Prince Louis of Bourbon-Parma (5 December 1899 – 4 December 1967); he married Princess Maria Francesca of Italy on 23 January 1939 and had issue.
- Princess Henrietta Anna of Bourbon-Parma (8 March 1903 – 13 June 1987)
- Prince Gaetano of Bourbon-Parma (11 June 1905 – 9 March 1958); he married Princess Margarete of Thurn and Taxis on 29 April 1931 and had issue. They were divorced on 24 January 1950.

== Ancestry ==
Ancestors of Infanta Maria Antónia of Portugal

8. Peter III of Portugal
4. John VI of Portugal and Brazil
9. Maria I of Portugal and Brazil
2. Miguel I of Portugal
10. Charles IV of Spain
5. Infanta Carlota Joaquina of Spain
11. Princess Maria Luisa of Parma
1. Infanta Maria Antónia of Portugal
12. Charles Thomas, Prince of Löwenstein
6. Constantine, Hereditary Prince of Löwenstein
13. Countess Sophie of Windisch-Graetz
3. Princess Adelaide of Löwenstein
14. Karl Ludwig, Prince of Hohenlohe-Langenburg
7. Princess Agnes of Hohenlohe-Langenburg
15. Countess Amalie Henriette of Solms-Baruth

== See also ==
- Descendants of Miguel I of Portugal

Infanta Maria Antónia of Portugal House of Braganza Cadet branch of the House of Aviz Born: 28 November 1862 Died: 14 May 1959
Titles in pretence
Vacant Title last held by Princess Maria Pia of the Two Sicilies	— TITULAR — Duchess consort of Parma; 14 January 1884 – 16 November 1907; Reason for succession failure: Annexed by Kingdom of Italy	Vacant Title next held by Madeleine de Bourbon-Busset
