= Hagre l'Escot =

Scottish mercenary captain

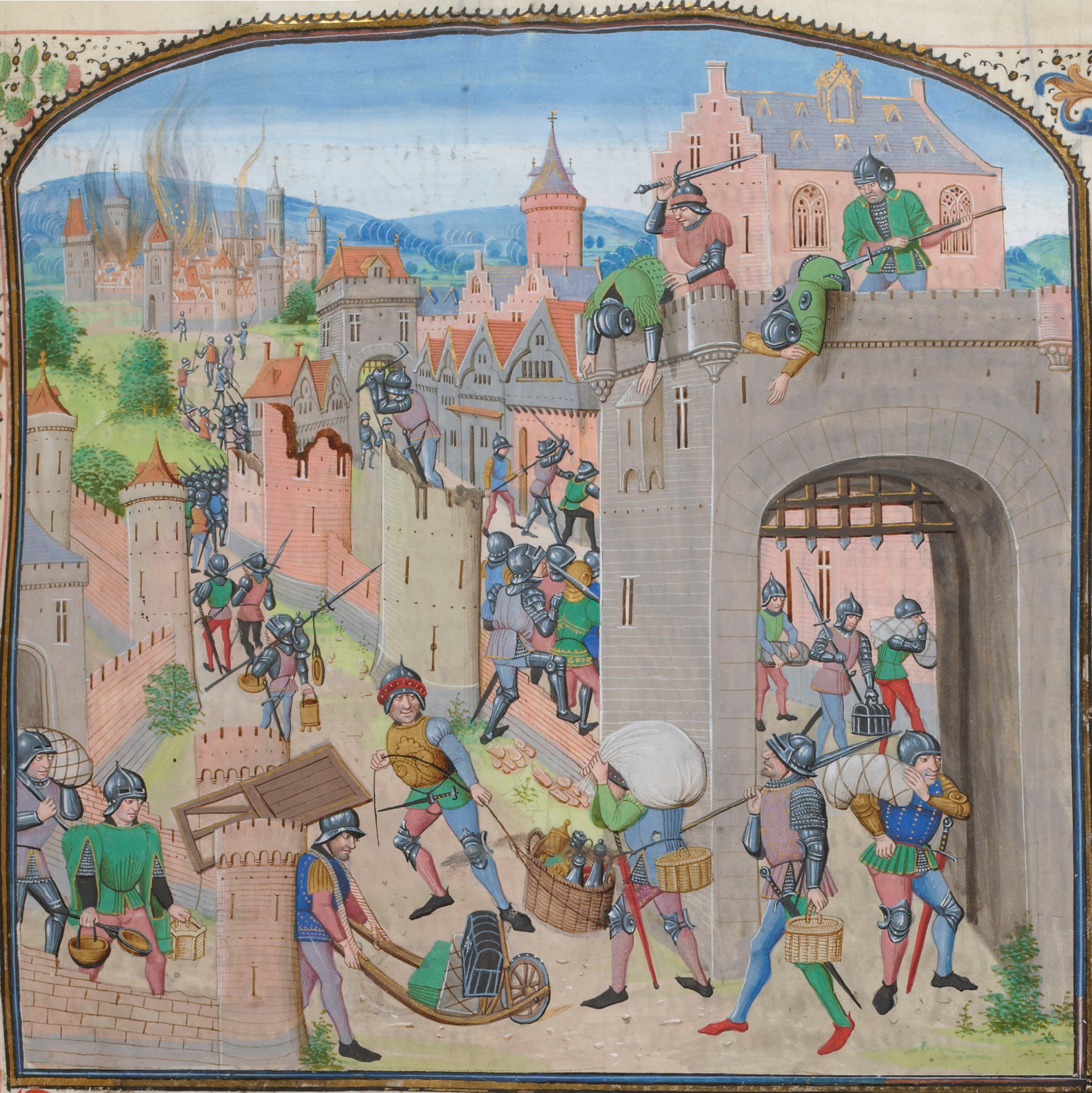
The Tard-Venus pillage Grammont in 1362, from Froissart's Chronicles.

Hagre l'Escot was a Scottish mercenary captain during the Hundred Years War.

He fought for Edward III in 1360, and on the Black Prince's expedition to Castile in 1366.

After the Treaty of Brétigny Hagre and his men found themselves unemployed and so become one of the 30 so-called Tard-Venus bandits, that ranged the French country side pillaging towns. This led Avignon Pope Innocent VI to preach a "crusade against the robbers", and French King John II to "pay off" the brigands with gold to go to Italy.

His story is mentioned in the Chronicles of Froissart which holds that:

Guin de Batefol: he had on his way well two thousand combatants. There were Talebart Talebardon, Guiot du Pin, Espiote, the Petite Meschin, Batillier, Francois Hennequin, de Bourc Camus, the Bourc of L'Espare, Naudon de Bagerent, Bourc de Bretuel, Lamit, Hagre l'Escot, Albrest Ourri the German, Borduel, Bernart de la Salle, Robert Briquet, Carsuelle, Aymon of Ortinge, Garsiot of Chastel, Guionnet of Paux, Hortingo de la Salle and several others. If these Companies advised, about mid-Lent, that they were trailing towards Avignon and would go to see the pope and the cardinals: if they passed and entered and ran in the county of Mâcon; and they came to the county of Forez for this good country and to Lyon on the Rhone.

There is some debate among modern scholars over whether he is or is not identifiable with Thomas Stewart, 2nd Earl of Angus.
