= Bour de Breteuil =

French mercenary captain

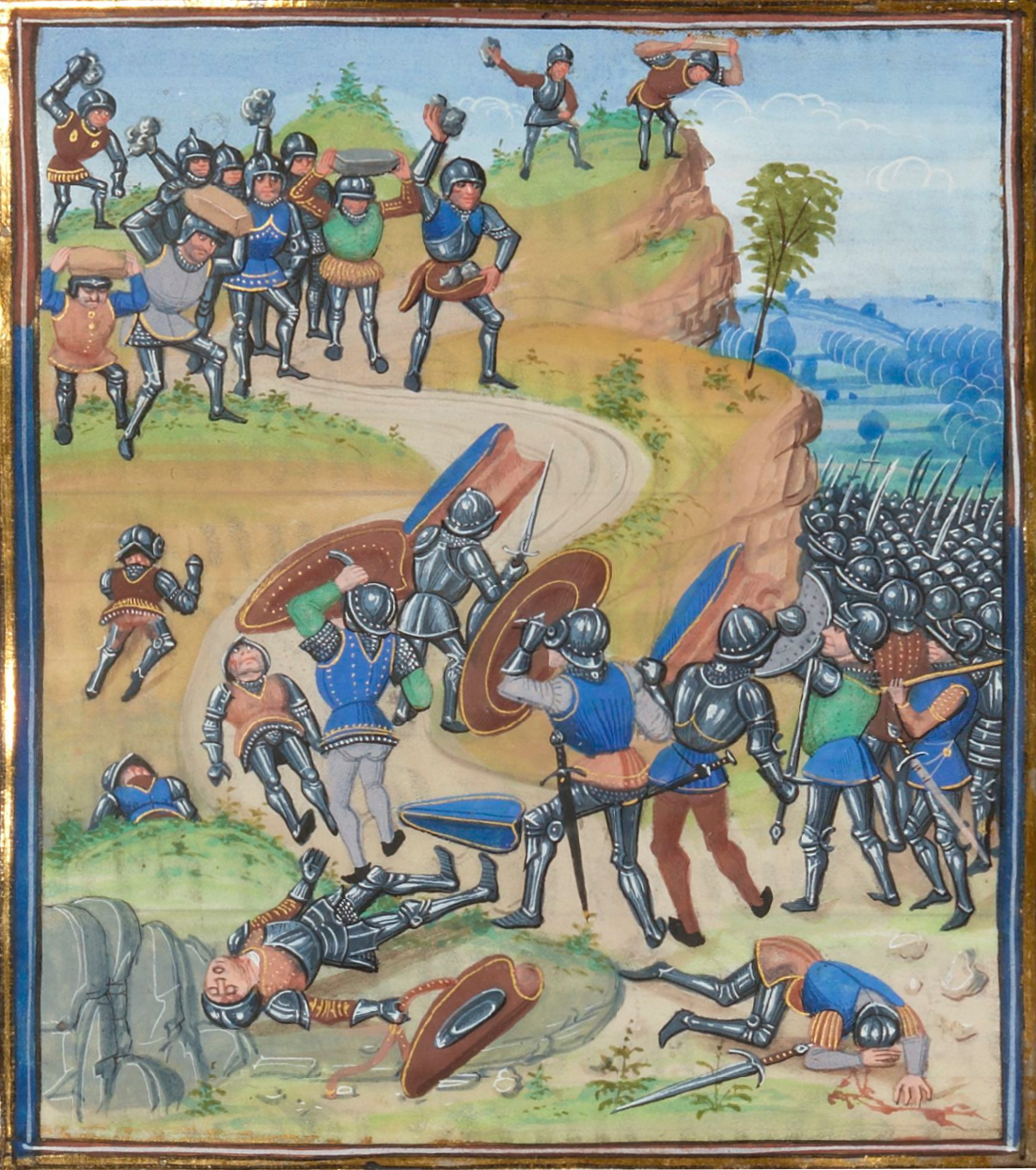
Battle of Brignais

Bour de Breteuil was a mercenary captain of the Hundred Years War.

He was an illegitimate son of the house of Lesparre, from Gironde. The Lesparre were a very powerful noble family in southern France. Due to his station in 13th century society, he became a mercenary captain.

However, after the Treaty of Brétigny was signed on May 8, 1360, he found himself unemployed and so turned to Brigandry, ranging the French country side pillaging towns.

Bour de Breteuil fought at the battle of Brignais (6 April 1362) against the King of France in which a coalition of bandit companies were successful. Like the Bour Camus, he accompanied several of the bandit leaders including John Hawkwood, John Creswey and Robert Briquet, to accept a payment of gold from the king of France to go into Italy, where he gained employ as a mercenary.

== See also ==
- Lesparre Castle
