= Bascot de Mauléon =

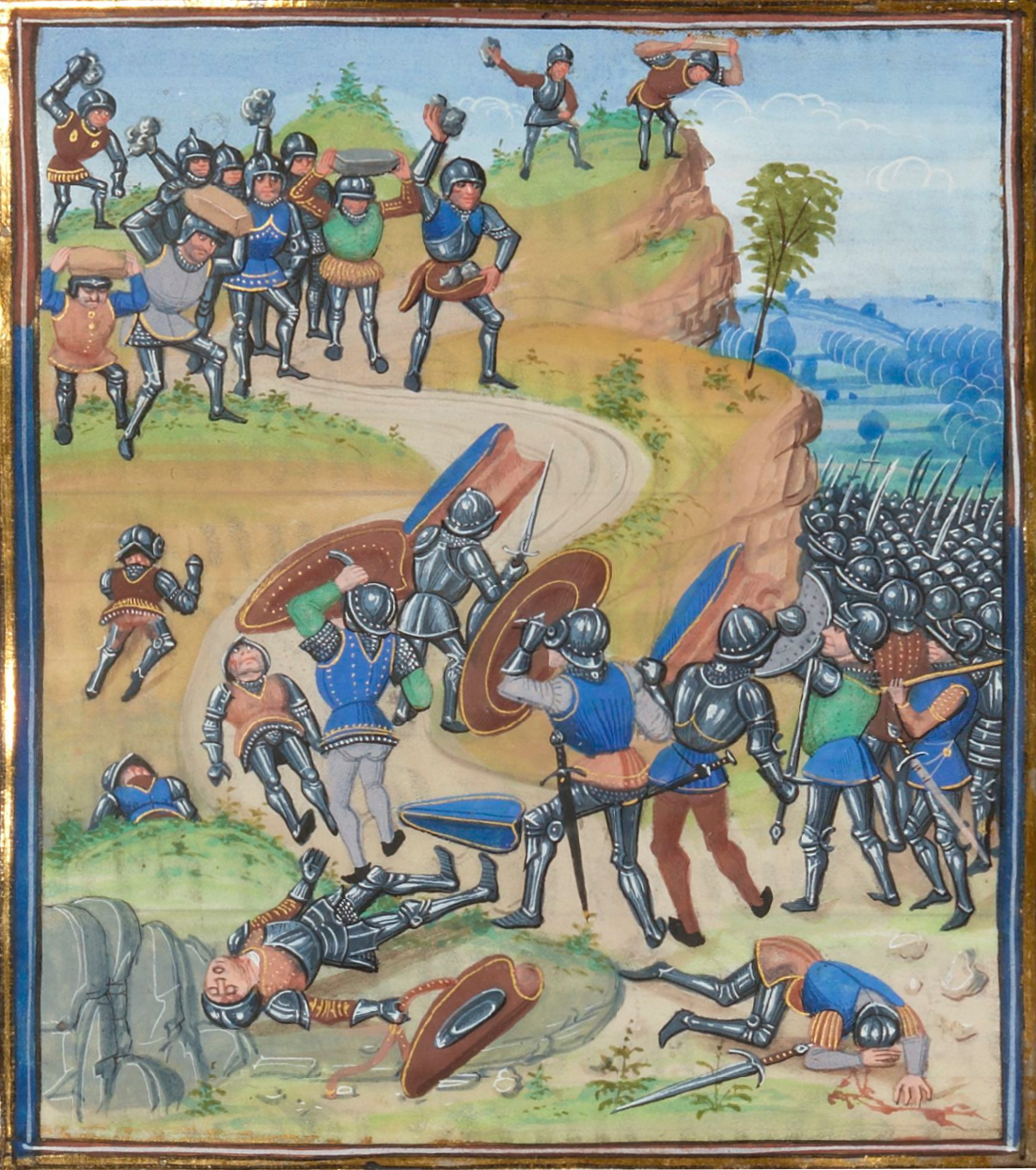
Battle of Brigniais

Bascot de Mauléon was a Basque soldier, mercenary and Brigand of the Hundred Years' War in the 14th century.

In 1363, after the Treaty of Brétigny, Bascot de Mauléon and his men began to pillage the countryside. His was one of the many so called Tard-Venus, groups of mercenaries left without employment by the end of hostilities.

His troops attacked Avignon and ransomed the Pope. They then plundered Burgundy. He took part in the Battle of Brignais where troops raised by the king were routed due to the betrayal of the Archpriest.

Froissart's Chronicles recount that Mauleón had an intimate relationship with a woman in Anse, but that another bandit leader named Limousin also won the favors of that beautiful woman. Mauleón attacked the town of Anse, catching Limousin with his consort and forcing Limousin to flee naked. In retaliation Limousin killed Bascot de Mauleón in an ambush on May 2, 1365.
