= Francois Hennequin =

Mercenary captain

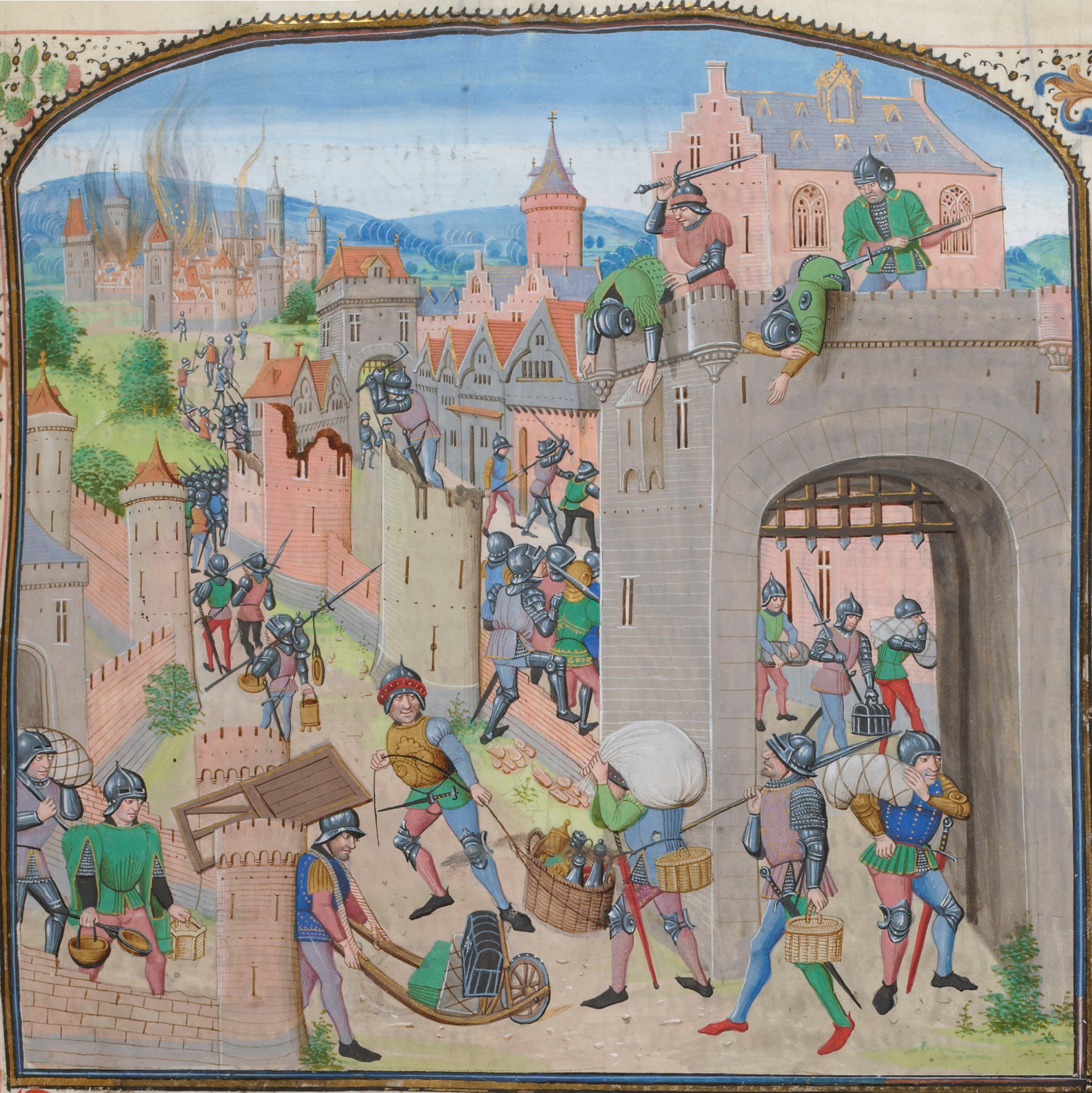
The Tard-Venus pillage Grammont in 1362, from Froissart's Chronicles.

Francois Hennequin, was a mercenary captain during the Hundred Years War.

== Career ==
Frank Hennequin was of German origin.

He was garrisoned at Carhaix on behalf of John of Montfort.

There is a story that Saint Charles cured him at Guingamp of general paralysis and so Hennequin in recognition of this miracle performed a barefoot pilgrimage to the church of the Friars Minor in Guingamp. However, while there he got into a duel when someone at the Guingamp denied the sanctity of St Charles.

After the Treaty of Brétigny in the Hundred Years War, Hennequin and his men found themselves unemployed and so become one of the 30 so-called Tard-Venus bandits, that ranged the French country side pillaging town. Leading to Avignon, Pope Innocent VI preaching a crusade against the robbers.

His story is mentioned in the Chronicles of Froissart which told:

Guin de Batefol: he had on his way well two thousand combatants.... these Companies advised, about mid-Lent, that they were trailing towards Avignon and would go to see the pope and the cardinals: if they passed and entered and ran in the county of Mâoon; and they came to the county of Forez for this good country and to Lyon on the Rhone.

In mid-Lent 1362 his group, in company with up to 2000 other Tard-Venus troops turned towards the rich papal, but largely undefended city of Avignon attacking the county of Macon, Lyon and Forez on the way. They eventually occupy the priory of Estivareilles and put to looting the district. Seguin Badefol took hostages for ransom in Macon County.

Then mid—year Francois Hennequin, Naudon de Bageran, Espiote, Creswey, Robert Briquet, and Camus bour, separated from the main group and marched on Avignon to make ransom of the Pope and cardinals.

But on 3 June 1362, this army was cut to pieces by 400 Spaniards and Castilians soldiers under the orders of Henry of Trastamara (King of Castile and Leon) at Montpensier.
