= Tard-Venus =

Medieval free company

Tard-Venus (French, "latecomers") were medieval groups of routiers (mercenaries or bandits) that ravaged Europe in the later years of the reign of King John II of France.

== History ==
When the Treaty of Brétigny was signed May 8, 1360, the peace that resulted left many soldiers and those who provided services to the armies without employment. While the King of England evacuated his forces from France and paid them, some captains of the garrisons, knights and squires left to find employment as mercenaries for the King of Navarre. Additionally the German mercenaries, as well as mercenaries and adventurers from Brabant, Gascony, Flanders, Hainault, Brittany and France, were left to fend for themselves. Dismissed, they formed bands and began to pillage.

In Champagne, they captured the castle of Joinville, seizing a considerable amount of booty for ransom. They roamed and looted the Champagne region and devastated the bishoprics of Langres, Toul and Verdun, and then penetrated Burgundy supported by some Burgundian knights and squires.

After settling around Besançon, Dijon and Beaune, they took and plundered Vergy, Gevrey-in-Beaune and ravaged the region.

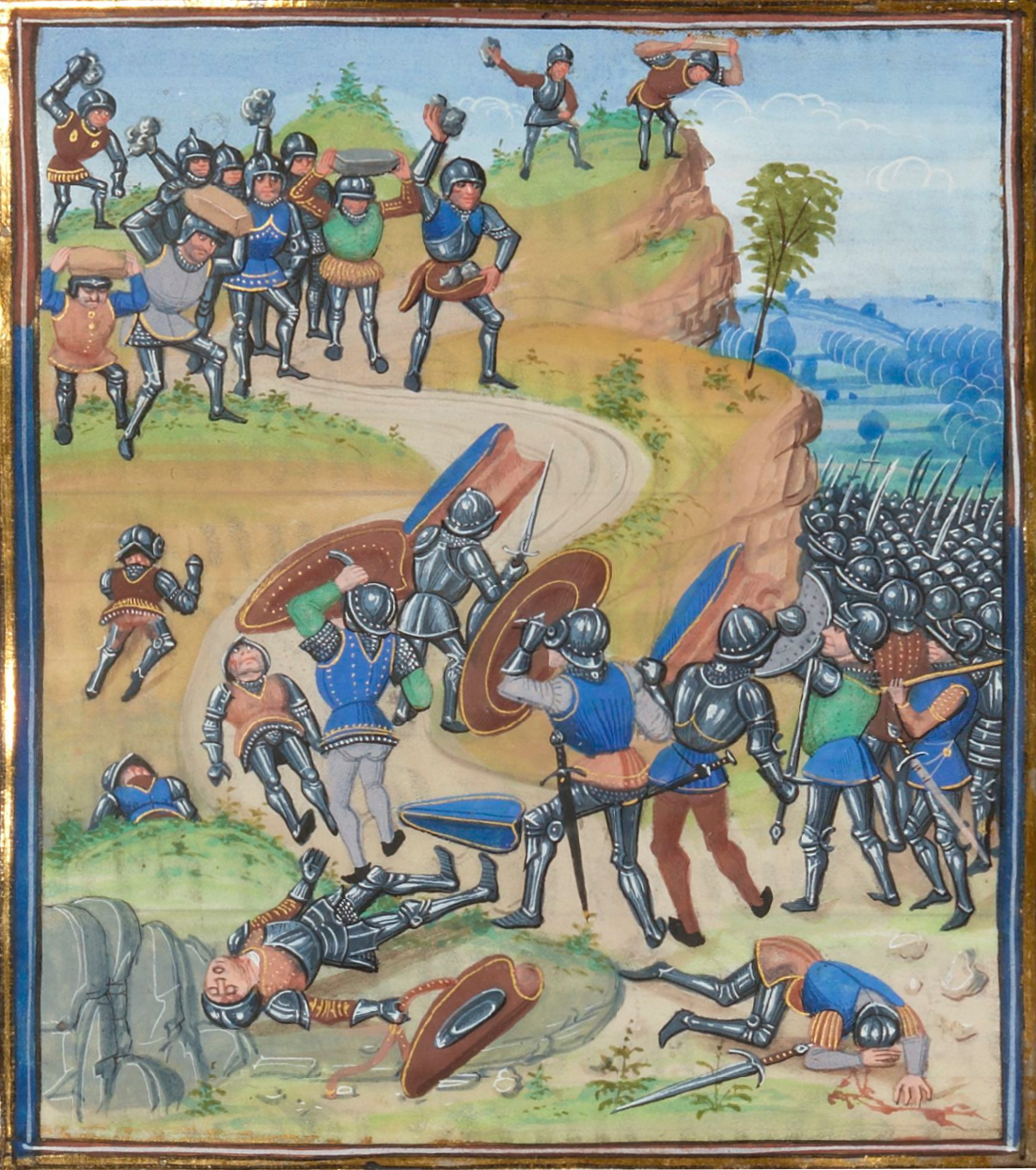
Battle of Brignais (1362)

In all there may have been 15,000 men in these groups. The most powerful captains included:

- Seguin de Badefol (1330-1366), at the head of 2,000 mercenaries, excommunicated by the Pope in 1365, later served King Charles II of Navarre.
- Talbart Talbardon, squire of the Duke of Burgundy Philip the Bold in 1363.
- Guiot du Pin.
- Frank Hennequin, has German origin, served John of Montfort, performed at pilgrimage to Guingamp after cured by Saint Charles of Blois-Châtillon.
- Camus Bour, also known as Camus the Bastard, has Navarese or Gascon origin, joined the White Company to Italy after the Battle of Brignais, captured in 1367 at Beauvoir.
- Bour Lesparre.
- Bour de Breteuil, illegitimate son of the noble House of Lesparre, joined the White Company to Italy after the Battle of Brignais.
- Naudon de Bageran.
- Lamit.
- Hagre l'Escot, a Scottish mercenary captain, fought for King Edward III of England in 1360 and joined the campaign of Edward, the Black Prince to Castille in 1366.
- Ourri the German.
- Bernard de la Salle, a French mercenary captain, served Captal de Buch Jean III de Grailly in 1359, captured and took hostage Isabella, Duchess consort of Bourbon in 1369 until King Charles V paid ransom for her release in 1372.
- Robert Briquet (-1368), an English captain of the Great Company led by Bertrand du Guesclin, was present at the Battle of Najera.
- Amanieu Ortigue Garciot Castel.
- Guyonnet Pau.
- Bascot de Mauléon, a Basque brigand, attacked Avignon and ransomed the Pope. According to Jean Froissart, he attacked a bandit leader who is also in favour of his lady love, but he was ambushed in 1365.
- Petit Meschin, a French brigand, taken prisoner in 1368.

In mid-Lent all these groups turned towards the rich papal city of Avignon, attacking the county of Macon, Lyon and Forez on the way. They occupied the priory of Estivareilles.

After their victory, the bands turned to looting the district. Seguin Badefol, with 3000 fighters, took hostages for ransom in Macon County. Other gang leaders such as Naudon de Bageran, Espiote, John Creswey, Robert Briquet, and Camus Bour, marched on Avignon to kidnap the Pope and cardinals.

On 3 June 1362, this army was defeated by 400 Spaniard and Castilian soldiers under the orders of Henry of Trastamara at Montpensier. Learning of that defeat the other bands fled to the fortress of Pont-Saint-Esprit, where they found immense wealth and occupied a strategic crossroads. At the news of the capture of Pont-Saint-Esprit, many bands in Champagne moved into the Rhone valley.

With starvation beginning to take in Avignon, Pope Innocent VI preached a crusade against the robbers, but failing to pay these Crusaders make many of them returned home, but some joined the ranks of the bandits.

The complete failure of the crusade forced Pope Innocent VI to give to French King John II, 60,000 gold florins to pay off the brigands and take them to Italy. Key leaders of the band enlist to serve Galeazzo II Visconti and Bernabo Visconti, lords of Milan.

Seguin de Badefol holding the city of Anse, refused to go to Italy and continued to pillage for more than a year before retiring with his treasures to Gascony, his native country. Later he served King Charles II of Navarre, where he died by poison figs.
