= Aymon of Ortinge =

14th-century French mercenary commander

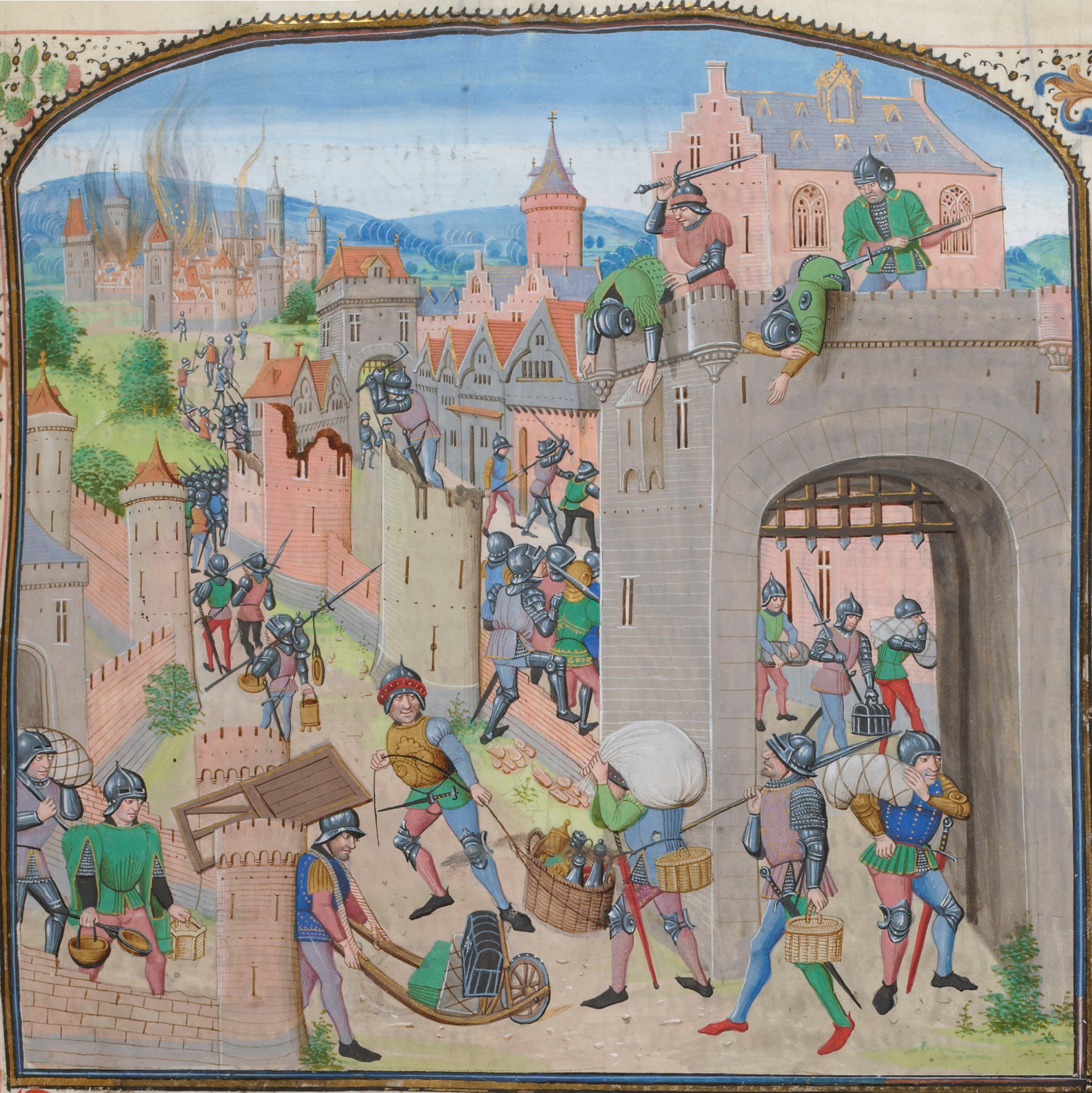
The Tard-Venus pillage Grammont in 1362, from Froissart's Chronicles

Aymon of Ortinge, also known as Amanieu d'Ortigue or Amanieu de l'Artigue, was a French mercenary captain during the Hundred Years' War. His story is mentioned in the Chronicles of Froissart.

He was an adventurer of Gascony origins, perhaps from the hamlet of Ortigues in the commune of Cézac.

After the Treaty of Brétigny, Hagre and his men found themselves unemployed and so they joined the 30 so-called Tard-Venus bandit groups, that ranged the French countryside pillaging towns.

On May 11, 1369, Louis Duke of Anjou had Amanieu d'Ortigue, Noli Pavalhon and Guyonnet de Pau, beheaded and quartered, because they had conspired with the bandits Le Petit Meschin and Perrin de Savoie, to deliver the duke to the English.
