= Naudon de Bageran =

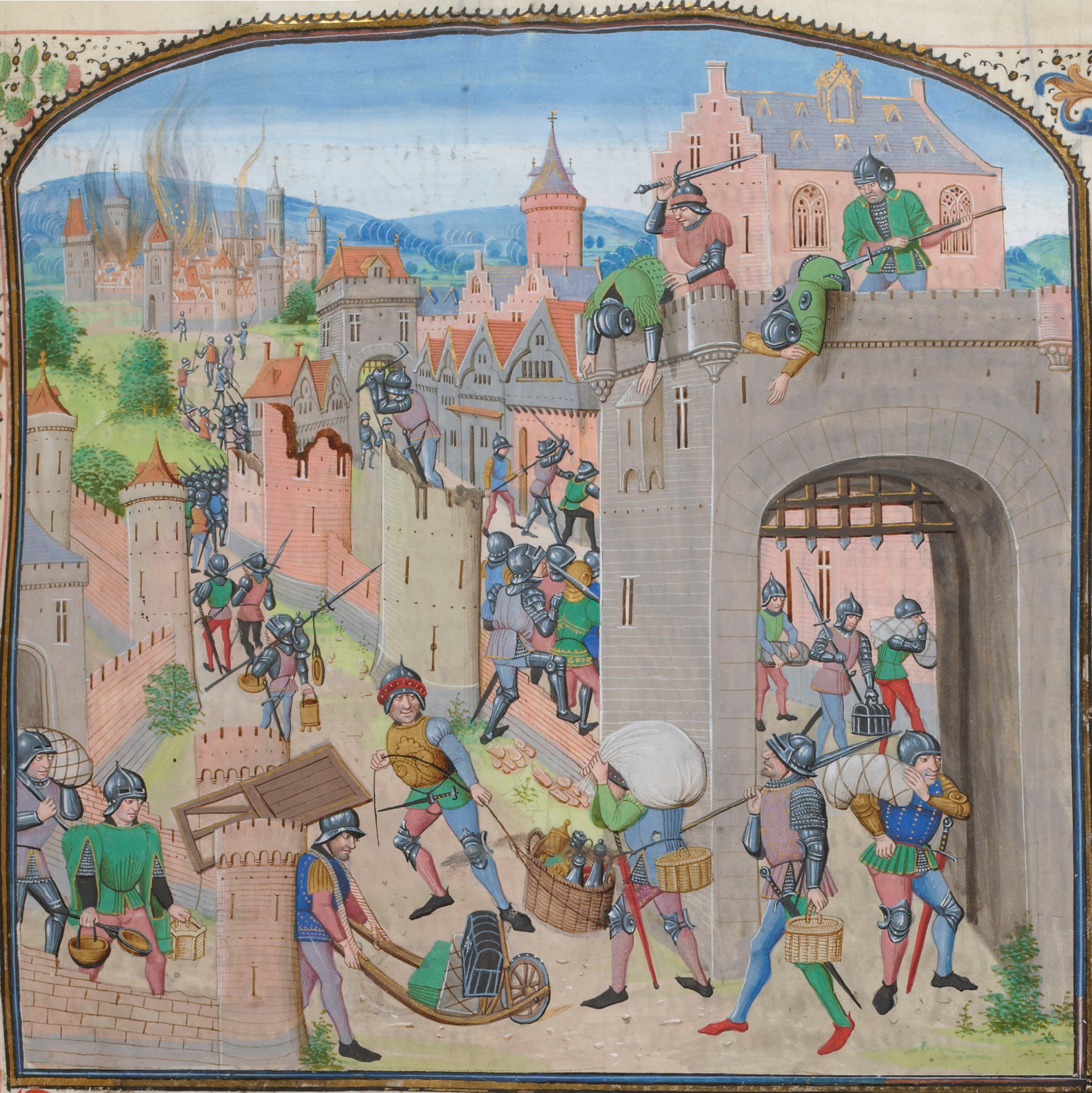
The Tard-Venus pillage Grammont in 1362, from Froissart's Chronicles.

Naudon de Bageran was a mercenary captain during the Hundred Years War.

At the end of hostilities during the Hundred Years War Naudon de Bageran and his men found themselves unemployed and so became one of the 30 so-called Tard-Venus bandits, that ranged the French countryside pillaging towns. Leading to Avignon, Pope Innocent VI preaching a crusade against the robbers.

His story is mentioned in the Chronicles of Froissart In mid-Lent 1362 his group, in company with up to 2000 other Tard-Venus Naudon de Bageran were attacking the counties of Macon, Lyon and Forez and took hostages for ransom in Macon County.

Then mid, year Naudon de Bageran with Francois Hennequin, Espiote, John Creswey, Robert Briquet, and Camus bour, separated from the main group of brigands and marched on the wealthy and largely undefended papal city of Avignon to make ransom of the Pope and cardinals.

But on 3 June 1362, this army was cut to pieces by 400 Spaniard and Castilian soldiers under the orders of Henry of Trastamara, King of Castile and León at Montpensier.
