= John Creswey =

English mercenary captain

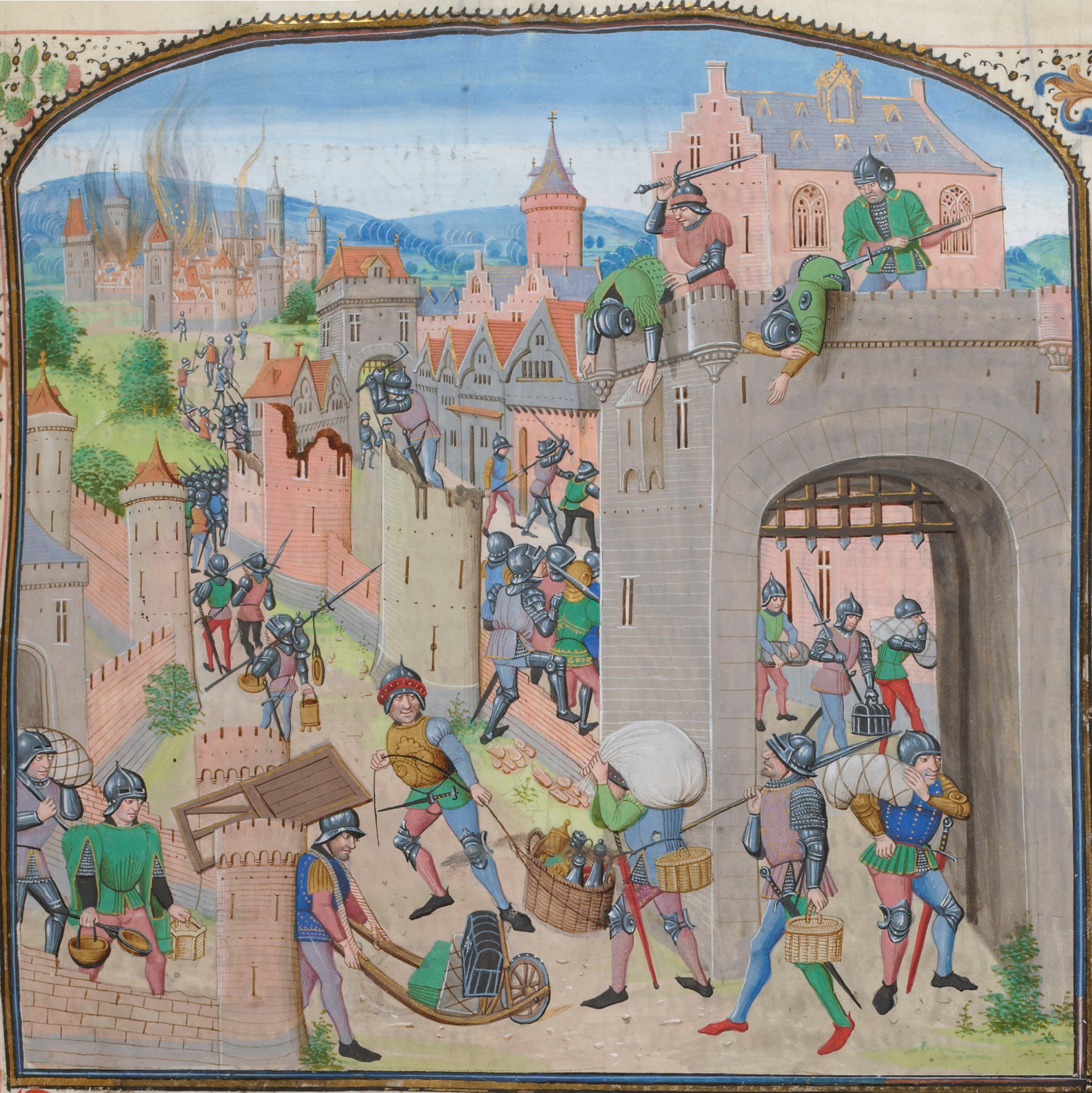
The Tard-Venus pillage Grammont in 1362, from Froissart's Chronicles.

John Creswey was an English mercenary captain during the Hundred Years War.

At the end of hostilities during the Hundred Years War, Creswey and his men found themselves unemployed and so become one of the 30 so-called Tard-Venus bands of bandits, that ranged the French country side pillaging towns. This resulted in Avignon Pope Innocent VI preaching a crusade against the robbers.

After pillaging the counties of Macon, Lyon and Forez through the season of Lent, in the midyear, Creswey joined Naudon de Bageran, Francois Hennequin, Espiote, Robert Briquet, and Camus Bour, and marched on the wealthy and largely undefended papal city of Avignon to attempt to hold the Pope and cardinals hostage.

On 3 June 1362, this army was cut to pieces by 400 Spaniard and Castilians soldiers under the orders of Henry of Trastamara (King of Castile and León) at Montpensier.

His story is mentioned in the Chronicles of Froissart.
