= Timeline (2003 film) =

2003 film by Richard Donner

- Theatrical release poster
- Directed by: Richard Donner
- Screenplay by: Jeff Maguire; George Nolfi
- Based on: Timeline (1999 novel) by Michael Crichton
- Produced by: Lauren Shuler Donner; Jim Van Wyck; Richard Donner
- Starring: Paul Walker; Frances O'Connor; Gerard Butler; Billy Connolly
- Cinematography: Caleb Deschanel
- Edited by: Richard Marks
- Music by: Brian Tyler
- Production companies: Mutual Film Company; Cobalt Media Group; Donners' Company; Artists Production Group
- Distributed by: Paramount Pictures (North America and select international territories); Entertainment Film Distributors (United Kingdom); Cobalt Media Group (International)
- Release date: November 26, 2003 (United States)
- Running time: 115 minutes
- Countries: United States; United Kingdom
- Languages: English; French
- Budget: $80 million
- Box office: $43.9 million

Timeline is a 2003 historical science-fiction adventure film directed and produced by Richard Donner and starring Paul Walker, Frances O'Connor, Gerard Butler, Billy Connolly, David Thewlis, and Anna Friel. Based on Michael Crichton's 1999 novel, the film concerns present-day archaeology and history students who are sent back in time to medieval France to rescue their professor from the middle of a battle.

The film was released by Paramount Pictures on November 26, 2003. It was poorly received by critics, and was a box-office bomb, losing an estimated $49 million.

== Plot ==
Castlegard, a village near La Roque Castle in Dordogne, France, is the site of the 1357 hanging of Lady Claire, sister to Arnaut de Cervole. Her martyrdom led France to win the Hundred Years War against the English. While excavating a nearby monastery, an archaeological team finds a sarcophagus containing the remains of a French knight with a lopped ear, holding the hand of his lady, an unheard-of practice for the time.

Professor Edward Johnston, the team's leader, travels to New Mexico to the headquarters of the ITC Corporation, his project's sponsor, to learn if they have tampered with the site. Johnston's students Kate Erickson, Josh Stern, and François Dontelle, along with Scottish archaeologist André Marek; and Professor Johnston's son Chris, discover a lens from Johnston's bifocals and a note begging for help, although both date over 600 years old. ITC later invites them to its headquarters.

In the process of developing teleportation technology, ITC locked onto a stable wormhole to 1357 Castlegard. Johnston was invited to see the past for himself, but his group has not returned, and ITC wants Marek and company to go back in time to locate him. ITC vice-president Steven Kramer revealed that the device they built was meant to teleport items to certain locations, but came across a wormhole that leads only to 1357 Castlegard. All but Josh volunteer to go.

The volunteers are stripped of all modern technology save for markers they can use to initiate their return. They are joined by a security team including ITC's head of security, Frank Gordon, who recently recovered the body of a teammate named Taub, and two former Marines. On arrival in 1357, the team appears in the path of a young woman chased by English knights; the 2 security men are killed while protecting the group, although one activates his marker after priming a grenade. When his body arrives in the present, the grenade detonates and shatters much of the teleportation device. Josh aids Kramer in making repairs in order for the team to return as they had less than 6 hours.

The team evades the knights, and the woman leads them to the English-controlled Castlegard. They are captured and brought before Lord Oliver de Vannes and his second-in-command, William DeKere. When interrogated and discovered to speak the English tongue, the team members claim to be Scottish. After hearing Dontelle's dialect, De Vannes kills François, believing him to be a French spy. The others are imprisoned in the attic along with Johnston, who previously promised de Vannes that he could make Greek fire for the English in exchange for his life. They escape but are pursued by the English while Marek help the woman break away. Marek is lead to the French forces and the woman reveals herself as Lady Claire and meets her brother, Sir Arnaut de Cervole. Marek soon believed he changed history by saving Claire.

Arnaut provides Marek with a weapon and a horse to find his friends. The English ambush Arnaut and his men but the French prevail, while Marek is recaptured. Chris, Edward, Kate, and Frank are discovered by DeKeres' men and soon realize their markers are not activating. Edward and Frank are recaptured while Chris and Kate once again evade the English. As Edward, Frank, and an unconscious Merek are in his possession, DeKere reveals himself to Gordon and Johnston as former ITC employee William Decker; he had frequently used the teleportation device but was not told by ITC that each use damaged his DNA until it was too late, at which point he would die on a return trip. He plans revenge on ITC and kills Gordon. De Vannes orders his knights to march on LaRoque castle while torching Castlegard, and DeKere brings Johnston and Marek along.

Kate and Chris arrive at the future archaeological site to find it was a monastery, and with the help of the monks, they find a secret passage that leads to La Roque. As the battle commenced, the monks alert de Cervole, who arrives with some soldiers for the surprise attack. Kate and Chris help to swing the upcoming battle in the French's favor by leading de Cervole's men through the monastery tunnels and into the castle.

During the battle, the Greek Fire is tested and Claire is captured and set to hang. Refusing to allow this, Marek blows up the laboratory where the Greek Fire was made, distracting the English, and frees Johnston, while Chris helps de Cervole defeat de Vannes. Enraged, DeKere slashes off Marek's earlobe, and Marek realizes that he is destined to be the knight in the sarcophagus. Marek defeats DeKere, recovers the markers, gives them to the others, and says his goodbyes while running off to help the French assure victory and restore history.

In the present, Josh and Kramer finish the repairs. ITC president Robert Doniger, who tried to sabotage their attempts, fears that when the students' stories become public, ITC will suffer financially. He accidentally injures Kramer. As the machine activates, Doniger races into it, attempting to block the teleportation, but instead is sent back to 1357 with no marker or way of returning, where he arrives outside the castle and is presumably killed by a charging knight.

Chris, Kate, and Johnston safely return while Marek chooses to stay behind. Later, the team returns to the Castlegard ruins, re-examines the sarcophagus, and finds that Marek and Lady Claire married after the war and had three children: Christophe, Katherine, and François. In the inscription, Marek reassures his 20th-Century friends that "I have chosen a wonderful life.".

== Cast ==
- Paul Walker as Chris Johnston
- Frances O'Connor as Kate Ericson
- Gerard Butler as Andre Marek
- Billy Connolly as Professor Edward Johnston
- David Thewlis as Robert Doniger
- Anna Friel as Lady Claire
- Neal McDonough as Frank Gordon
- Matt Craven as Steven Kramer
- Ethan Embry as Josh Stern
- Michael Sheen as Lord Oliver de Vannes
- Lambert Wilson as Lord Arnaut
- Marton Csokas as William "De Kere" Decker
- Rossif Sutherland as François Dontelle
- Steve Kahan as Baker
- David La Haye as Arnaut's Deputy
- Patrick Sabongui as Jimmy Gomez
- Vlasta Vrana as Monk
- Bruce Ramsay as ITC Tech
- Cas Anvar, Stephanie Biddle, and Lynne Adams as E.R. Doctors

== Production ==
Most of the film was shot in Quebec, Canada, with a medieval castle and village set built near Terrebonne. Additional scenes were filmed in Prague and Los Angeles. The battle sequences used medieval reenactors. Richard Donner limited the use of CGI in the film as much as possible.

=== Music ===
Composer Jerry Goldsmith, who had previously collaborated with Donner on The Omen, completed a score for the film – the last score he worked on before his death in July 2004 (his last score used in a film was for the 2003 film Looney Tunes: Back in Action) – but it was replaced by a different score composed by Brian Tyler after Donner was forced to re-cut the film at the insistence of Sherry Lansing, the then-head of Paramount Pictures, and Goldsmith's increasing health problems prevented him from continuing. Both Goldsmith and Tyler's scores were released on CD.

== Reception ==
=== Box office ===
In the United States and Canada, Timeline grossed $19.5 million, with $24.4 million in other territories, for a worldwide total of $43.9 million, against a budget of $80 million. It opened at No. 12, then rose to No. 8 in its second week – its only week in the Top 10 at the domestic box office. In 2018, Newsweek included it in an article about box office bombs.

=== Critical response ===
On the review aggregator website Rotten Tomatoes, 13% of 141 critics' reviews are positive, with an average rating of 3.9/10. The website's consensus reads: "This incoherently plotted addition to the time-travel genre looks and sounds cheesy." Metacritic, which uses a weighted average, assigned the film a score of 29 out of 100, based on 32 critics, indicating "generally unfavorable" reviews. Audiences surveyed by CinemaScore gave the film a grade C+ on a scale of A to F.

Kirk Honeycutt of The Hollywood Reporter called it "[g]lorious so-bad-it's-good entertainment." Roger Ebert gave it 2 stars out of 4, and wrote that it was "not so much about travel between the past and the present as about travel between two movie genres" namely "a corporate thriller crossed with a medieval swashbuckler". He was disappointed that the elaborate premise was not put to greater use, that it was essentially nothing more than a frame for action scenes. Stephen Holden of The New York Times gave the film a one out of five review and noticed that "the clumsy, wooden, screen adaptation of Michael Crichton's novel Timeline suggests a particularly wretched episode of Star Trek tricked out with fancy fireworks and weighed down with a score that grinds away like a cement mixer." Robert Koehler of Variety wrote: "Lacks the consistent tone, pace and point of view for either a science fiction thriller or medieval war adventure."
