= Timeline (novel) =

1999 novel by Michael Crichton

- First edition cover
- Author: Michael Crichton
- Cover artist: Chip Kidd
- Language: English
- Genre: Science fiction, historical fiction, time travel
- Publisher: Alfred A. Knopf
- Publication date: November 1999
- Publication place: United States
- Media type: Print (hardcover)
- Pages: 464
- ISBN: 0679444815
- OCLC: 39348527
- Dewey Decimal: 813/.54 21
- LC Class: PS3553.R48 T56 1999
- Preceded by: Airframe
- Followed by: Prey

Timeline is a science fiction novel by American writer Michael Crichton, his twelfth under his own name and twenty-second overall, published in November 1999. It tells the story of a group of history students who travel to 14th-century France to rescue their professor. The book follows in Crichton's long history of combining science, technical details, and action in his books, this time addressing quantum and multiverse theory.

The novel spawned Timeline Computer Entertainment, a computer game developer that created the Timeline PC game published by Eidos Interactive in 2000. Additionally, a film based on the book was released in 2003.

== Plot ==
In northern Arizona near Corazón Canyon, a married couple driving through the desert encounter an elderly man. They take him to a hospital in Gallup, New Mexico. Hospital staff learn that he works for the company ITC. After he dies, an MRI scan reveals inexplicable abnormalities in his blood vessels.

In the Dordogne region of southwest France, Professor Edward Johnston leads a group of archaeologists and historians as they study a site that includes the fourteenth-century towns of Castelgard and La Roque. Suspicious of the detailed knowledge of the site shown by their funds provider ITC, Johnston travels to New Mexico to investigate. During his absence, the researchers discover the lens to Johnston's eyeglasses in the ruins, and a written message from him that is determined to be over 600 years old. Four of the researchers—graduate students Chris Hughes and Kate Erickson, assistant professor André Marek, and technology specialist David Stern—are flown to ITC's research headquarters in Black Rock, New Mexico.

During the flight, ITC vice president John Gordon informs them that Johnston traveled to the year 1357 using their undisclosed quantum technology. The historians decide to venture into the past to rescue Johnston. Stern chooses to stay behind because the time period is extremely dangerous.

Chris, Kate, Marek and two ITC guards travel to 1357. After arriving, they are attacked by knights chasing a boy. The ITC guards are killed, and one activates a grenade before being fatally wounded and initiates his return, causing the present-day transit pad to be damaged by the explosion. Stern and the ITC employees struggle to repair it so the team can return home.

Kate and Marek find Johnston at a monastery, but he is soon taken captive by the soldiers of Lord Oliver de Vannes, an English knight and resident lord of Castelgard, who thinks that Johnston knows the secret passageway to the otherwise impregnable castle of La Roque, which Oliver controls. Oliver's enemy, French commander Arnaut de Cervole, plans to attack Oliver's domain, and Oliver wants the secret to defend it.

Separated from the others, Chris follows the boy and inadvertently identifies himself as a nobleman. The "boy" leads Chris to the castle of Castelgard, and is revealed to be Lady Claire d'Eltham in disguise. She is being pressured to marry Sir Guy de Malegant. Chris and Marek (who has since found Chris) are challenged to a joust by Guy: Chris's apparent nobility and him accompanying Lady Claire have turned him into the enemy of Guy. The two survive the challenge thanks to Marek's knowledge of medieval combat.

Oliver orders the historians' imprisonment. They escape Castelgard and are pursued by Sir Robert de Kere, Oliver's advisor. Meanwhile, Oliver relocates to La Roque, taking Johnston with him. To rescue Johnston, the historians search for clues to the location of the secret passage to La Roque. After gathering information at the monastery, they find a clue in a water mill, but get captured and interrogated by Arnaut. After escaping Arnaut's forces, Chris and Kate find the entrance to the passage at a decrepit chapel while Marek gains entry into La Roque by posing as Johnston's assistant. Marek learns that Johnston is helping Oliver build an incendiary weapon to use against Arnaut's forces, believing that Oliver will lose the siege anyway as he historically does.

The historians have learned that another person from the present is helping Oliver's forces. The person is revealed to be de Kere, who is really Rob Deckard, an ITC employee driven insane from errors in the process of teleporting to another time that built up in his body over multiple trips, much like the elderly man the couple in Arizona found. Deckard plans to prevent the historians' return to the present and kill them.

Chris and Kate use the passage to enter La Roque. Arnaut begins the siege of La Roque, and enters the castle by apparently using the passage. During the battle, Kate is chased by Guy and sends him falling to his death. Marek and Chris free Johnston from a dungeon. Arnaut swordfights with Oliver, who ends up being trapped in a pit of putrid water. As the historians flee, Chris is attacked by Deckard, but kills him by setting him on fire with Johnston's incendiary weapon.

Stern and the ITC employees repair the transit pad just in time for the historians' return. Marek, who always wanted to live in the Middle Ages, decides to stay behind, while Chris, Kate, and Johnston return to the present.

The historians and Gordon confront ITC president Robert Doniger, who had little concern for the travelers' safety and intends to exploit the quantum technology for corporate gain. Gordon renders him unconscious and sends him to 1348 Europe, during the Black Death.

Chris and Kate are later implied to become a couple, and Kate becomes pregnant. While examining a site in England, the researchers find the graves of Marek and Lady Claire, whom Marek married. Despite knowing that Marek had a happy life, they miss him.

== Reception ==
Entertainment Weekly calls Timeline "exhilarating entertainment," and Cahners Business Information says the book will "grab teens' attention from the very first page".

The novel has also grasped the attention of scholars of medievalism. Crichton named Norman Cantor's Inventing the Middle Ages (1989) as a central influence on his characterization of academic research on the medieval past. According to Richard Utz, Crichton's narrative seems to support Cantor's notion that the work of academic medievalists amounts to little more than subjective reinventions of the medieval era.

== Film adaptation ==
Paramount Pictures produced a feature film adaptation, with a budget of $80 million, released on November 26, 2003. The adaptation was written by Jeff Maguire and George Nolfi, and directed by Richard Donner, and stars Paul Walker as Chris, Gerard Butler as Marek, Billy Connolly as Professor Johnston, and Frances O'Connor as Kate. The film was poorly received by critics and audiences.

== See also ==
- Hundred Years War
