= Seguin de Badefol =

- Born: 1330
- Died: 1366 (aged 35–36)
- Military career
- Conflicts: Battle of Poitiers

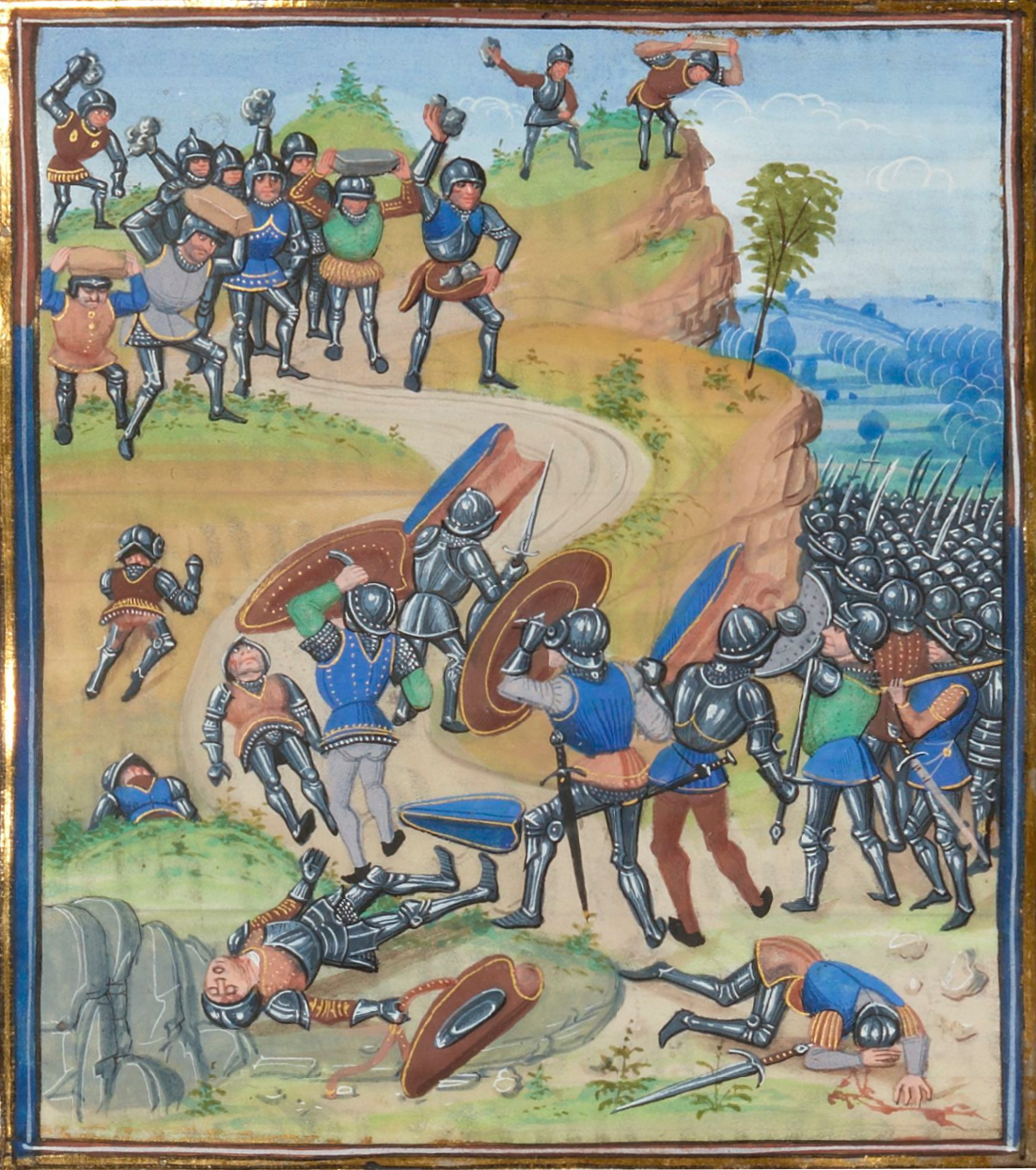
Battle of Brigniais.

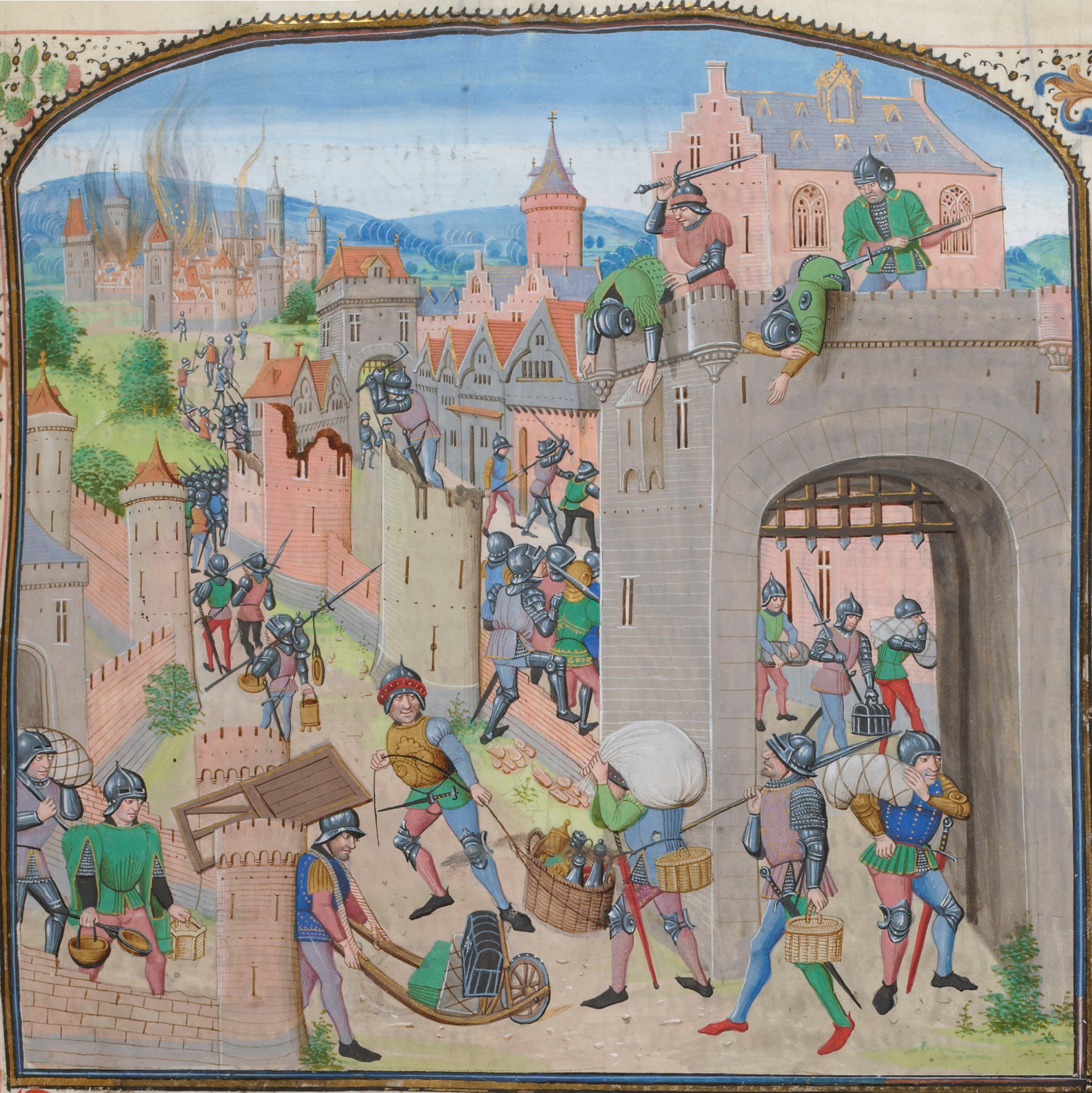
The Tard-Venus pillage Grammont in 1362, from Froissart's Chronicles.

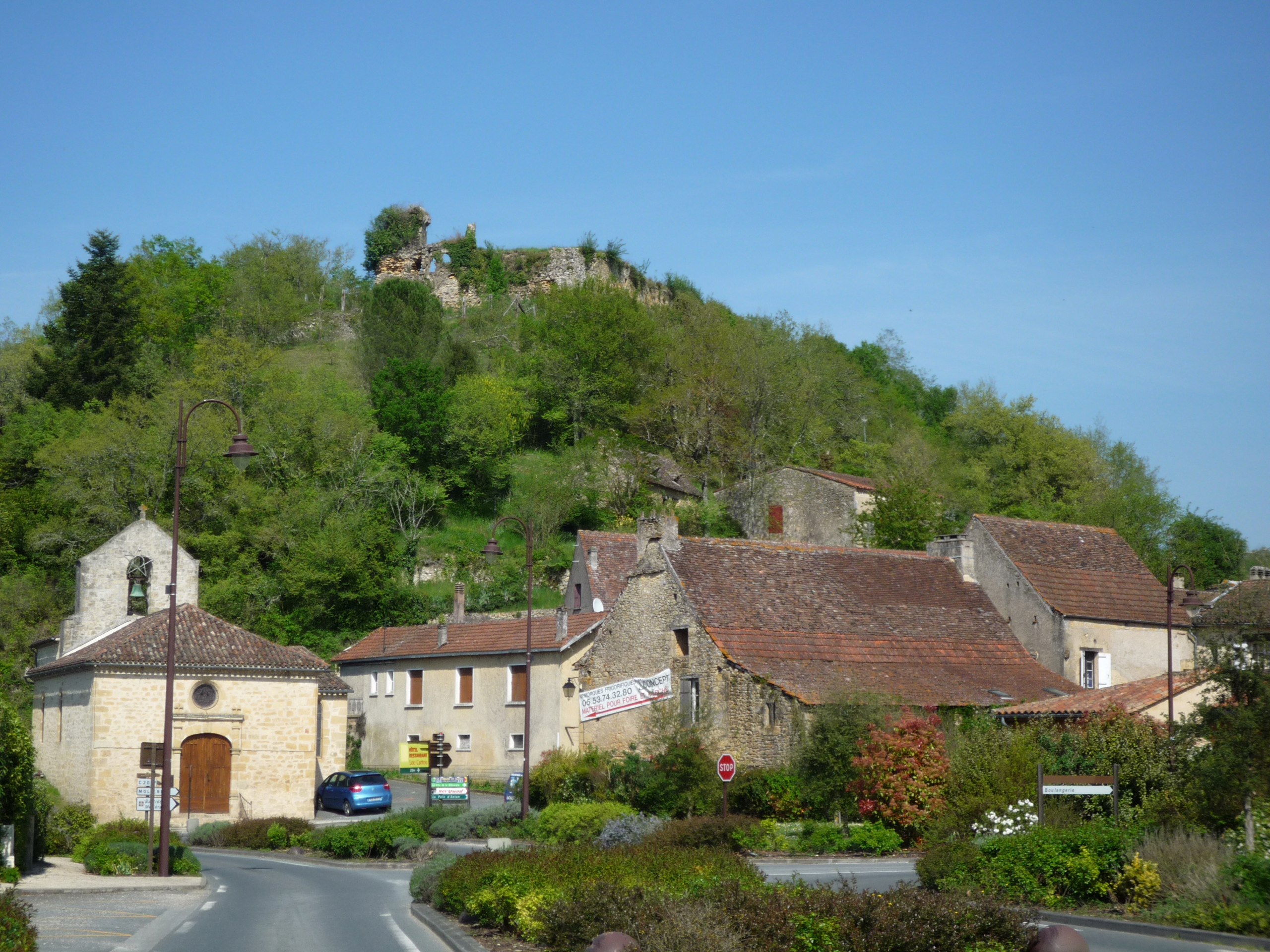
Ruins of Badefol Castle

Seguin de Badefol was a Medieval leader of a large bandit army or routier. With 2,000 troops, he was the head of the largest group of Tard-Venus.

== Private life ==
He was born in 1330 in the castle of Badefols, the son of Seguin Gontaut de Badefol and Margaret de Bérail. Hailing from Périgord much like fellow mercenary Arnaud de Cervole, he was given the nickname Chopin Badefol.

== Career ==
He fought at the Battle of Poitiers in 1356 and in 1360 after the Treaty of Brétigny, and without employ, in 1361 he led a band of brigands, with Bertucat d'Albret into Languedoc, Roussillon, Toulouse and Rouergue districts. In 1362, with Bertucat he took Montbrun, plundered Saint-Flour then participated with Petit Meschin at the Battle of Brignais against Jacques de Bourbon Count of La Marche. In 1363, refusing to go to Italy with most of the other routiers, he returned to plunder Languedoc area with Meschin, Louis Rabaud, Arnaud du Solis and Espiote, taking Brioude on 13 September.

In 1364, the band devastated the region between Lyon and Mâcon. When Seguin evacuated Clermont under an agreement of 21 May 1364, he did not immediately withdraw to Gascony. Instead he stayed at and became master of the Saône and Rhône region and captured sixty castles, including that of Anse in November 1364. After eight months of occupation, in July 1365 Pope Urban V, gave John II of France a sum of 40,000 florins to pay his company out of the kingdom. To enforce this the pope held his father and brothers as hostages in Avignon. At the end of arguments the Pope paid the Tard-Venus to leave and then excommunicated Badefol around August 1365.

The troops of Seguin Badefol also made raids in Puy, Chaise-Dieu in Clermont, Montferrand, Chilhac, Riom, Nonnette, Issoire, Saint-Bonnet Arsis and ravaged Auvergne. Finally, after holding Brioude for more than a year, Seguin Badefol evacuated for a fee and retired with his treasures to Gascony, his native country.

Here Charles II of Navarre employed him, but while in his service he was poisoned – either with figs at Pamplona in December 1365, or according to historian Germain Butaud, at Falces in February 1366 after eating quince and pears.
