= Camus Bour =

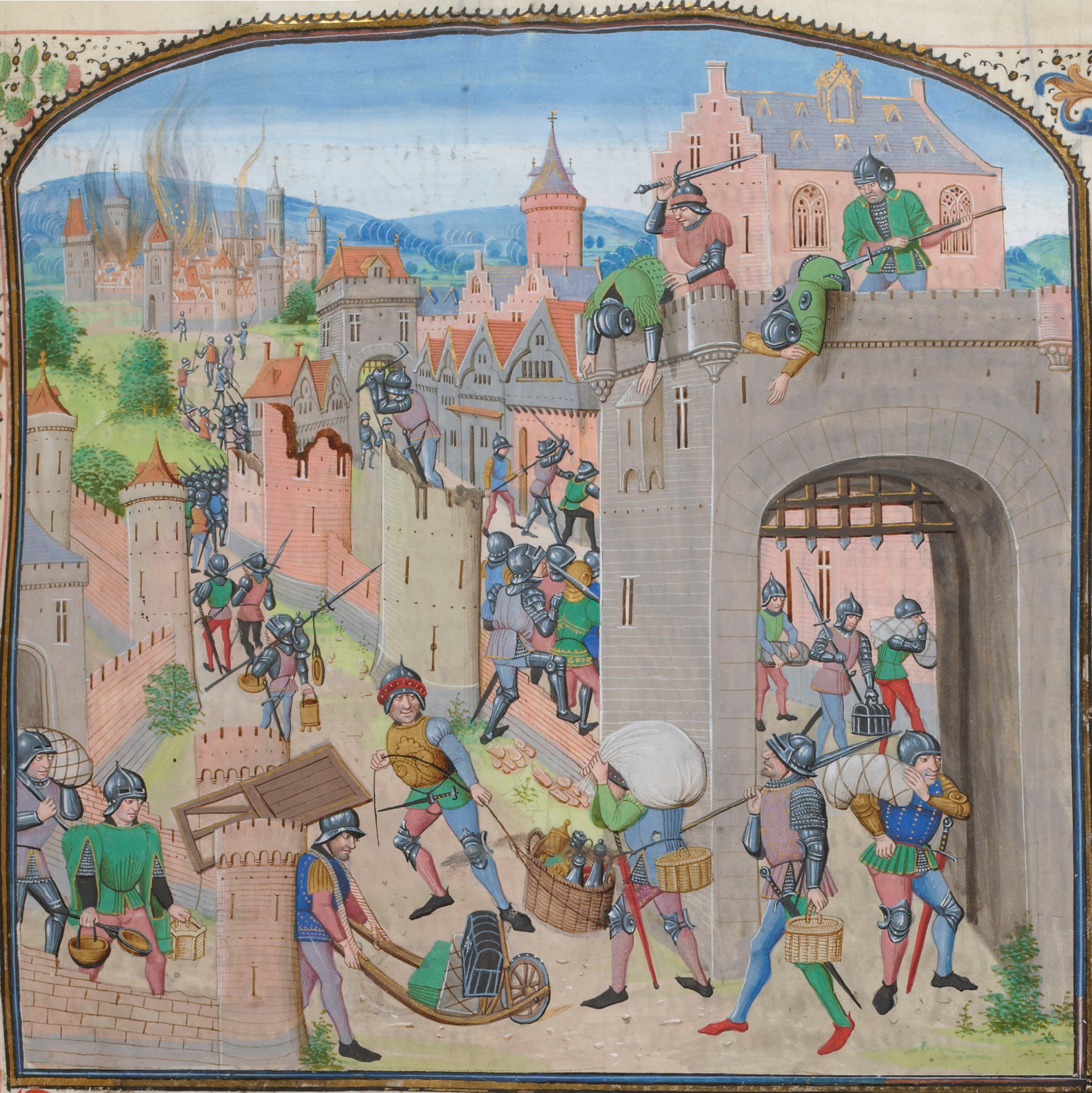
The Tard-Venus pillage Grammont in 1362, from Froissart's Chronicles

Bour Camus, or Camus Bour Lesparre, also known as Camus the Bastard, was a mercenary captain during the Hundred Years War. He was of Navarrese or Gascon origin.

After the Treaty of Brétigny (1360) in the Hundred Years War, he and his troops found themselves unemployed and joined up with the so called Tard-Venus bandits who pillaged much of southern France. His story is mentioned in the Chronicles of Froissart.

After the Battle of Brignais (1362), he went to Italy, with Hawkwood, Creswey and Briquet, to make war against Galeazzo II Visconti and Bernabo Visconti, lords of Milan. During the wars he threw prisoners into a pit full of fire, if they would not or could not redeem their freedom.

He was captured in December 1367 in the castle of Beauvoir by the people of the Duke of Bourbon.
