= Talbart Talbardon =

British mercenary captain

Talbart Talbardon was mercenary captain in the Hundred Years' War. He was also called Taillevardon and was one of several "men-at-arms plundering the whole country ... " according to a letter from that year.

In 1363 he was a squire of Philip the Bold, the king's lieutenant. When the Treaty of Brétigny was signed on 8 May 1360 he was left without employment, and joined the roaming bands of displaced mercenaries who began to plunder the French country side.

According to William Paradin, King John II the Good had him hanged in 1362 at Trishastel along with Guillaume Pot and Jean de Chauffour. However, Guillaume Pot is known to have lived until at least 1367 and Jean de Chauffour was beheaded in Langres in the middle of 1364.
