= Arnaud de Cervole =

French mercenary (1320–1366)

- Born: c. 1320; Lot-et-Garonne, Périgord, France
- Died: May 25, 1366; Near Mâcon, France
- Cause of death: Murdered by his own men
- Spouse: Jeanne de Graçay
- Military career
- Allegiance: Kingdom of France
- Rank: Commander, Great Company (mercenaries)
- Nickname: l'Archiprêtre (The Archpriest)
- Conflicts: Hundred Years' War; Battle of Poitiers (1356); Battle of Brignais; Battle of Cocherel

Arnaud de Cervole, also de Cervolles, de Cervolle, Arnaut de Cervole or Arnold of Cervoles (c. 1320 – 25 May 1366), known as l'Archiprêtre (The Archpriest), was a French mercenary and brigand of the Hundred Years' War in the 14th century.

== Early career ==
Arnaud was born into the minor nobility in what is now the Lot-et-Garonne in the Périgord sometime around the year 1320. Even though a layman, he entered the church and became an archpriest, possessing the ecclesiastical fief of Velines in Dordogne; because of it he was called the Archpriest of Vélines (Archiprêtre de Velines). He was later deprived of his benefice by the archbishop of Bordeaux because he was mixing "with brigands and men of base extraction".

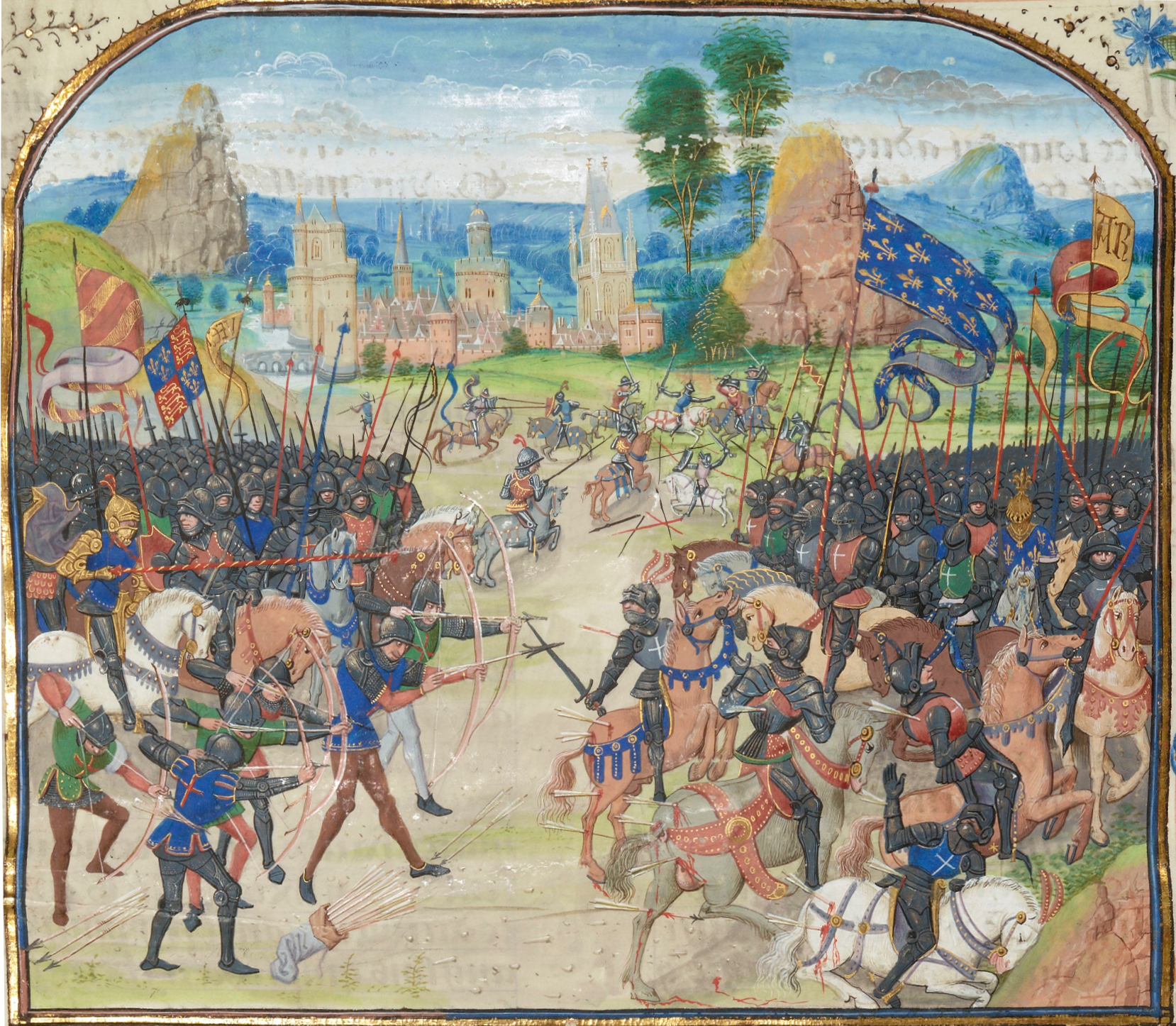
Battle of Poitiers (1356) in Froissart's Chronicles

The Archpriest quickly made a name for himself in the world of mercenaries for his skills in taking walled cities and castles by escalade (ladders). After being recommended by Charles of Spain, the constable of France and cousin to King John II, Arnaud was appointed a royal lieutenant of France, commanding his own company of 80 men. During the Hundred Years' War, he was entrusted with defending the region between the Loire and Dordogne rivers, but he gained a dubious reputation as a bandit. After Charles of Spain was killed by Charles the Bad, Arnaud led his men in taking three castles in Angoulême in order to secure arrears in payment due for his service. While serving under King John II at the siege of Breteuil, Arnaud led his men off the field in order to seize a castle in Normandy. An investigation from the crown into this found it to be criminal and his actions "simple theft", but he was pardoned and later given lordship over the fortress at Châteauneuf-sur-Charente. In 1356, he fought in the battalion of the Count of Alençon at the Battle of Poitiers, where he was injured in battle and captured. This was a catastrophic defeat for the French, as King John II was captured.

After his recovery and release, Arnaud de Cervole married a rich widow, Jeanne de Graçay who had several lordships in central France.

== Bandit leader ==
After the capture of King John II, military action of the war between France and England came to a halt as negotiations began, with France also ceasing payment to Free Companies in their employment. In reaction, the mercenaries began pillaging the country for money, along with running protection rackets to extort villages. In 1357, Arnaud became the commander of the Great Company, a collection of other free companies joined which, at its height, had 2,700 men when most companies had only around a hundred. The individual companies that made up the whole elected their own captains, and the captains elected Arnaud as their commander.

Arnaud led his company into the untouched lands of Queen of Naples Jeanne d'Anjou, taking castles and pillaging villages. Their ultimate goal was taking Marseilles and they had pushed as far as Avignon, home of the Papacy, which caused Pope Innocent VI to open up negotiations. Arnaud and his men entered the city where he was received as if he was "the king of France's son". He met with the Pope and his cardinals several times, confessed his sins, and was paid forty thousand crowns [20,000 gold florins] to distribute among his company, after which Arnaud led his men out of the area, giving up all the territory they had conquered. Reconnaissance missions had led him to realise that taking Marseilles was unrealistic as the city was too populated, too well supplied and too well defended, and by April 1358, he was looking for a way to retreat. He had no ships to surround the port city, and the Queen's scorched earth policy meant that his besieging army would starve before the city did.

== Return to royal service ==
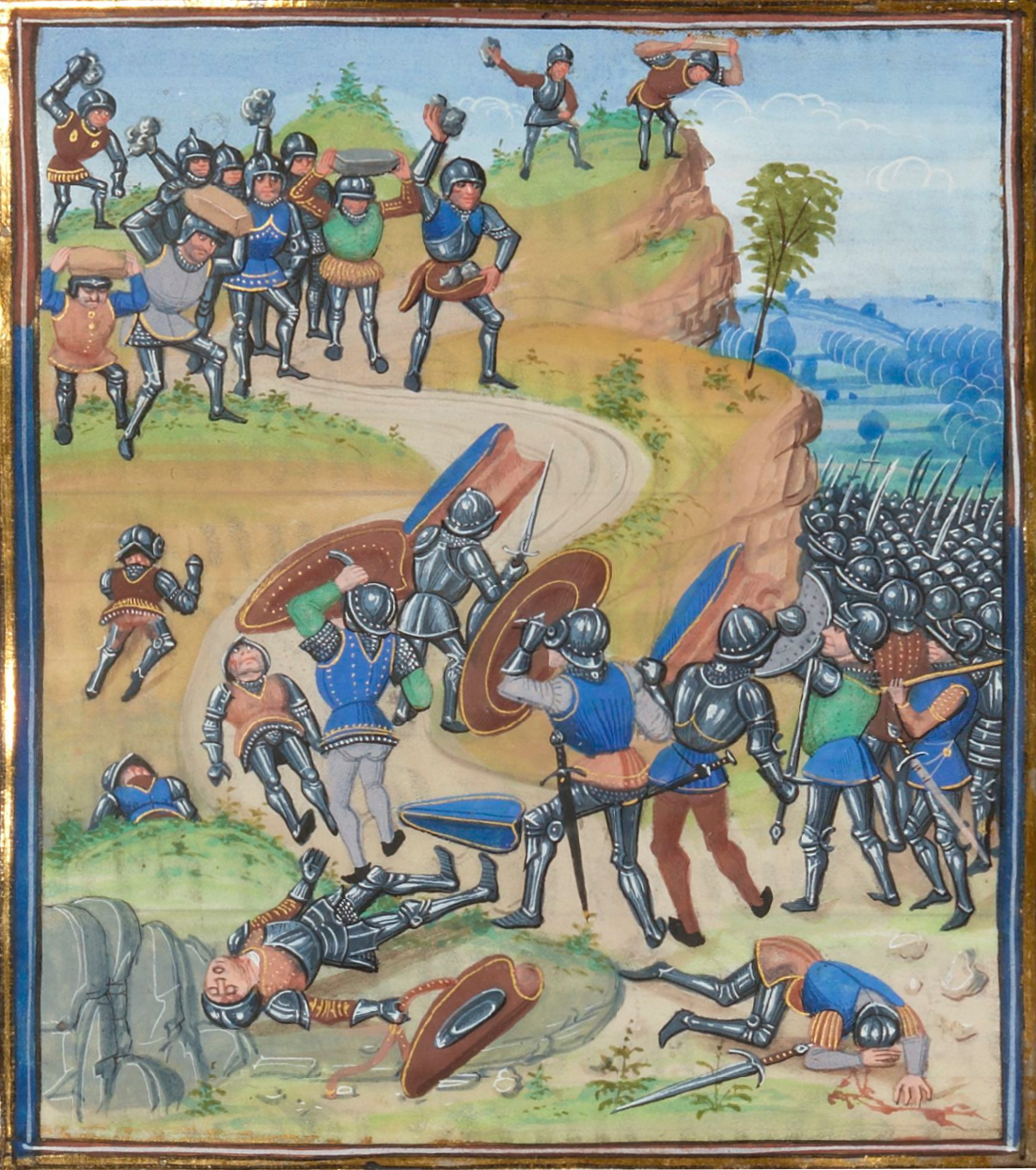
Battle of Brigniais

After returning from Avignon, Arnaud was employed by Charles, Dauphin of France, as the castellan of Nevers until the Peace of Brétigny (1360). In 1362, he was hired by John II to deal with other free companies ravaging Burgundy, dispatching him with a small royal army led by the Comte de Tancarville and the Comte de la Marche, Jacques de Bourbon. Due to poor reconnaissance, the royal army was unaware that they were outnumbered, and on the morning of April 6, 1362, they were defeated at the Battle of Brignais. Jaques de Bourbon was killed in battle and Tancarville and Arnaud were taken prisoner, while the free company was free to continue pillaging the region. Due to lack of food, the victorious company soon split up, and Arnaud led his band in pillaging the Burgundy region. He occupied the region until 1364 when the count paid off the company with 2,500 gold francs. Later that year, his company fought for Charles II of Navarre at the Battle of Cocherel.

== Failed crusade and death ==
In 1365, the Duke of Burgundy offered to lead a major crusade against the Turks in Hungary in order to rid France of all the free companies. The crusade had the support of Pope Urban V who also wanted the companies operating in the Rhone Valley gone, but it never happened. The companies marched to Lyons, where they refused to cross into Italy and to eventually board ships set to sail to the east, and they all, except for Arnaud Great Company, dispersed. A fresh attempt was made in 1366 but supply problems caused discontent, with the company being unfed and unpaid. On 25 May 1366, Arnaud was murdered by his own men while in a dispute, as his army camped near Macon, before passing the Saône.

His lifetime of both private and royal service in battle had led Arnaud to amass a fortune by the time of his death.

== In popular culture ==
Arnaud (as 'L'archprestre et ses Bretons') is mentioned repeatedly in Guillaume de Machaut's Le livre dou voir dit.

Arnaud (as Arnaut) appears as a character in Michael Crichton's novel Timeline and its film adaptation, where he is played by Lambert Wilson.
