= Robert Briquet =

Robert Birkhead (Briquet)
- Military career
- Allegiance: Mercenary
- Rank: Captain
- Conflicts: Hundred Years War

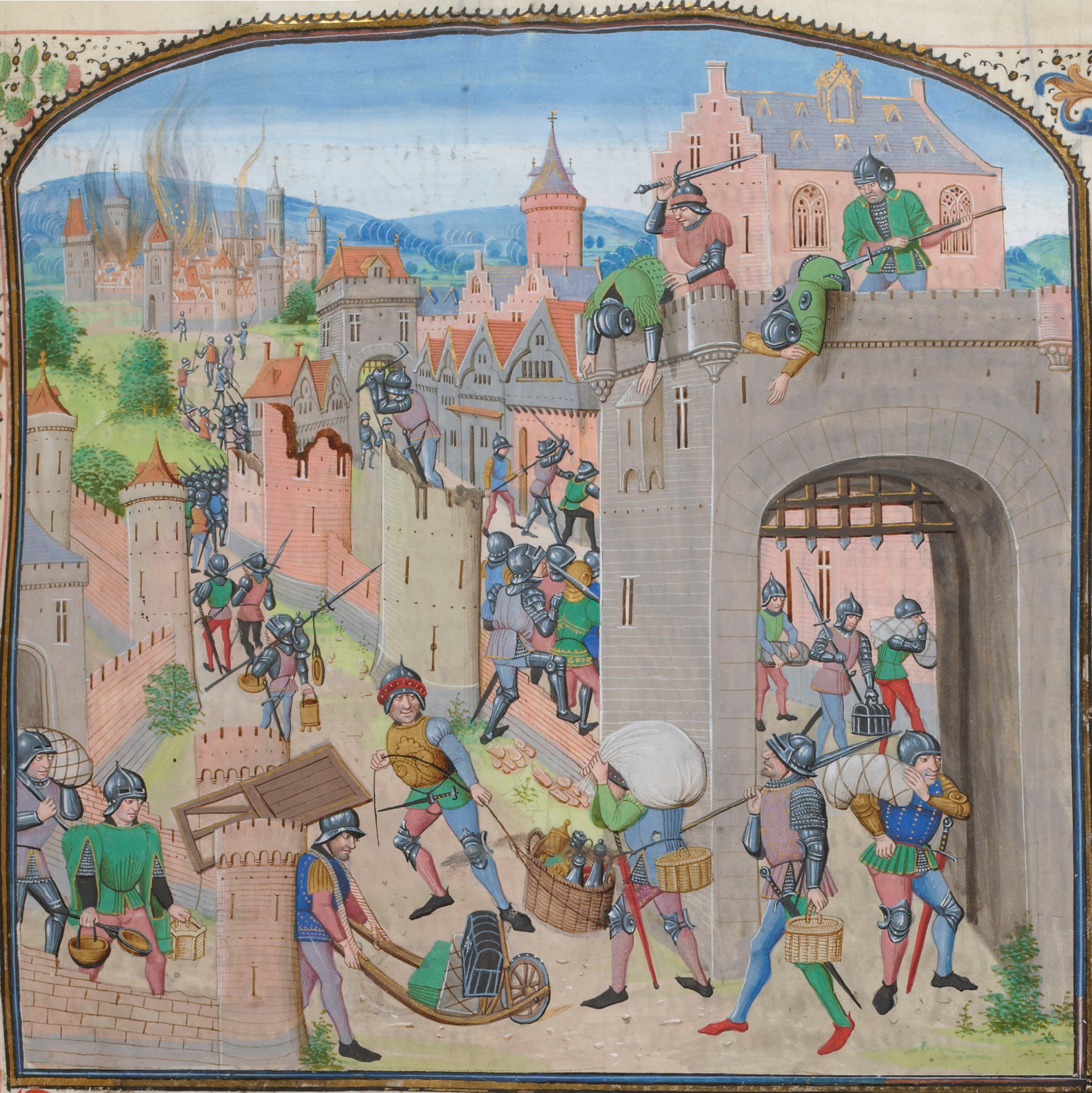
The Tard-Venus pillage Grammont in 1362, from Froissart's Chronicles.

Robert Birkhead (Briquet) was a mercenary captain during the Hundred Years War.

Robert Birkhead was an English captain of a Great Company in the fourteenth century. His name was frequently corrupted by French chroniclers to Briquet, but his real name is made evident by a treaty signed by a number of captains of the Great Companies sometime before December 30th, 1368, where it is rendered as Birkhed and Bircked, as well as Briqued.

After the Treaty of Brétigny Birkhead and his men found themselves unemployed and so become one of the 30 so-called Tard-Venus bandits, that ranged the French country side pillaging town. Subsequently, Pope Innocent VI preached a crusade against the robbers, but it amounted to nothing.

His story is mentioned in the Chronicles of Froissart In mid-Lent 1362 Birkhead's group, composed of 2000 other Tard-Venus mercenaries, was attacking the counties of Macon, Lyon and Forez.

Then mid, year Birkhead with Naudon de Bageran, Francois Hennequin, Espiote, John Creswey, and Camus bour, separated from the main group of brigands and marched on the wealthy and largely undefended papal city of Avignon to make ransom of the Pope and cardinals.

But on 3 June 1362, this army was cut to pieces by 400 Spaniard and Castilians soldiers under the orders of Henry of Trastamara (King of Castile and León) at Montpensier.

Birkhead was present at the Battle of Najera, before which he was knighted. He died sometime in late 1368.
