= Battle of Brignais =

14th century battle in France

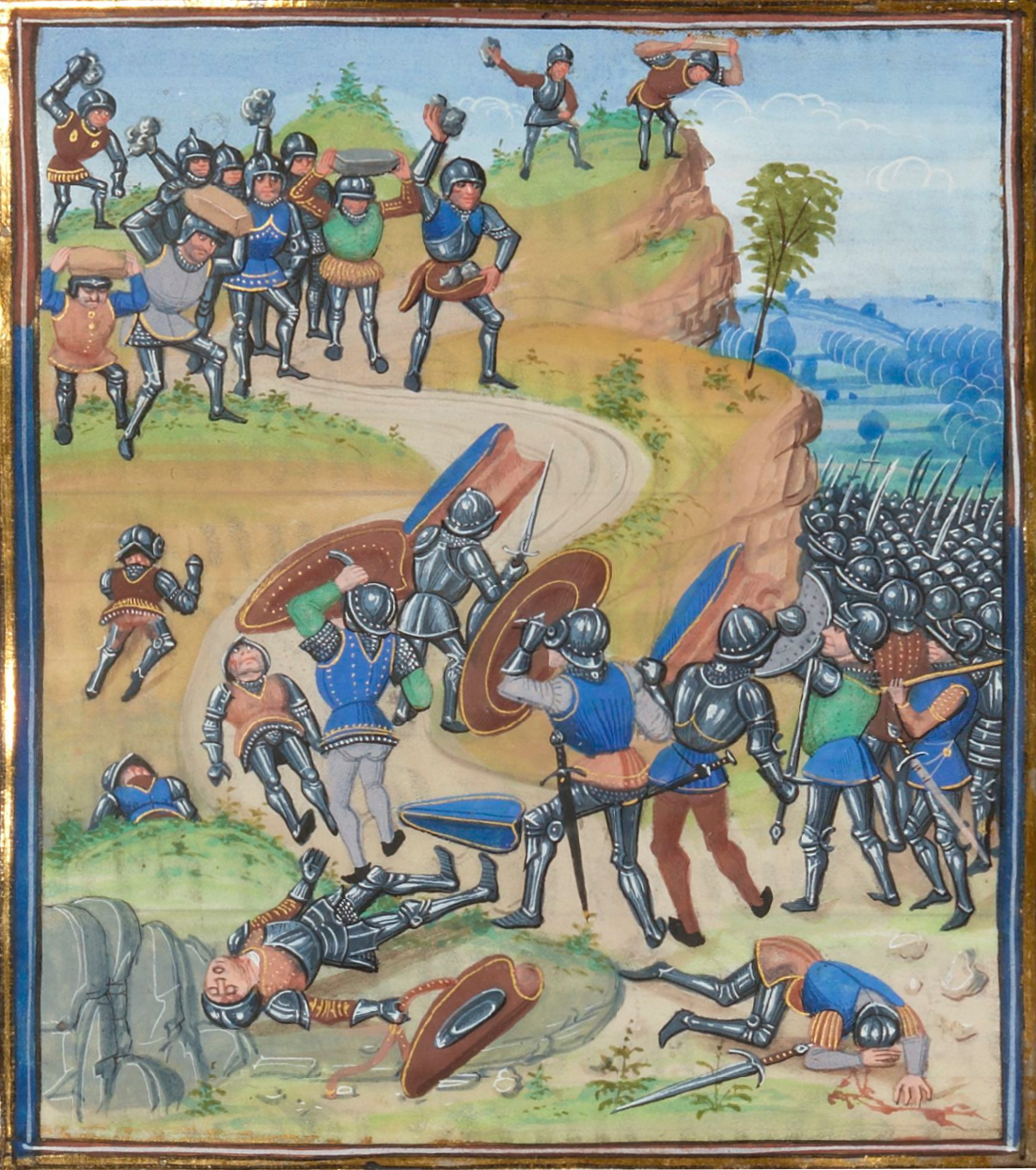
- Battle of Brignais
Date	6 April 1362
Location	Brignais 45°40′N 4°45′E
Result	Free company victory

Belligerents
Kingdom of France	Tard-Venus

Commanders and leaders
Jacques de Bourbon (DOW); Arnaud de Cervole (POW)	Seguin de Badefol; Petit Meschin other mercenary captains

Strength
12,000	15,000

The Battle of Brignais was fought on the 6th of April 1362, between forces of the Kingdom of France under Count Jacques de Bourbon, from whom the later royal Bourbons descend, and the Tard-Venus Free Companies, led by mercenary captains including Petit Meschin and Seguin de Badefol.

== Course of the battle ==
The French forces, coming from the town of Saint-Genis-Laval, besieged the town of Brignais, which had been seized in March by the Companies as an operating base.

There are two versions concerning the course of the battle.

According to Matteo Villani, the royal army camped near the fortifications after a failed assault. When Petit Meschin (who was during that time pillaging the nearby County of Forez) learned that his comrades were in trouble, he brought his men back to Brignais as fast as he could. Then, taking advantage of the heights, the night, and the element of surprise, he charged against the royal army's camp. The garrison inside the castle then joined Petit Mesquin's forces, resulting in a total defeat for the French army.

According to Jean Froissart, Seguin de Badefol had the idea to dispatch the Tard-Venus forces into two groups: one in front of the royal army, and the other one on surrounding hills. The royal army, attacking the visible group, was flanked by the Tard-Venus stationed on the hills.

== Consequences ==
The French army was destroyed. Jacques de Bourbon, Count of La Marche and Constable of France, was mortally wounded, as was his eldest son Peter II, Count of La Marche. Louis d'Albon, Count of Forez, was also killed. A number of members of the French army were captured, including many lords and Arnaud de Cervole, a famous mercenary captain serving in the French ranks.

Despite their victory, the Tard-Venus did not try to besiege the city of Lyon.
