= Froissart's Chronicles =

History of the Hundred Years' War

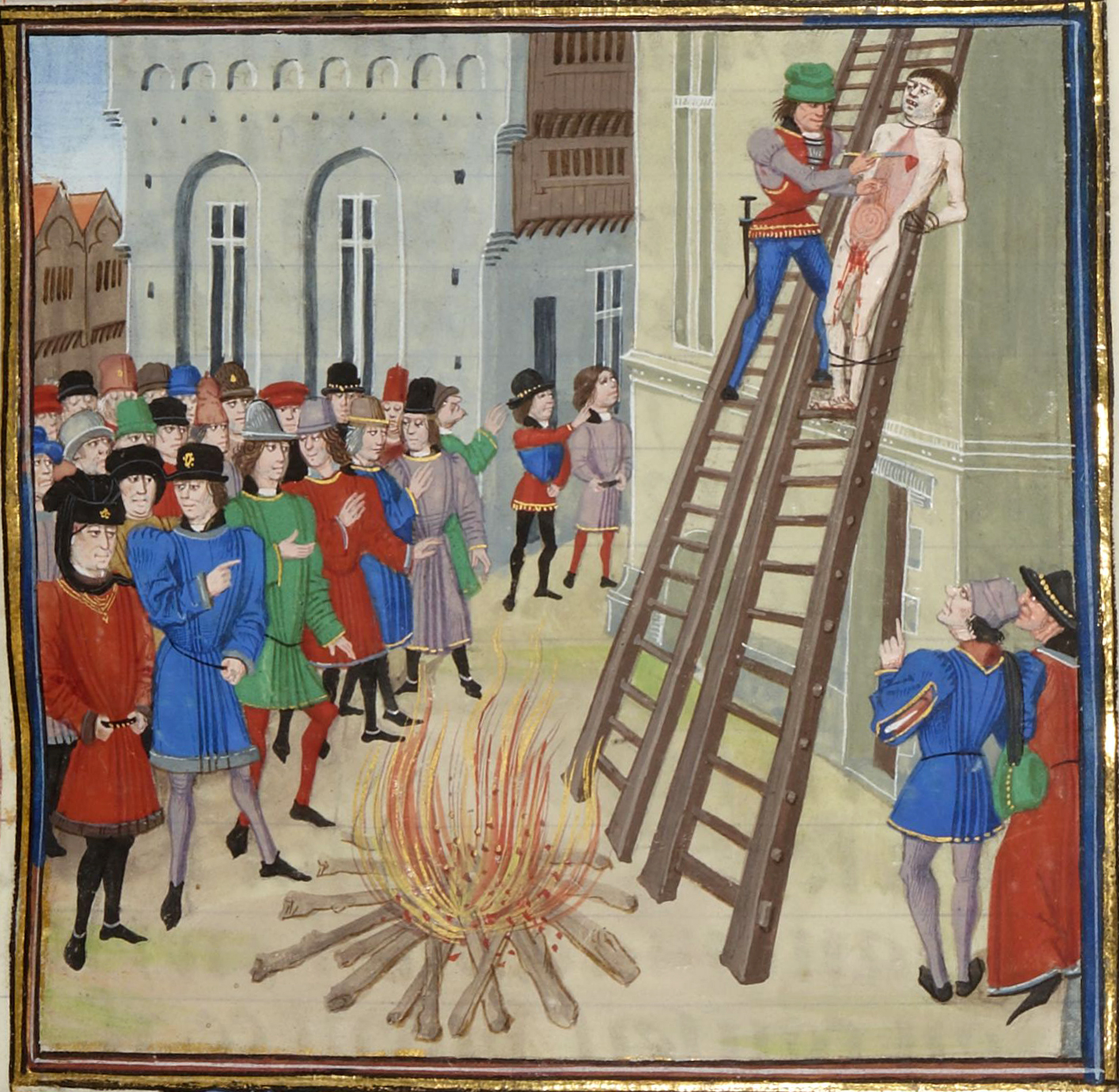
The execution of Hugh the younger Despenser, a miniature from the Gruuthuse manuscript of the Chronicles.

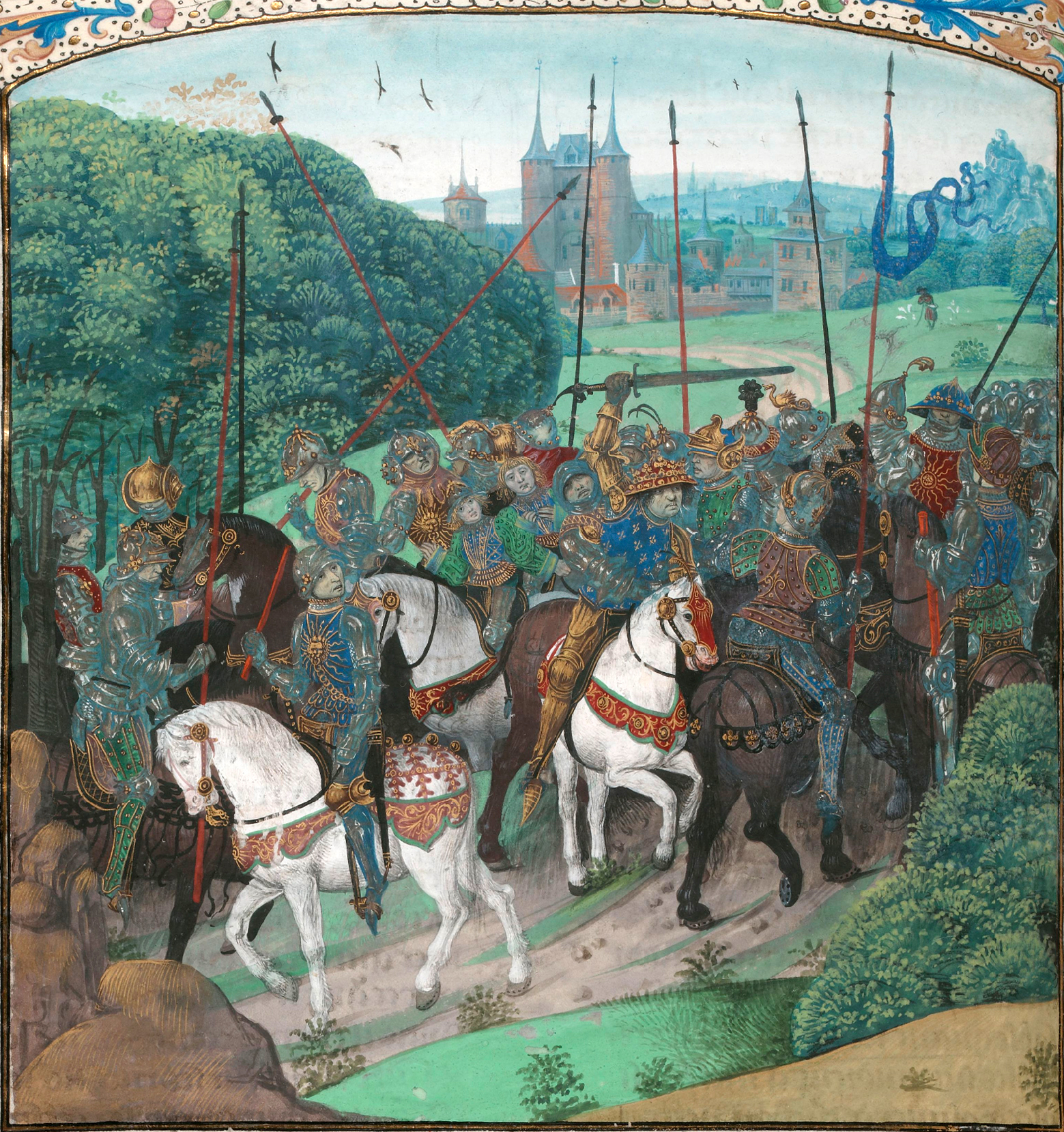
King Charles VI of France attacks his companions in a fit of insanity.

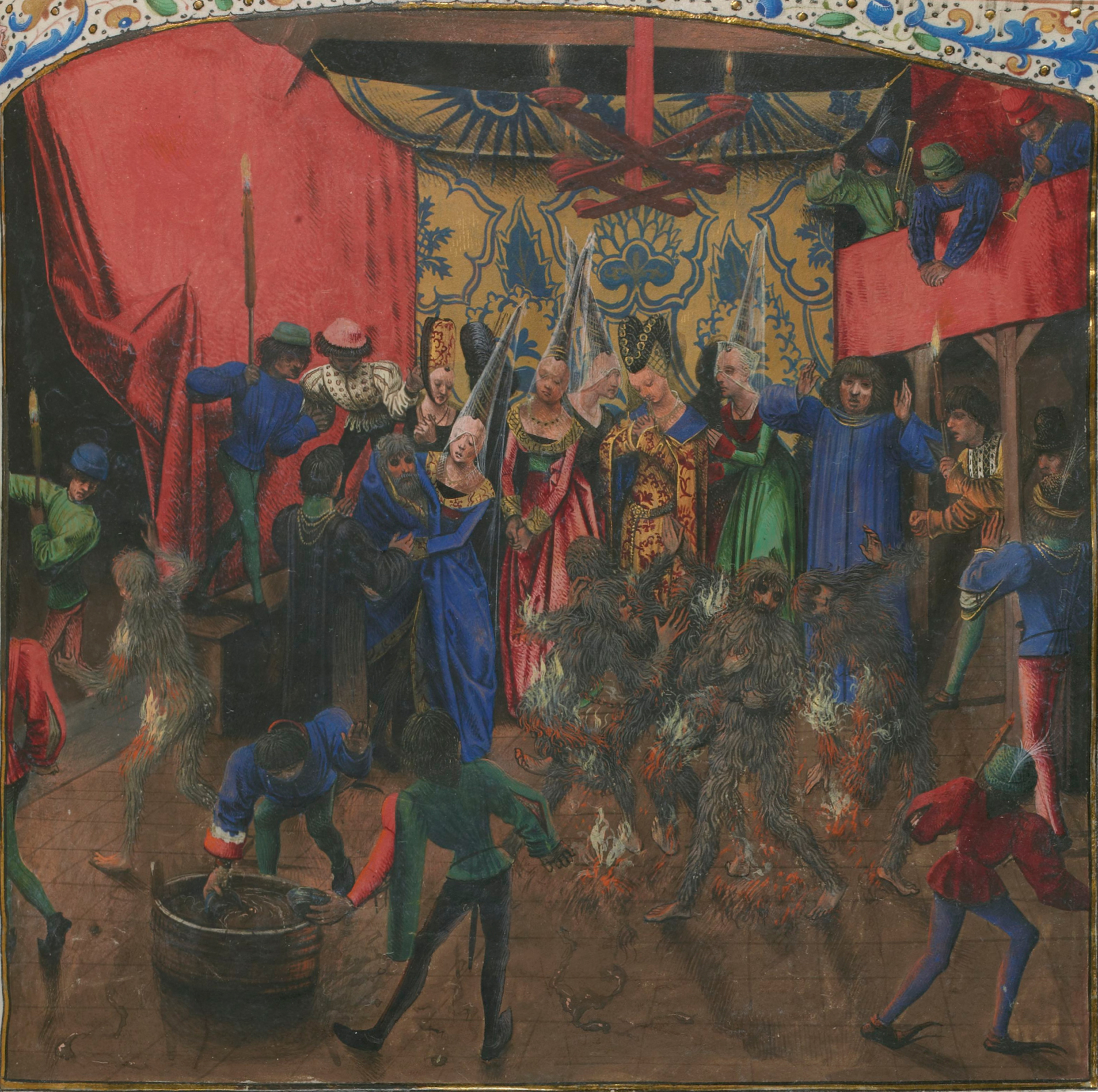
The Bal des Ardents in the Gruuthuse MS: Charles VI huddling under the Duchess of Berry's skirt at middle left, and burning dancers in the centre

Froissart's Chronicles (or Chroniques) are a prose history of the Hundred Years' War written in the 14th century by Jean Froissart. The Chronicles open with the events leading up to the deposition of King Edward II of England in 1327, and cover the period up to 1400, recounting events in western Europe, mainly in England, France, Scotland, the Low Countries and the Iberian Peninsula, although at times also mentioning other countries and regions such as Italy, Germany, Ireland, the Balkans, Cyprus, Turkey and North Africa.

For centuries the Chronicles have been recognized as the chief expression of the chivalric culture of 14th-century England and France. Froissart's work is perceived as being of vital importance to informed understandings of the European 14th century, particularly of the Hundred Years' War. But modern historians also recognize that the Chronicles have many shortcomings as a historical source: they contain erroneous dates, have misplaced geography, give inaccurate estimations of sizes of armies and casualties of war, and may be biased in favour of the author's patrons.

Although Froissart is sometimes repetitive or covers seemingly insignificant subjects, his battle descriptions are lively and engaging. For the earlier periods Froissart based his work on other existing chronicles, but his own experiences, combined with those of interviewed witnesses, supply much of the detail of the later books. Although Froissart may never have been in a battle, he visited Sluys in 1386 to see the preparations for a French invasion of England that eventually never took place. He was present at other significant events such as the baptism of Richard II in Bordeaux in 1367, the coronation of King Charles VI of France in Rheims in 1380, the marriage of Duke John of Berry and Jeanne of Boulogne in Riom and the joyous entry of the French queen Isabeau of Bavaria in Paris, both in 1389.

Sir Walter Scott once remarked that Froissart had "marvellous little sympathy" for the "villain churls". It is true that Froissart often omits to talk about the common people, but that is largely the consequence of his stated aim to write not a general chronicle but a history of the chivalric exploits that took place during the wars between France and England. Nevertheless, Froissart was not indifferent to the wars' effects on the rest of society. His Book II focuses extensively on popular revolts in different parts of western Europe (France, England and Flanders) and in this part of the Chronicles the author often demonstrates good understanding of the factors that influenced local economies and their effect on society at large; he also seems to have a lot of sympathy in particular for the plight of the poorer strata of the urban populations of Flanders.

The Chronicles are a very extensive work: with their almost 1.5 million words, they are amongst the longest works written in French prose in the late Middle Ages. Few modern complete editions have been published, but the text was printed from the late 15th century onwards. Enguerrand de Monstrelet continued the Chronicles to 1440, while Jean de Wavrin incorporated large parts of it in his own work. Robert Gaguin's Compendium super origine et gestis Francorum made ample use of Froissart. In the 15th and 16th centuries the Chronicles were translated into Dutch, English, Latin, Spanish, Italian and Danish. The English translation, dated 1523–1525 and carried out by the then-Lord Berners, is one of the oldest historical prose works in English. The text of Froissart's Chronicles is preserved in more than 150 manuscripts, many of which are illustrated, some extensively.

== Background ==
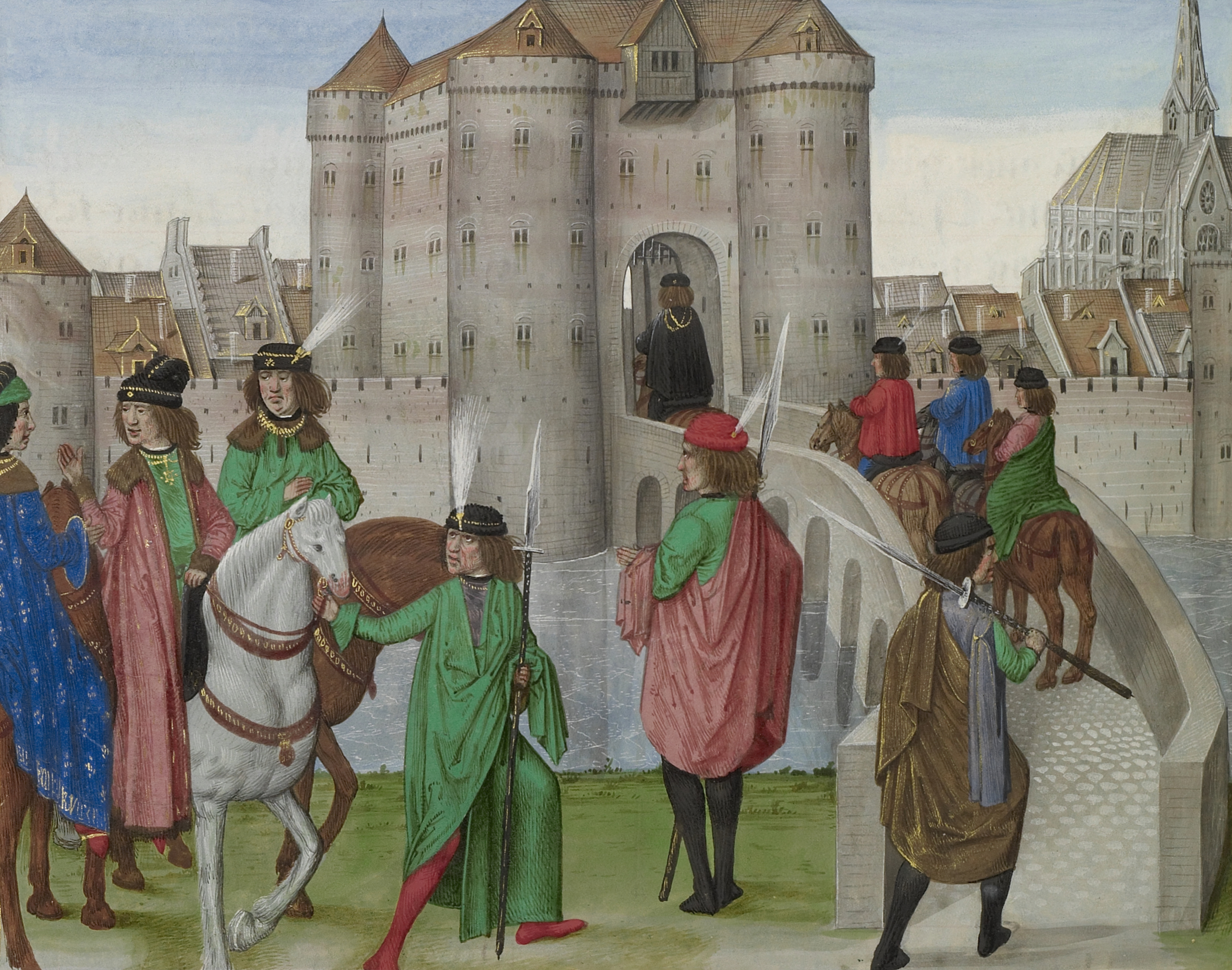
The Dukes of Berry and Burgundy leaving Paris to meet with the Duke of Brittany, miniature of 1480-83

Jean Froissart came from Valenciennes in the County of Hainaut, situated in the western tip of the Holy Roman Empire, bordering France (it has been part of France since 1678). He seems to have come from what we would today call a middle-class background, but spent much of his adult life in courts, and took on the world-view of the late medieval feudal aristocracy, who initially represented his readership. He appears to have gained his living as a writer, and was a notable French poet in his day. At least by the end of his life he had taken holy orders, and received a profitable benefice.

He first wrote a rhyming chronicle for the English queen Philippa of Hainault, which he offered to her in 1361 or 1362. The text of this earliest historical work, which Froissart himself mentioned in the prologue of his Chronicles, is usually considered to have been completely lost, but some scholars have argued that a 14th-century manuscript containing a rhyming chronicle, of which fragments are now kept in libraries in Paris and Berlin, may be identified as this so-called 'lost chronicle'.

== Synopsis ==
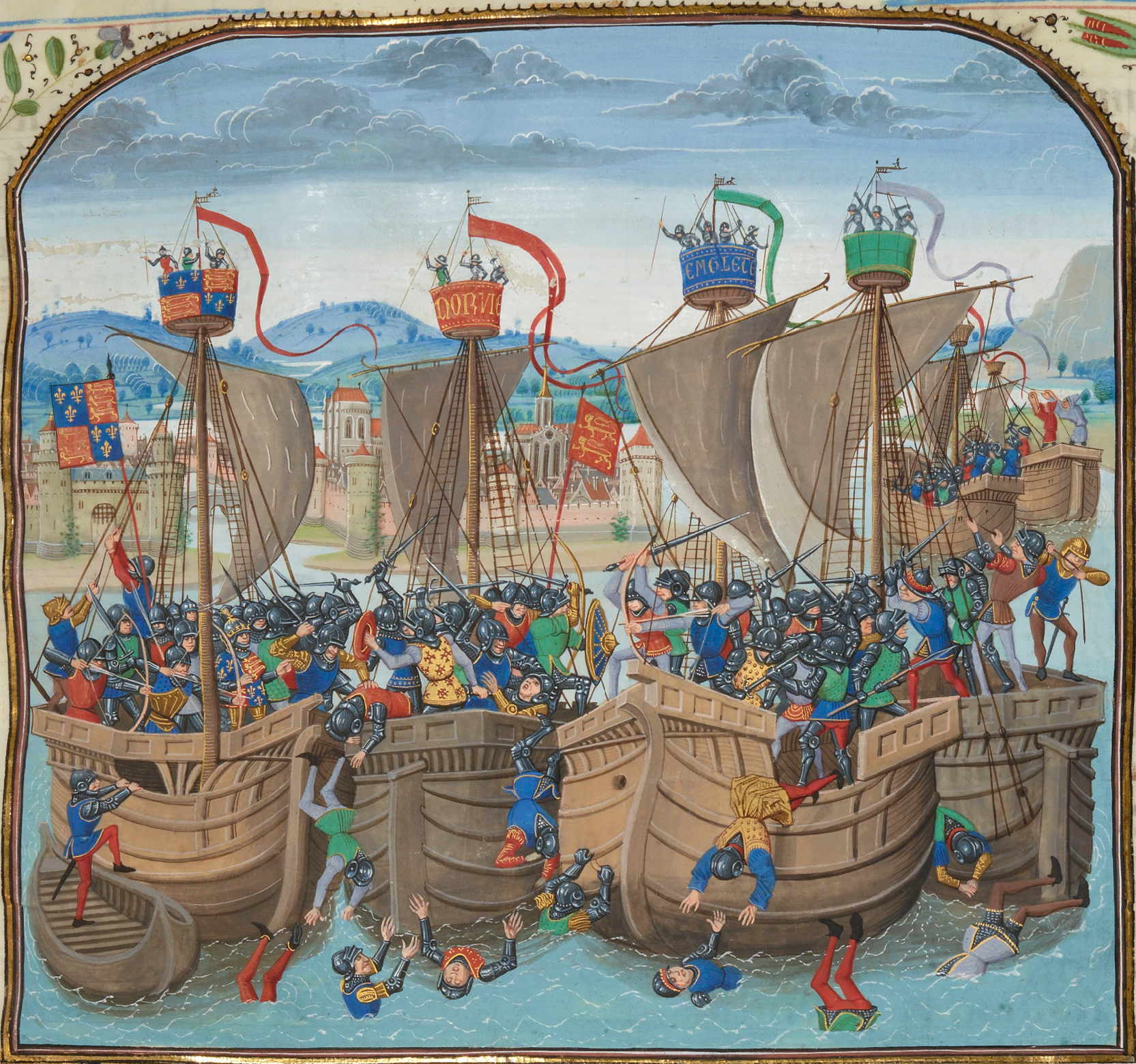
The Battle of Sluys, 1340, in the Gruuthuse MS

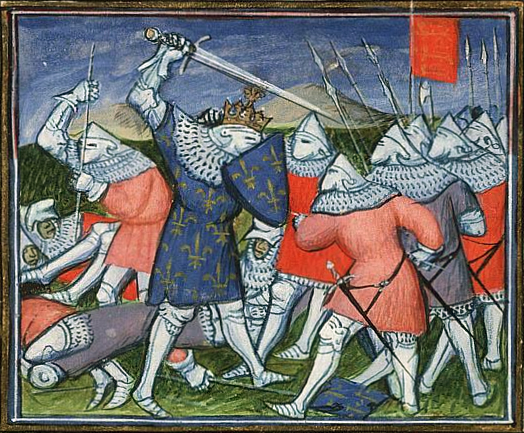
The Battle of Poitiers in 1356, in a manuscript of c. 1410, which mixes scenes with patterned and (as here) naturalistic backgrounds

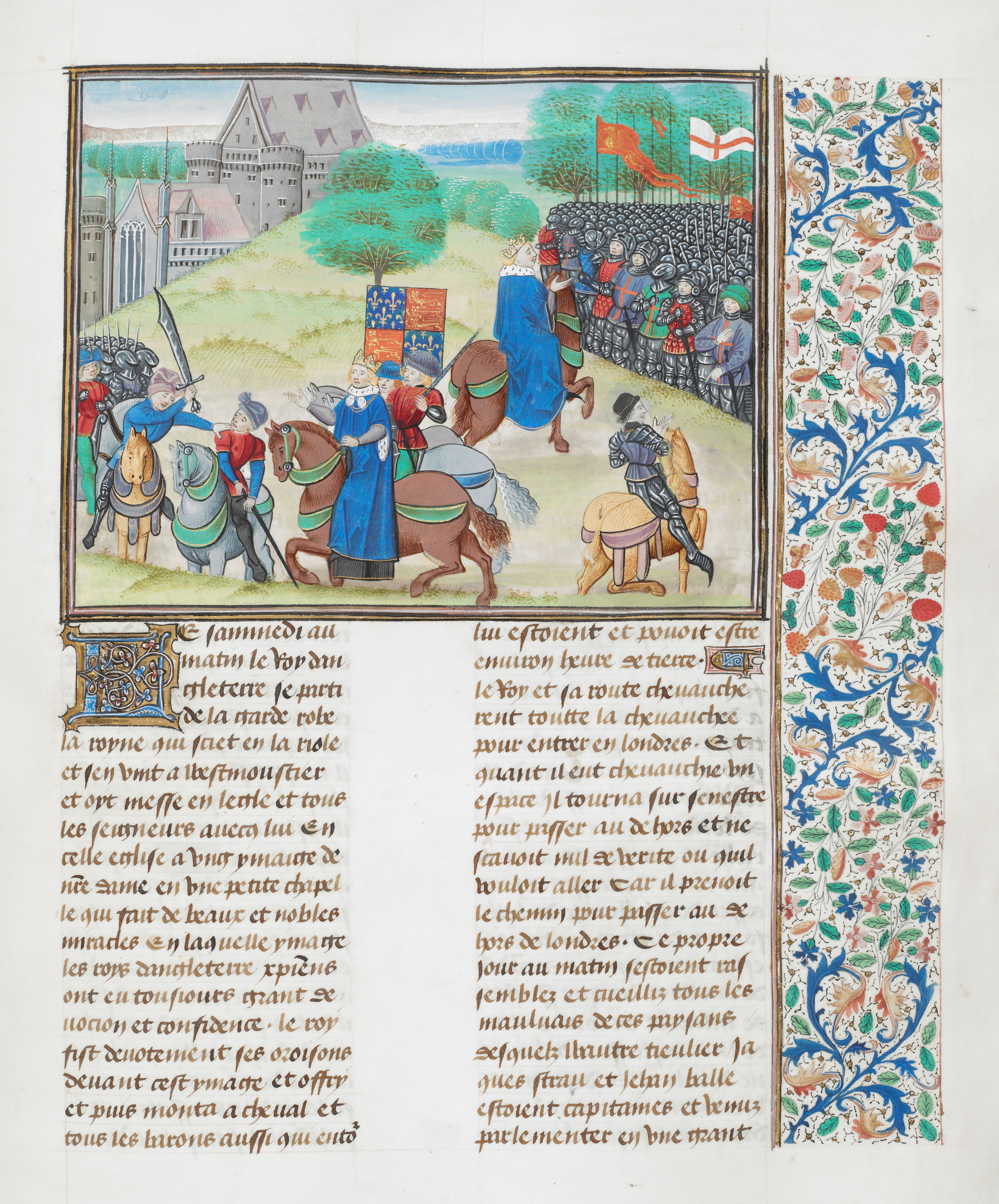
Illuminated page from c. 1480 manuscript of Book II depicting Richard II at the Peasants' Revolt and at the death of Wat Tyler, 1381

Some of the important events recorded in Froissart's Chronicles:

Book I 1322–1377

- Execution of Hugh the younger Despenser (1326)
- Edward II deposed and accession of Edward III (1327)
- Edward III's campaign in Scotland (1327)
- Edward III's marriage to Philippa of Hainault (1328)
- Edward III's feudal homage to Philip VI of Valois (1331)
- Edward III's search for allies in the Low Countries against Philip VI of Valois
- The Thiérache campaign (1339)
- Battle of Sluys (1340)
- The Siege of Tournai (1340)
- The Breton war of succession (1340-1364)
- The Earl of Derby's campaign in Gascony (1344-1345)
- Battle of Crécy (1346)
- The Siege of Calais (1346-1347)
- Battle of Neville's Cross (1346)
- Battle of Winchelsea (1350)
- Battle of Poitiers (1356)
- Étienne Marcel leads a merchant revolt in Paris (1358)
- The Jacquerie (1358)
- The Free Companies
- The Black Prince's campaigns in Southern France
- Edward III's Rheims campaign (1359-1360)
- The Peace of Brétigny (1360)
- The Battle of Brignais (1362)
- The death of King John II of France (1364)
- The battle of Cocherel (1364)
- The battle of Auray (1364); the end of the Breton succession war
- The Castilian Civil War (1366-1369): the Black Prince's campaigns on the Iberian Peninsula; the battle of Nájera (1367); the battle of Montiel (1369)
- The sack of Limoges (1370)
- The battle of Chizé (1373)
- The deaths of the Black Prince and Edward III (1377); accession of Richard II

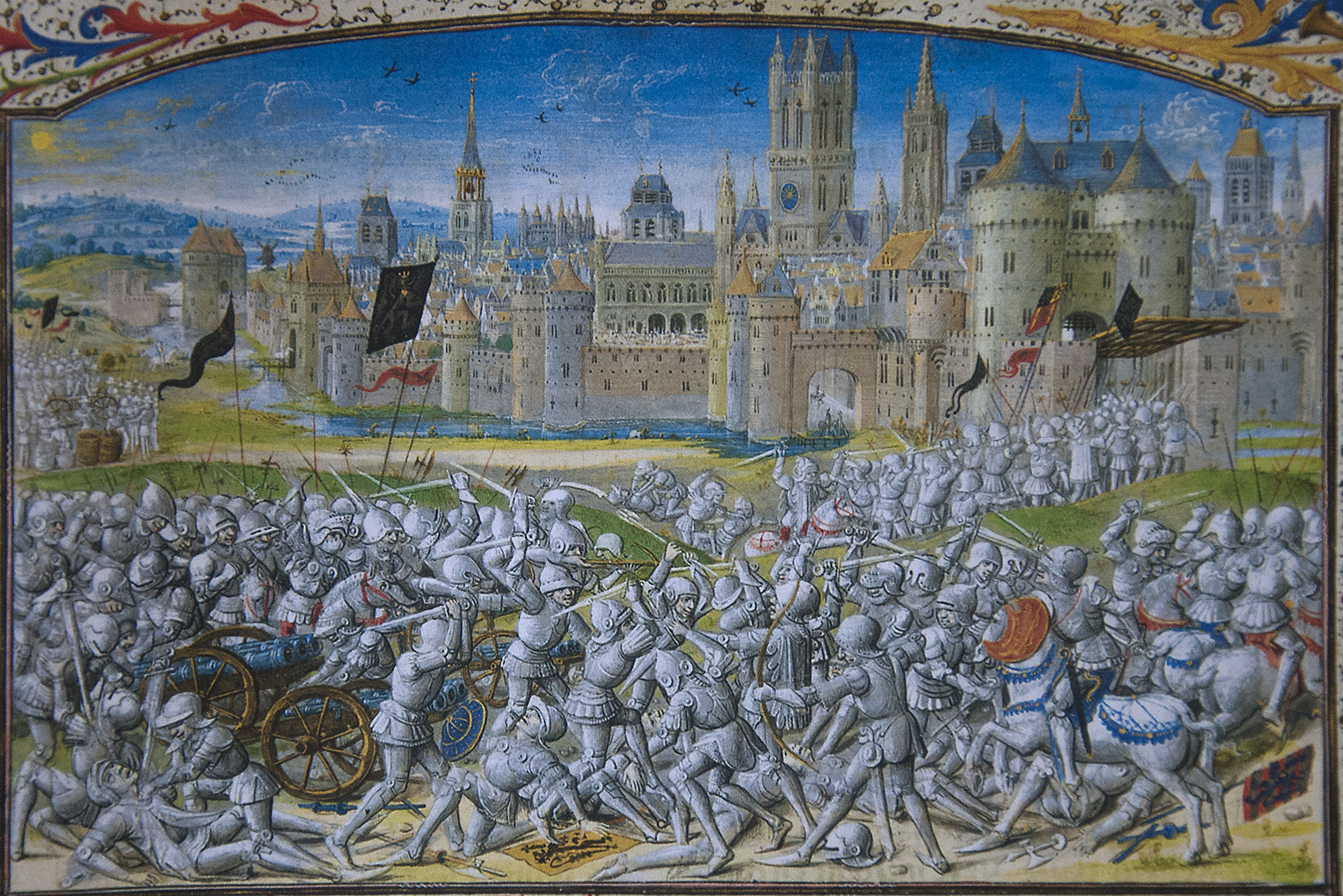
Chroniques de Froissart, Battle of Beverhoutsveld, 1382.

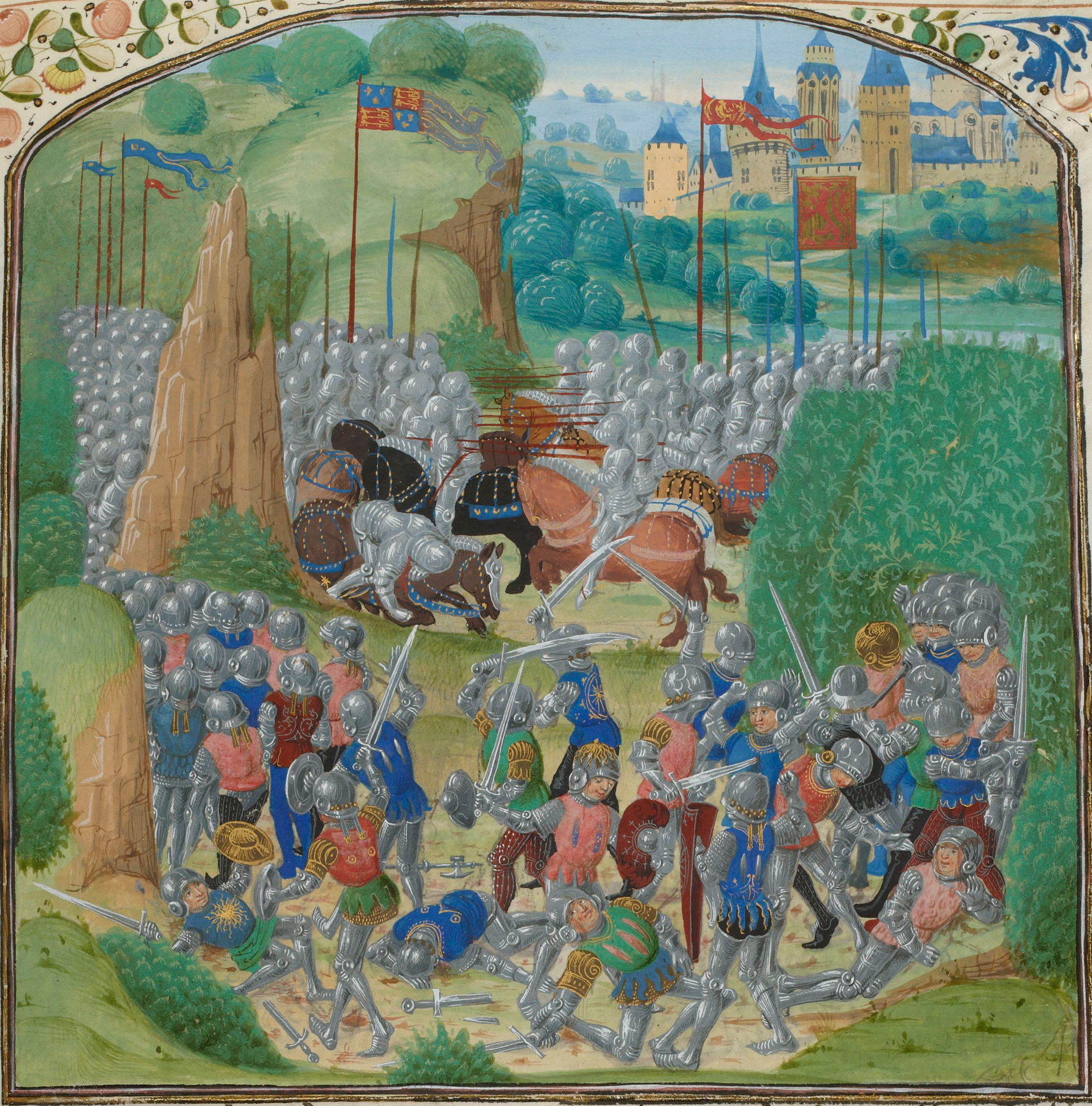
Battle of Otterburn, 1388

Book II 1376–1385

- The start of the Great Schism (1378)
- The Ghent Revolt (1379-1385)
- The Peasants' Revolt in England (1381)
- The Battle of Roosebeke (1382)
- The marriage of Charles VI to Isabella of Bavaria

Book III 1386–1388

- The French preparations for an aborted invasion of England
- The final trial by combat ordered by French courts between Jean de Carrouges and Jacques Le Gris
- Richard II in conflict with his uncles
- The Battle of Otterburn

Book IV 1389–1400

- The Bal des Ardents at a festival in honor of Isabeau of Bavaria
- A tournament in Smithfield held by Richard II
- The death of Gaston III "Fébus" of Foix-Béarn
- The madness of Charles VI
- Richard II deposed and accession of Henry IV
- Battle of Nicopolis and massacre of the prisoners

== Composition and sources ==
Froissart began writing Book I possibly at the request of Robert de Namur, to whom the earliest version is dedicated. In the prologue of this version of the prose text, Froissart justified his new enterprise by his desire to improve on his first attempts to write a historical account of the early years of the Hundred Years' War. In particular he denounced his earlier rhyming chronicle, whose accuracy, he admitted, had not always been as good as such important matters as war and knightly prowess require. In order to improve the quality and historical accuracy of his work, Froissart declared his intention to follow now as his main source the Vrayes Chroniques of Jean Le Bel, who had expressed fierce criticism on verse as a suitable vehicle for serious history writing. Froissart also used other texts, such as the Life of the Black Prince by Chandos Herald, in particular for the Black Prince's campaign in Spain in 1366–1367. He furthermore inserted some official documents into his text, including the act of hommage by King Edward III to the French King Philip VI (1331) and the English version of the Peace Treaty of Calais (1360).

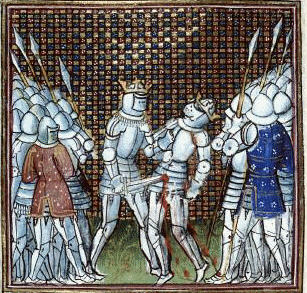
Henry II kills his predecessor as King of Castile and León, Peter the Cruel, in an early illustration taken from Besançon, BM, MS 864 (ca. 1410-1420)

Le Bel had written his chronicle for Jean, lord of Beaumont, uncle of Philippa of Hainault, who had been a supporter of Queen Isabella and the rebellion which led to the deposition of Edward II in 1326. Jean of Hainault had also taken part in several of the early battles of the Hundred Years' War, first on the English side, then on the French. His grandson, Guy II, Count of Blois later became the main patron of Froissart's Chronicles. Jean Le Bel himself, throughout his work expressed great admiration for Edward III, in whose 1327 Weardale campaign against the Scots he had fought. For all these reasons Froissart must have highly valued Le Bel's chronicle as a source for reliable information about the events which led to the outbreak of the war between France and England and about the early phases of the Hundred Years' War. Comparison of Froissart's Book I with Le Bel's work shows that for the early parts of the Chronicles (up to c.1360) Froissart often directly copied and developed very large parts of Le Bel's text.

Froissart seems to have written several new drafts or versions of Book I, which covers the period up to 1378/1379, at different points in time. Several of these variant versions are now known to scholars by the unique manuscripts which have transmitted their texts, such as the 'Amiens' (Amiens, Bibliothèque municipale, ms. 486), 'Valenciennes' (Valenciennes, Bibliothèque municipale, ms. 638), and 'Rome' versions of Book I, so named after manuscripts kept in the municipal libraries of Amiens and Valenciennes and in the Vatican Library. The so-called 'Rome' version of Book I (Vatican City, Biblioteca Apostolica Vaticana, Reg. Lat. 869) has only partly survived and now only covers the period up to c.1350.

The order of the authorial versions of Book I has been discussed extensively by scholars in the last century and a half and there have been many fundamental disagreements. French scholars have often followed Siméon Luce, the French 19th-century editor of the Chronicles, who thought that the 'Amiens' version was a more recent version that must have followed the 'A' and 'B' versions in the chronology. But research by Godfried Croenen has now firmly established that these earlier views are no longer tenable. Croenen has demonstrated that the so-called 'A' version that Luce had identified, is in fact a hybrid version composed by medieval scribes who put together the very beginning and end of the authorial 'A' version, combining it with a much larger part of the so-called 'B' version, and a fragment of the Grandes Chroniques de France covering the years 1350–1356. The authorial 'A' version, which is now largely lost except for the fragments from the beginning and end, is the first version of Book I written by Froissart and was probably composed by him between June and December 1381.

The 'Amiens' and 'Valenciennes' versions are both earlier than the so-called 'B' redaction. The 'Amiens' version and the abridgement of Book I (Paris, BnF, fr. 10144) were probably both written in the period 1384–1391, but the 'Amiens' version seems the earlier of the two. The 'B' redaction is the version of Book I that was edited by S. Luce for the Société d'Histoire de France and that represents what is often seen as the 'standard' version of Book I. Luce himself was convinced that the 'B' version represented the earliest completed state of Book I and that it was therefore earlier than the 'Amiens' text. The evidence from the text, however, argues strongly for a date of composition in or shortly after 1391, so certainly later than the 'Amiens' version, and before 1399.

The 'B' version was followed by the 'C' version of Book I, written sometime between 1395 and 1399, which was long considered lost; the 'C' version actually survives in a single manuscript now in the Newberry Library in Chicago. The 'Rome' version was written towards the end of Froissart's life, at the earliest in late 1404 and probably sometime before 1415.

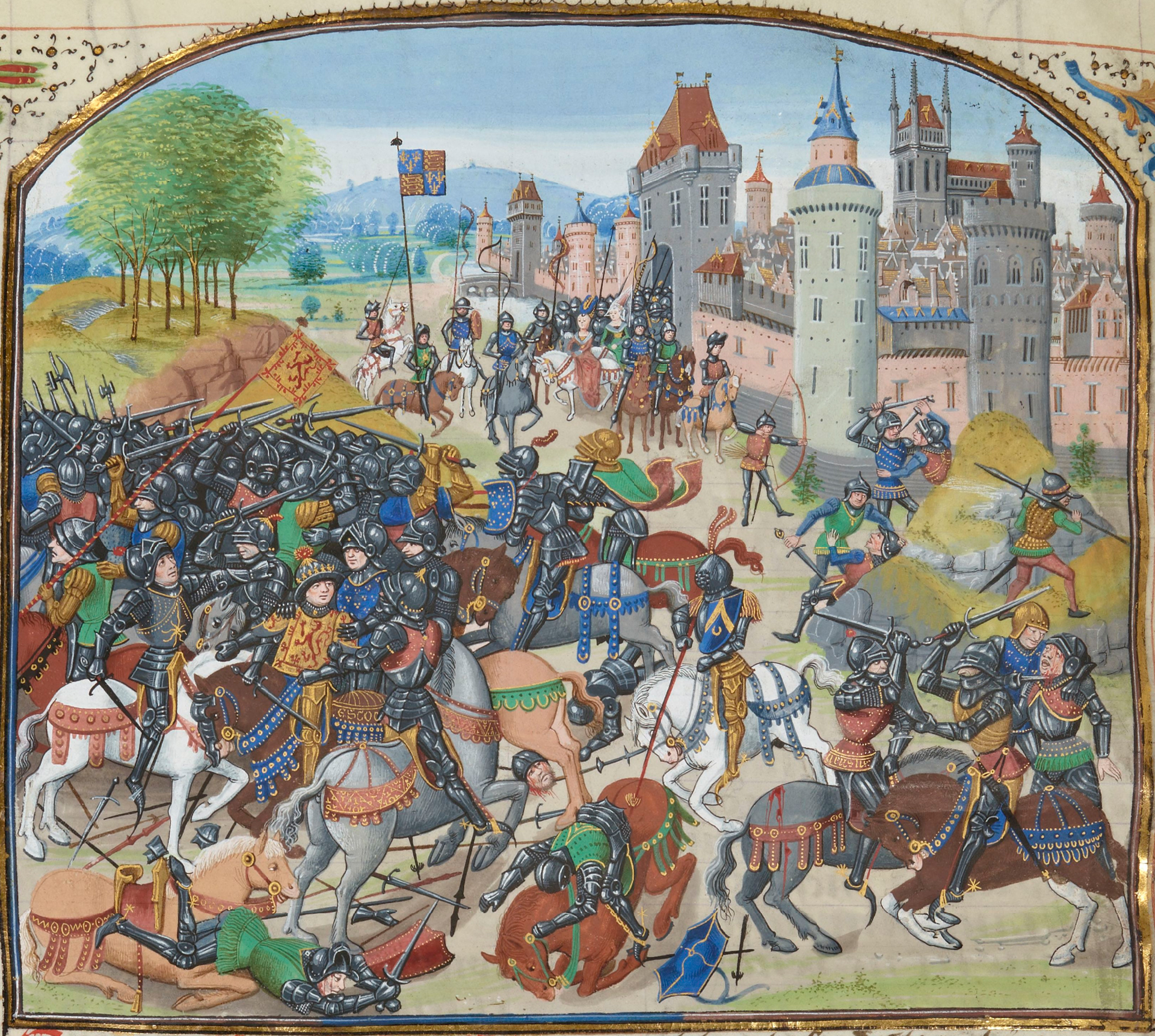
Battle of Neville's Cross, 1346, from the Gruuthuse manuscript.

A first version of the second book of Froissart's Chronicles, which in the author's mind never seems to have been a separate book but rather a continuation covering the period 1378–1385, was probably completed in the late 1380s. It does not seem to have been based on other pre-existing chronicles and is therefore entirely Froissart's own work. Book II, however, includes an extended account of the Flemish revolt against the count in the years 1379–1385, which Froissart had earlier composed as a separate text and which is known as his Chronicle of Flanders. Froissart inserted several official documents into his Chronicle of Flanders, which were also kept in Book II of the Chronicles, including the text of Treaty of Tournai (1385) that re-established peace between the Flemish cities and their count.

As with Book I, Froissart also seems to have rewritten the later books of his Chronicles. Apart from the Chronicle of Flanders, at least four authorial versions of Book II survive. Most manuscripts of Book II contain one of the two earlier versions, which have an almost identical text, except for a small number of chapters in which there are substantial differences. The manuscripts of these two earlier versions have provided the basis for all the modern editions. The two later authorial versions were only identified in this century and remain unedited.

One of the later versions of Book II dates from after 1395 and survives only in the Newberry manuscript that also contains the 'C' version of Book I. The Newberry version of Book II is substantially different from the other known versions and is undoubtedly the result of an extensive authorial reworking of the text, which included the addition of important material that does not appear in the other versions. The Newberry text has not yet been fully edited but it has been partly transcribed for the Online Froissart. The other later version of Book II has been partially transmitted in the manuscript Bruges, Archief van het Grootseminarie, MS 468, which lacks § 1-101 but also contains the text of Book III. The Bruges manuscript largely has the same text as the standard version of Book II, as transmitted in the Leiden manuscript, but also contains a series of chapters that have been reworked by the author. This suggests that the Bruges version must be dated between the standard version and the 'C' version of Book II. Like the Newberry text, it has not been edited. The Bruges manuscript is codicologically connected to the 'Rome' manuscript of Book I. The way changes were made by the scribe in both of these manuscripts suggest that the scribe was Froissart himself and that both of are therefore autograph manuscripts.

A first version of Book III, which covers the years 1385 to 1390, but which also includes extensive flashback to the earlier periods, was possibly completed in 1390 or 1391 and is the one found in nearly all the surviving manuscripts. A second version exists in a two manuscripts (Bruges, Archief van het Grootseminarie, MS 468 and Paris, Bibliothèque nationale de France, MS fr. 2650). This second version is probably a later reworking by Froissart himself: it follows the pattern that can be seen in the different authorial versions of Book II, with many chapters remaining the same and some chapters having been extensively rewritten. There are some differences between the Bruges and Paris manuscripts which indicate that the latter may be a slightly later authorial revision in which the author was experimenting with the textual order.

Book IV, whose text goes up to the year 1400, remains incomplete and was probably, like the 'Rome' version of Book I, written after 1404. It is likely that the abrupt ending of Book IV is to be explained by Froissart's death, which may have occurred while he was writing this part of the Chronicles.

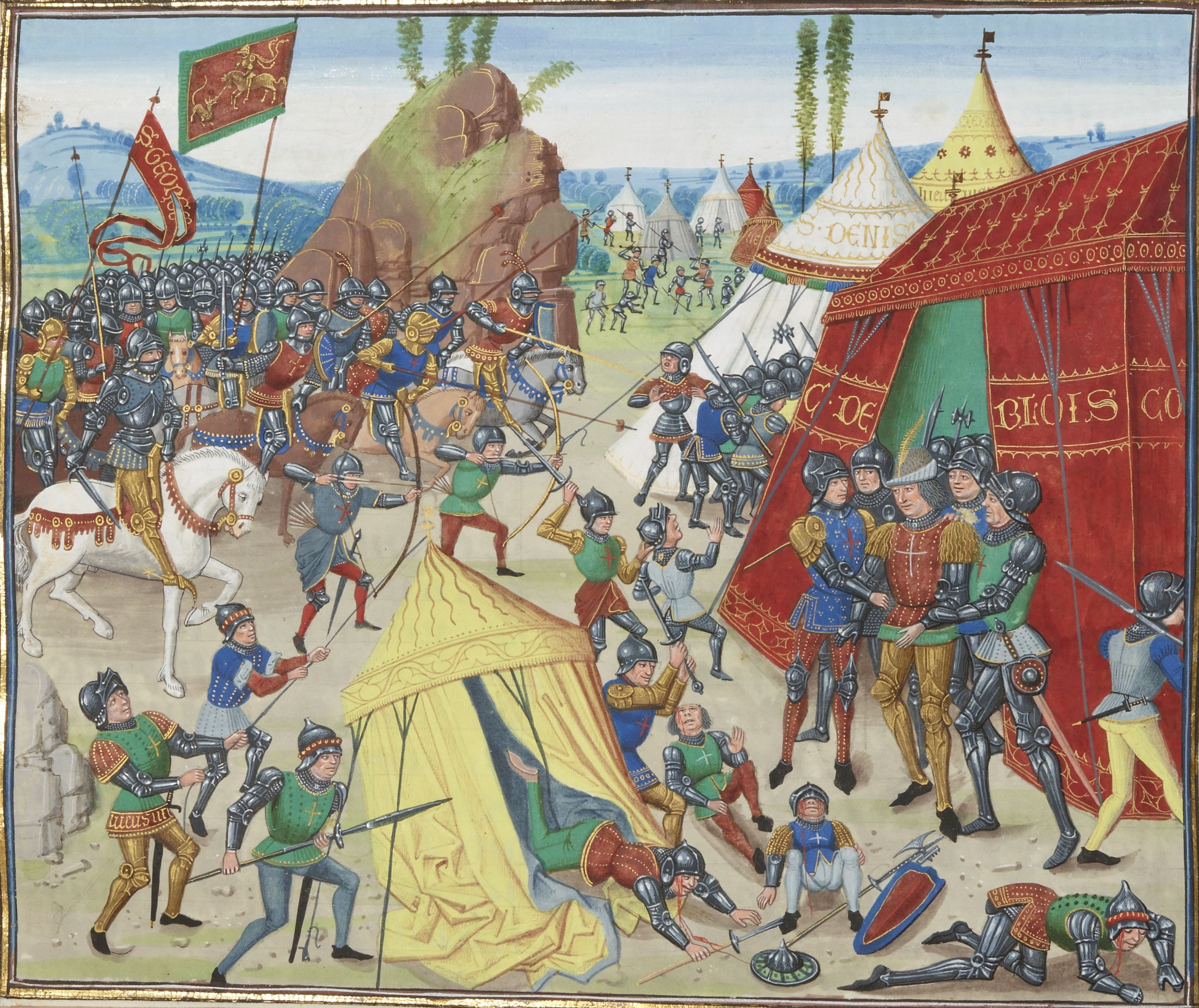
Capture of the Duke of Brittany at the Battle of La Roche-Derrien, 1347

Book IV has been transmitted in 21 manuscripts, all representing a single authorial version. The text shows traces of having been worked over by a 'copy editor', who was not the author but someone who seems to have prepared a text, possibly autograph, for reproduction. Unlike the other three books of the Chronicles, Book IV seems to have remained unknown for a long time, until it was discovered in the second half of the 15th century, when the first manuscript copies of the text were made and the text started to circulate in the court circles of the Dukes of Burgundy.

== Illuminated manuscripts ==
The Chronicles were almost immediately popular among the nobility, and many manuscripts were expensively illuminated. In the first quarter of the 15th century, many illustrated copies of Book I, as well as some copies of Books II and III, were produced by the Parisian booktrade. Nearly half of these surviving copies can be linked to a particular libraire, called Pierre de Liffol. Several artistic hands can be detected in these copies, but two anonymous miniature painters seem to stand out as regular collaborators in Liffol's production: the Boethius Master and the Giac Master.

There was something of a revival in interest from about 1470 in the Burgundian Low Countries, and some of the most extensive cycles of Flemish illumination were produced to illustrate Froissart's Chronicles. Several complete copies of the four books, as well as all the illustrated manuscripts of Book IV, date from this period. Whereas older illustrations are mostly rather simple and formulaic, with decorated backgrounds, the larger images of this later period are often full of detail, and have extensive views of landscape, interiors or cities in their backgrounds. Most of the images here come from this period. One of the most lavishly illuminated copies was commissioned by Louis of Gruuthuse, a Flemish nobleman, in the 1470s. The four volumes of this copy (BnF, Fr 2643-6) contain 110 miniatures painted by some of the best Brugeois artists of the day. Among them is Loiset Lyédet, who has been identified as the painter who executed the miniatures in the first two volumes. Those in the third and fourth volume have been attributed to a collaboration between the Master of Anthony of Burgundy, the Master of the Dresden Prayerbook and the Master of Margaret of York. Many of the illustrations to this entry come from this copy.

== Online copy ==
- Jean Froissart, Chronicles of England, France, and Spain and the adjoining countries, Johnes translation
- The Online Froissart: transcriptions and reproductions of many manuscripts of the Chronicles
