= Bertucat d'Albret =

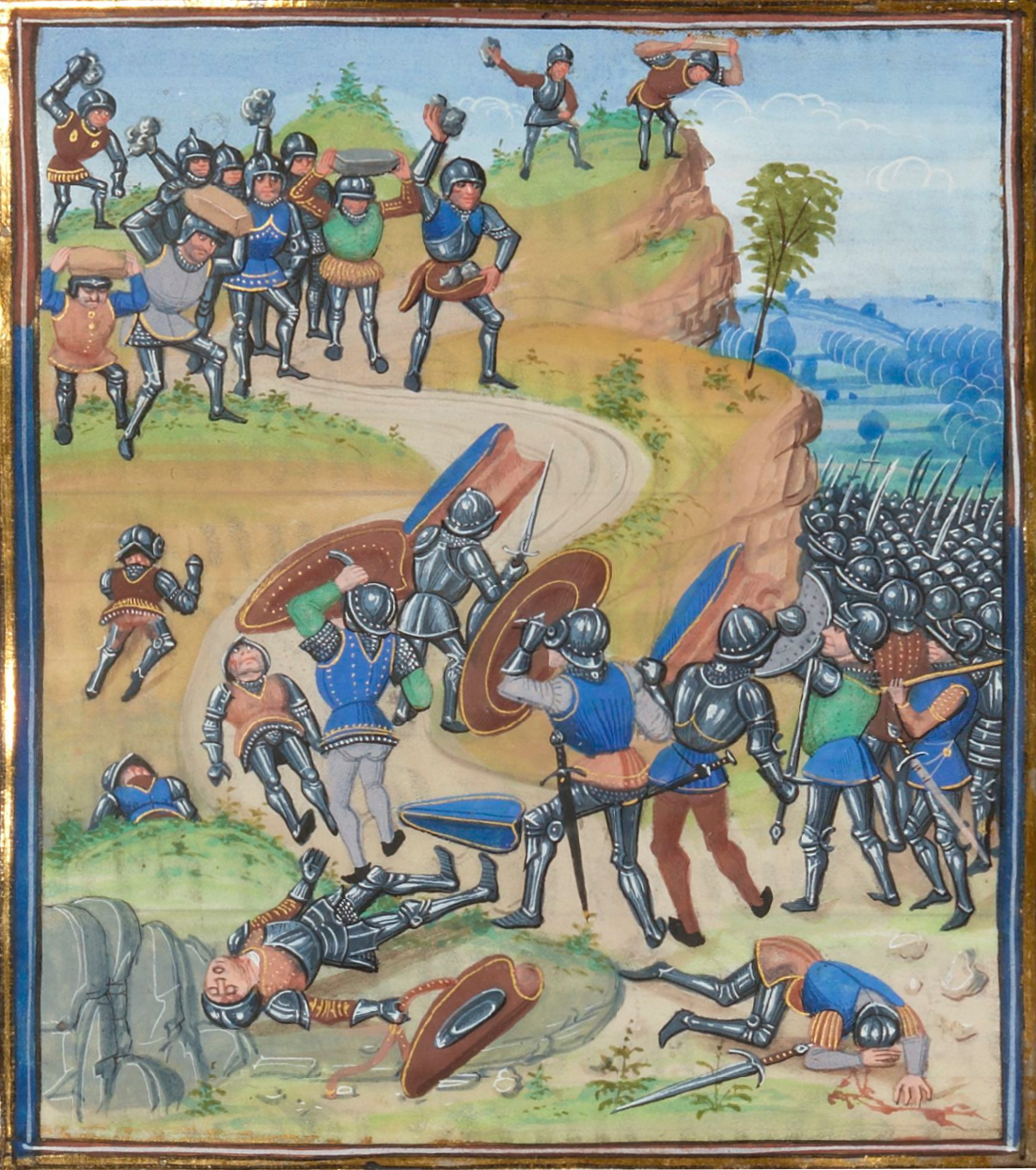
Battle of Brigniais.

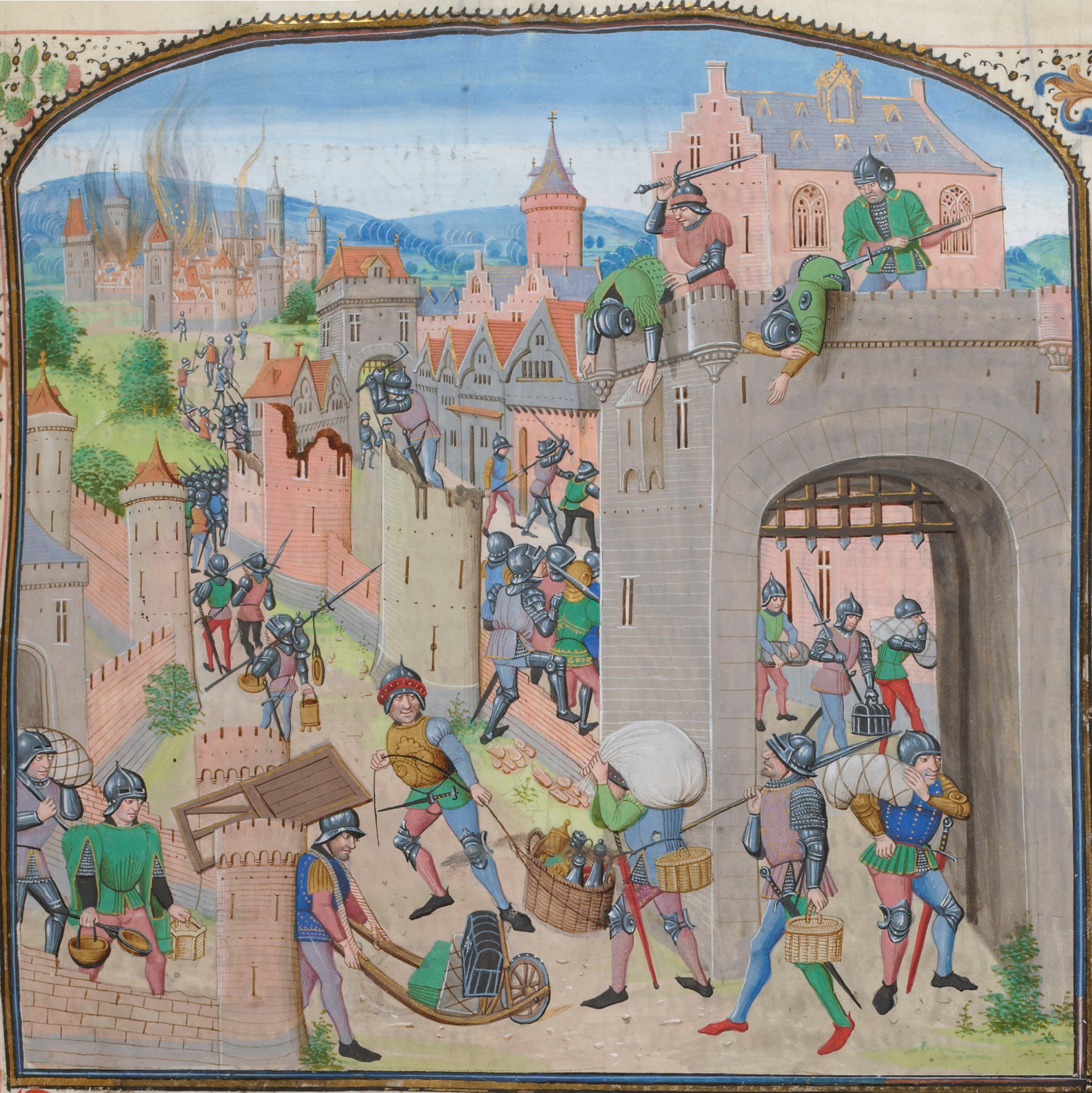
The Tard-Venus pillage Grammont in 1362, from Froissart's Chronicles.

Bertucat d'Albret was a medieval mercenary leader of a bandit army in the Hundred Years' War.

== Family ==
Bertucat d'Albret is an illegitimate son of Bernard Ezy IV sire d'Albret, and half-brother of Arnaud-Amanieu, lord of Montcuq.

== Career ==
Bertucat d'Albret fought at the Battle of Poitiers in 1356 and in 1360 after the Treaty of Brétigny, and without employ, he led a band of brigands, in company with Bertucat d'Albret in 1361 into the Languedoc, Roussillon, Toulouse and Rouergue districts.

In 1362, with Bertucat he took Montbrun, plundered Saint-Flour, Cantal then participated with Petit Meschin, at the Battle of Brignais against Jacques de Bourbon Count of La Marche.

In 1363, when most of the brigands went to go to Italy, he returned to plunder the Languedoc area with Petit Meschin, Louis Rabaud, Arnaud du Solis and Espiote, who together took Brioude on 13 September.

He went to Quercy. In 1357 he appeared in Auvergne and occupied Sermur, which served as a base for his expeditions.

In June 1359, he joined forces with Robert Knolles in Pont-du-Château. In 1361, he is with Bérard d'Albret, perhaps his cousin, in Bas-Languedoc.

In August 1361, he joined forces with Seguin de Badefol in front of Narbonne and they invade Roussillon, then the Toulouse.

Rouergue pays a ransom for their departure.

He was defeated at Launac in 1362. He entered Gévaudan with Seguin de Badefol and took Brioude in September.

In 1365, it makes the castle of Blot and invades the Chalonnais with allies from Gascon.

He beat Olivier de Mauny with the troops of the Prince of Wales at La Ville-Dieu-du-Temple, in August 1366, then he went to Castile with the Black Prince's army.

He returned to Quercy in 1369, in Limousin at the beginning of 1371.

He took Figeac in October 1371, but undertook not to attack the region again for 120 000 francs.

He was imprisoned in 1374 and released at the end of 1376.

He left Bergerac in 1377. In reward for his participation in the war of Castile, he received in 1379 the land of Arberoue and the castle of Roquefort.

In 1380, he took Montferrand in March, Chateauneuf-de-Randon, where the Constable Bertrand Du Guesclin died during the siege, and Chaliers in April.

In 1381, he was in England with Robert Knolles in London alongside Richard II during the revolt of Wat Tyler.

In thanks, the king gave him the barony of Caumont-sur-Garonne.

Back in the south of France, the companies of Bertucat d'Albret occupied eight castles in Quercy ordered by two of his lieutenants, Noli Barbe and Bernard Douat. He also had other garrisons in the neighboring provinces, in Gascony, in the Perigord, in the Agenais and Saintonge.

He was taken prisoner during a skirmish in the summer of 1382.

He died in September 1383. Raymond or Ramonet de Sort, who called himself his nephew, succeeded him.
