= House of Bourbon =

Cadet branch of French Capetian dynasty

Royal House of Bourbon
- Noble house
- Parent house: Capetian dynasty
- Country: France; Spain; Luxembourg; Two Sicilies; Parma
- Etymology: Bourbon
- Founded: 1272; 754 years ago
- Founder: Robert, Count of Clermont
- Current head: Louis Alphonse, Duke of Anjou
- Final ruler: France and Navarre: Charles X (1824–1830); Of the French: Louis Philippe I (1830–1848); Parma: Roberto I (1854–1859); Two Sicilies: Francis II (1859–1861)
- Titles: List: King of France and Navarre; King of Spain; King of Aragon and Castile; King of the Two Sicilies; King of Poland (Note: titular); Grand Duke of Lithuania; Grand Duke of Luxembourg; Dauphin of France; Duke of Bourbon; Duke of Calabria; Duke of Vendôme; Duke of Orléans; Duke of Anjou; Duke of Berry; Duke of Alençon; Duke of Angoulême; Duke of Parma; Duke of Lucca; Prince of Condé; Prince of Conti; Count of La Marche; Count of Soissons; Count of Provence; Count of Artois; Count of Barcelona
- Estates: France; Navarre; Spain; Two Sicilies; Luxembourg; Parma
- Deposition: France (and Navarre until 1830): 1830 (July Revolution); 1848 (February Revolution); Parma: 1859 (Annexed by the Kingdom of Sardinia); Two Sicilies: 1861 (Italian unification); Spain: Glorious revolution of 1868; (Restored in 1874); replaced by republican state (Restored in 1975)
- Branches: List: House of Bourbon-Anjou; Bourbon-Braganza (extinct); Bourbon-Seville; Bourbon-Two Sicilies; Bourbon-Parma; House of Orléans; Orléans-Braganza; Orléans-Galliera; House of Condé (extinct); Bourbon-Conti; Bourbon-Soissons; House of Bourbon-Bhopal (disputed); Illegitimate branches; Bourbon-Busset; Bourbon-Maine (extinct); Bourbon-Penthièvre (extinct); Bourbon-Vendôme (extinct)
- Website: www.louisdebourbon.fr

The House of Bourbon (English: /ˈbʊər.bən/, also UK: /ˈbɔːr.bɒn/; French: [buʁbɔ̃]) is a dynasty that originated in the Kingdom of France as a branch of the Capetian dynasty, the royal House of France. Bourbon kings first ruled France and Navarre in the 16th century. A branch descended from the French Bourbons came to rule Spain in the 18th century and is the current Spanish royal family. Other branches, descended from the Spanish Bourbons, held thrones in Naples, Sicily, and Parma. Today, Spain and Luxembourg have monarchs from the House of Bourbon.

The royal Bourbons originated in 1272, when Robert, the youngest son of King Saint Louis IX of France, married the heiress of the lordship of Bourbon. The house continued for three centuries as a cadet branch, serving as nobles under the direct Capetian and Valois kings.

The senior line of the House of Bourbon became extinct in the male line in 1527 with the death of Duke Charles III of Bourbon in the Sack of Rome. This made the junior Bourbon-Vendôme branch the genealogically senior branch of the House of Bourbon. In 1589, at the death of Henry III of France, the House of Valois became extinct in the male line. Under the Salic law, the head of the House of Bourbon, as the senior representative of the senior-surviving branch of the Capetian dynasty (first prince of the blood), became King of France as Henry IV. Bourbon monarchs then united to France the part of the Kingdom of Navarre north of the Pyrenees, which Henry's father had acquired by marriage in 1555, ruling both until the 1792 overthrow of the monarchy during the French Revolution. Restored briefly in 1814 and definitively in 1815 after the fall of the First French Empire, the senior line of the Bourbons was finally overthrown in the July Revolution of 1830. A cadet Bourbon branch, the House of Orléans, then ruled for 18 years (1830–1848), until it too was overthrown during the French Revolution of 1848.

The House of Condé was a cadet branch of the Bourbons descended from an uncle of Henry IV, and the House of Conti was a cadet line of the Condé branch. Both houses, recognized as princes of the blood, were prominent French noble families, well known for their participation in French affairs, even during exile in the French Revolution, until their respective extinctions in 1830 and 1814. Consequently, since the extinction of the Capetian House of Courtenay in 1733, the Bourbons are the only extant legitimate branch of the House of Capet. Although illegitimate, the House of Braganza traces its line to the House of Capet via descent from Robert II of France through the First House of Burgundy, then through the Portuguese House of Burgundy. Peter I of Portugal fathered an illegitimate son – John I of Portugal, founder of the House of Aviz – who in turn fathered an illegitimate son named Afonso, who in turn founded the extant House of Braganza.

In 1700, upon the death of King Charles II of Spain, the Spanish Habsburgs became extinct in the male line. Under the will of the childless Charles II, the second grandson of King Louis XIV of France was named as his successor, to preclude the union of the thrones of France and Spain. The prince, then Duke of Anjou, became Philip V of Spain. Permanent separation of the French and Spanish thrones was secured when France and Spain ratified Philip's renunciation, for himself and his descendants, of the French throne in the Treaty of Utrecht in 1713, and similar arrangements later kept the Spanish throne separate from those of Naples, Sicily and Parma. The Spanish House of Bourbon (rendered in Spanish as Borbón [boɾˈβon]) has been overthrown and restored several times, reigning 1700–1808, 1813–1868, 1875–1931, and since 1975, the current King of Spain, Felipe VI and the wider royal family belongs to the Bourbon Dynasty, descended directly from Philip V of Spain and Henry IV of France. Bourbons ruled in Naples from 1734 to 1806 and in Sicily from 1735 to 1816, as well as in a unified Kingdom of the Two Sicilies from 1816 to 1861. They also ruled in Parma from 1731 to 1735, 1748 to 1802 and 1847 to 1859, in the Kingdom of Etruria from 1802 to 1807, and in the Duchy of Lucca from 1814 to 1847.

Grand Duchess Charlotte of Luxembourg married Prince Felix of Bourbon-Parma, and thus her successors, who have reigned in Luxembourg since her abdication in 1964, have also been members of the House of Bourbon. Isabel, Princess Imperial of Brazil, regent for her father, Emperor Pedro II of Brazil, married a cadet of the Orléans line and thus their descendants, known as the Orléans-Braganza, were in the line of succession to the Brazilian throne and expected to ascend its throne had the monarchy not been abolished by a coup in 1889. All legitimate, living members of the House of Bourbon, including its cadet branches, are direct agnatic descendants of Henry IV through his son Louis XIII.

== Origins ==
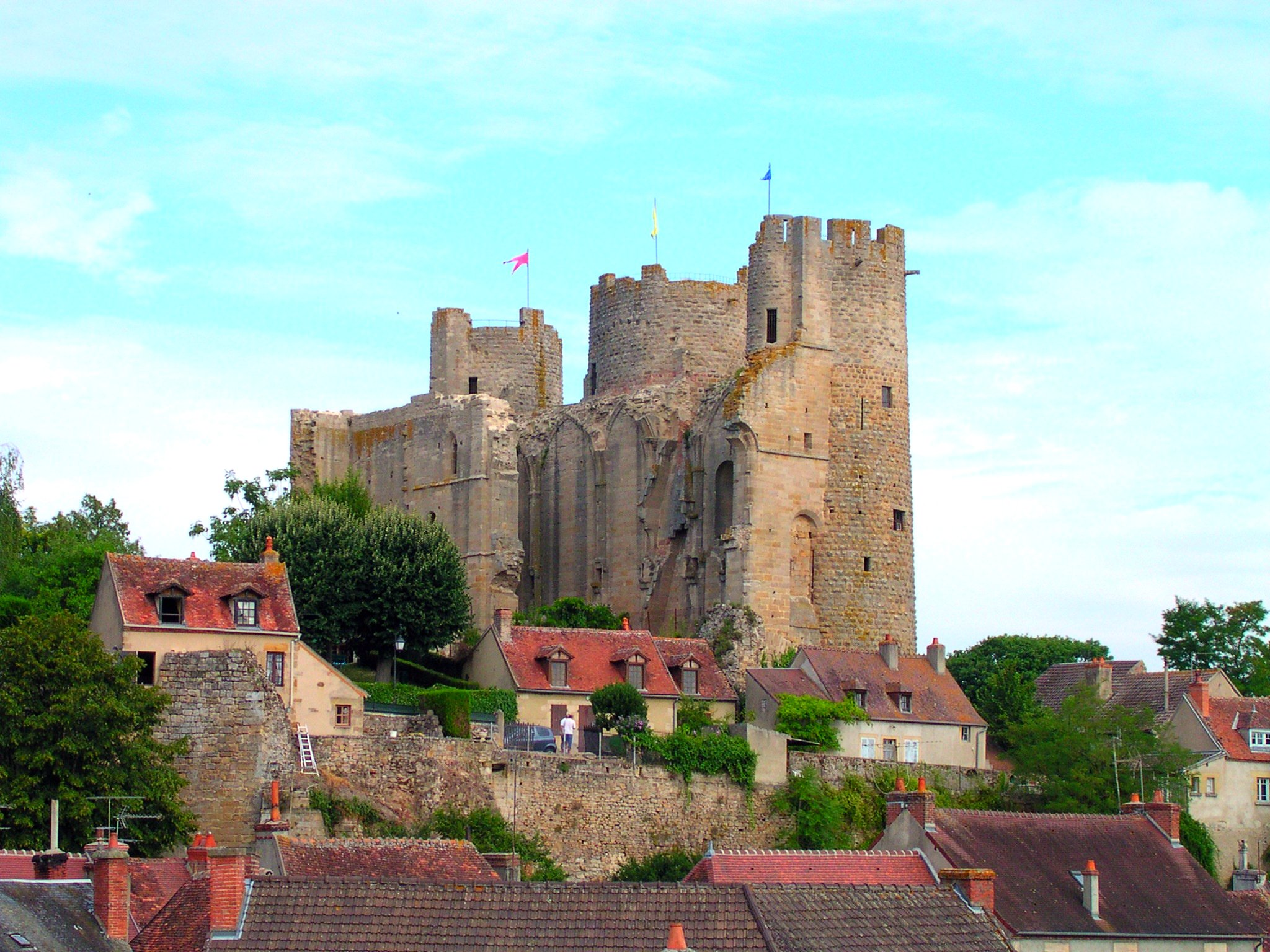
The castle of Bourbon-l'Archambault

The pre-Capetian House of Bourbon was a noble family, dating at least from the beginning of the 13th century, when the estate of Bourbon was ruled by the Sire de Bourbon who was a vassal of the King of France. The term House of Bourbon ("Maison de Bourbon") is sometimes used to refer to this first house and the House of Bourbon-Dampierre, the second family to rule the seigneury.

In 1272, Robert, Count of Clermont, sixth and youngest son of King Louis IX of France, married Beatrix of Bourbon, heiress to the lordship of Bourbon and member of the House of Bourbon-Dampierre. Their son Louis was made Duke of Bourbon in 1327. His descendant, the Constable of France Charles de Bourbon, was the last of the senior Bourbon line when he died in 1527. Because he chose to fight under the banner of Holy Roman Emperor Charles V and lived in exile from France, his title was discontinued after his death.

The remaining line of Bourbons henceforth descended from James I, Count of La Marche, the younger son of Louis I, Duke of Bourbon. With the death of his grandson James II, Count of La Marche in 1438, the senior line of the Count of La Marche became extinct. All future Bourbons would descend from James II's younger brother, Louis, who became the Count of Vendôme through his mother's inheritance. In 1525, at the death of Charles IV, Duke of Alençon, all of the princes of the blood royal were Bourbons; all remaining members of the House of Valois were members of the king's immediate family.

In 1514, Charles, Count of Vendôme had his title raised to Duke of Vendôme. His son Antoine became King of Navarre, on the northern side of the Pyrenees, by marriage in 1555. Two of Antoine's younger brothers were Cardinal Archbishop Charles de Bourbon and the French and Huguenot general Louis de Bourbon, 1st Prince of Condé. Louis' male-line descendants, the Princes de Condé, survived until 1830. Finally, in 1589, the House of Valois died out and Antoine's son Henry III of Navarre became Henry IV of France.

== List of Bourbons ==
Dukes of Bourbon

Counts of La Marche

Counts of Vendôme

Dukes of Vendôme

Bourbon Kings of Navarre to 1589 (Henry IV)

Bourbon Kings of Navarre and France to 1789

Princes of Condé

Dukes of Orléans

Dukes of Anjou (House of Bourbon-Anjou)

House of Bourbon-Parma

=== Bourbon branches ===
- House of Clermont, later called House of Bourbon
  - House of the Dukes of Bourbon (extinct 1521 in total; extinct 1503 in the male line)
    - House of Bourbon-Lavedan (illegitimate), extinct 1744
    - House of Bourbon-Busset (non-dynastic)
    - House of Bourbon-Roussillon (illegitimate), extinct 1510
    - House of Bourbon-Montpensier, Counts of Montpensier (extinct 1527)
  - House of Bourbon-La Marche (extinct 1438)
    - House of Bourbon-Vendôme
      - House of Bourbon, Kings of France
        - House of Artois (extinct 1883)
        - House of Bourbon, Kings of Spain
          - Carlists (extinct 1936)
          - Alfonsines
            - House of Bourbon-Anjou
            - House of Bourbon, Kings of Spain
          - House of Bourbon-Seville
            - House of Bourbon-Santa Elena
          - House of Bourbon-Two Sicilies
          - House of Bourbon-Braganza (extinct 1979)
          - House of Bourbon-Parma
            - House of Luxembourg-Nassau
        - House of Bourbon-Maine (illegitimate), extinct 1775
        - House of Bourbon-Penthièvre (illegitimate), extinct 1793
        - House of Orléans
          - House of Orléans-Braganza
          - House of Orléans-Galliera
        - House of Bourbon-Vendôme (illegitimate), extinct 1727
      - House of Bourbon-Condé (extinct 1830)
        - House of Bourbon-Conti (extinct 1814)
        - House of Bourbon-Soissons (extinct 1692 in total; extinct 1641 in the male line)
      - House of Bourbon-Saint Pol (extinct 1601 in total; extinct 1546 in the male line)
      - House of Bourbon-Montpensier, Dukes of Montpensier (extinct 1693 in total; extinct 1608 in the male line)
    - House of Bourbon-Carency (extinct 1520)
      - House of Bourbon-Duisant (extinct 1530)
    - House of Bourbon-Préaux (extinct 1442)

Family from India's claim to be a branch and their claim to The "Throne of France"

- Bourbons of India, claim to be descendants of Charles III, Duke of Bourbon, of the first House of Bourbon-Montpensier.

As per the latest research carried out by Prince Michael of Greece and incorporated in his historical novel, Le Rajah Bourbon, Balthazar Napoleon IV de Bourbon from India is the senior heir in line to the French throne.

== France ==
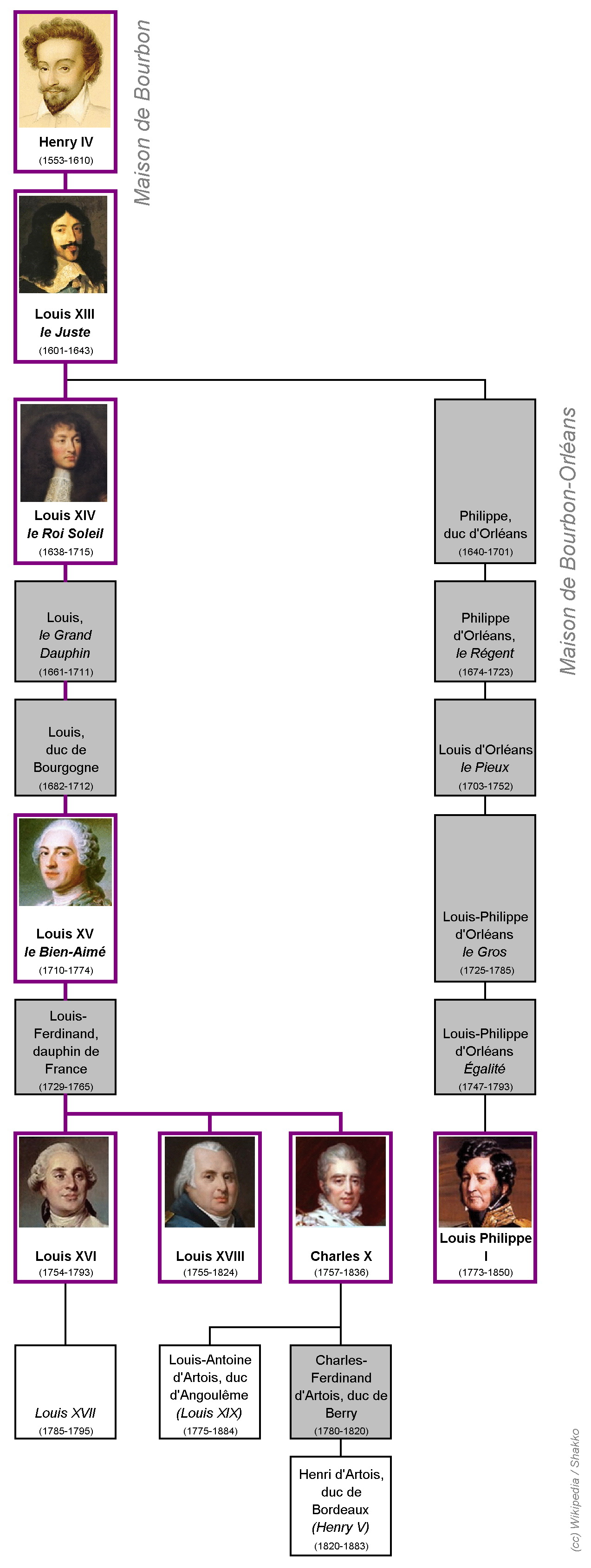
French kings from House of Bourbon. Family tree

=== Rise of Henry IV ===
The first Bourbon king of France was Henry IV. He was born on 13 December 1553 in the Kingdom of Navarre. Antoine de Bourbon, his father, was a ninth-generation descendant of King Louis IX of France. Jeanne d'Albret, his mother, was the Queen of Navarre and niece of King Francis I of France. He was baptized Catholic, but raised Calvinist. After his father was killed in 1562, he became Duke of Vendôme at the age of 10, with Admiral Gaspard de Coligny (1519–1572) as his regent. Seven years later, the young duke became the nominal leader of the Huguenots after the death of his uncle the Prince de Condé in 1569.

Henry succeeded to Navarre as Henry III when his mother died in 1572. That same year Catherine de' Medici, mother of King Charles IX of France, arranged for the marriage of her daughter, Margaret of Valois, to Henry, ostensibly to advance peace between Catholics and Huguenots. Many Huguenots gathered in Paris for the wedding on 24 August, but were ambushed and slaughtered by Catholics in the St. Bartholomew's Day Massacre. Henry saved his own life by converting to Catholicism. He repudiated his conversion in 1576 and resumed his leadership of the Huguenots.

The period from 1576 to 1584 was relatively calm in France, with the Huguenots consolidating control of much of the south with only occasional interference from the royal government. Extended civil war erupted again in 1584, when François, Duke of Anjou, younger brother of King Henry III of France, died, leaving Navarre next in line for the throne. Thus began the War of the Three Henrys, as Henry of Navarre, Henry III, and the ultra-Catholic leader, Henry of Guise, fought a confusing three-cornered struggle for dominance. After Henry III was assassinated on 31 July 1589, Navarre claimed the throne as the first Bourbon king of France, Henry IV.

Much of Catholic France, organized into the Catholic League, refused to recognize a Protestant monarch and instead recognized Henry IV's uncle, Charles, Cardinal de Bourbon, as rightful king, and the civil war continued. Henry won a crucial victory at Ivry on 14 March 1590 and, following the death of the Cardinal the same year, the forces of the League lacked an obvious Catholic candidate for the throne and divided into various factions. Nevertheless, as a Protestant, Henry IV was unable to take Paris, a Catholic stronghold, or to decisively defeat his enemies, now supported by the Spanish. He reconverted to Catholicism in 1593 and was crowned king retroactively to 1589 at the Cathedral of Chartres on 27 February 1594.

=== Early Bourbons in France ===
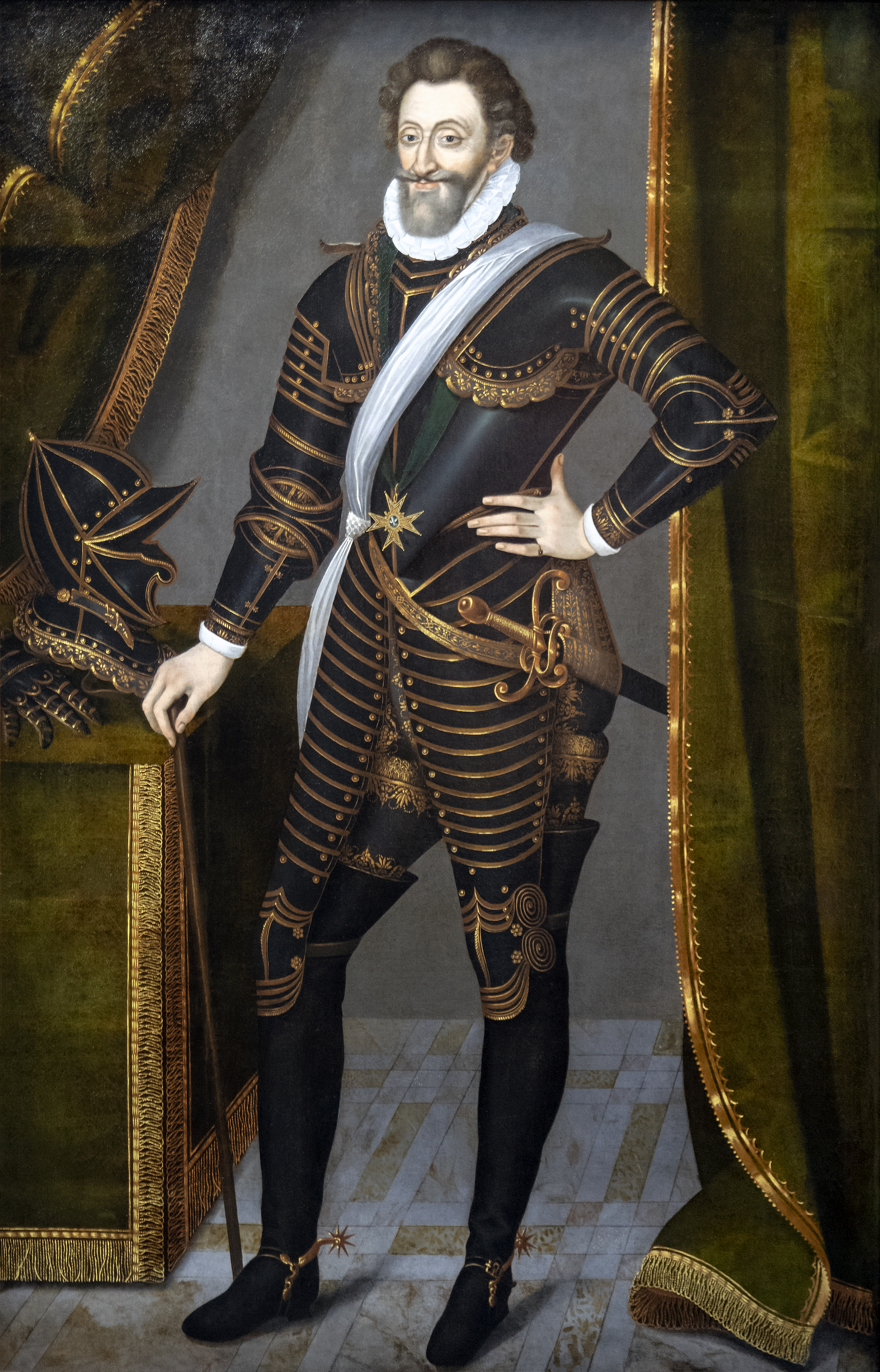
Henry IV of France, the first Bourbon King of France

Henry granted the Edict of Nantes on 13 April 1598, establishing Catholicism as an official state religion but also granting the Huguenots a measure of religious tolerance and political freedom short of full equality with the practice of Catholicism. This compromise ended the religious wars in France. That same year the Treaty of Vervins ended the war with Spain, adjusted the Spanish-French border, and resulted in a belated recognition by Spain of Henry as king of France.

Ably assisted by Maximilien de Béthune, Duke of Sully, Henry reduced the land tax known as the taille; promoted agriculture, public works, construction of highways, and the first French canal; started such important industries as the tapestry works of the Gobelins; and intervened in favor of Protestants in the duchies and earldoms along the German frontier. This last was to be the cause of his assassination.

Henry's marriage to Margaret, which had produced no heir, was annulled in 1599, and he married Marie de' Medici, niece of the grand duke of Tuscany. A son, Louis, was born to them in 1601. Henry IV was assassinated on 14 May 1610 in Paris. Louis XIII was only nine years old when he succeeded his father. He was to prove a weak ruler; his reign was effectively a series of distinct regimes, depending who held the effective reins of power. At first, Marie de' Medici, his mother, served as regent and advanced a pro-Spanish policy. To deal with the financial troubles of France, Louis summoned the Estates General in 1614; this would be the last time that body met until the eve of the French Revolution. Marie arranged the 1615 marriage of Louis to Anne of Austria, the daughter of King Philip III of Spain.

In 1617, Louis conspired with Charles d'Albert, 1st Duke of Luynes to dispense with her influence, having her favorite Concino Concini assassinated on 26 April of that year. After some years of weak government by Louis's favorites, the King made Cardinal Richelieu, a former protégé of his mother, the chief minister of France in 1624.

Richelieu advanced an anti-Habsburg policy. He arranged for Louis' sister, Henrietta Maria, to marry King Charles I of England, on 11 May 1625. Her pro-Catholic propaganda in England was one of the contributing factors to the English Civil War. Richelieu, as ambitious for France and the French monarchy as for himself, laid the ground for the absolute monarchy that would last in France until the Revolution. He wanted to establish a dominating position for France in Europe, and he wanted to unify France under the monarchy. He established the role of intendants, non-noble men whose arbitrary powers of administration were granted (and revocable) by the monarch, superseding many of the traditional duties and privileges of the noble governors.

Although it required a succession of internal military campaigns, Richelieu disarmed the fortified Huguenot towns that Henry had allowed. He involved France in the Thirty Years' War (1618–1648) against the Habsburgs by concluding an alliance with Sweden in 1631 and, actively, in 1635. He died in 1642 before the conclusion of that conflict, having groomed Cardinal Mazarin as a successor. Louis XIII outlived him but by one year, dying in 1643 at the age of forty-two. After a childless marriage for twenty-three years his queen, Anne, delivered a son on 5 September 1638, whom he named Louis after himself. In the mid-17th century, the Bourbon monarchy had a faulty system for finance and taxation. Their lacking a national bank led to them taking short-term loans, and ordering financial agents to make payments in advance or in excess of tax revenues collected.

=== Louis XIV and Louis XV ===
Royal Coat of arms of the Kingdom of France and Navarre.

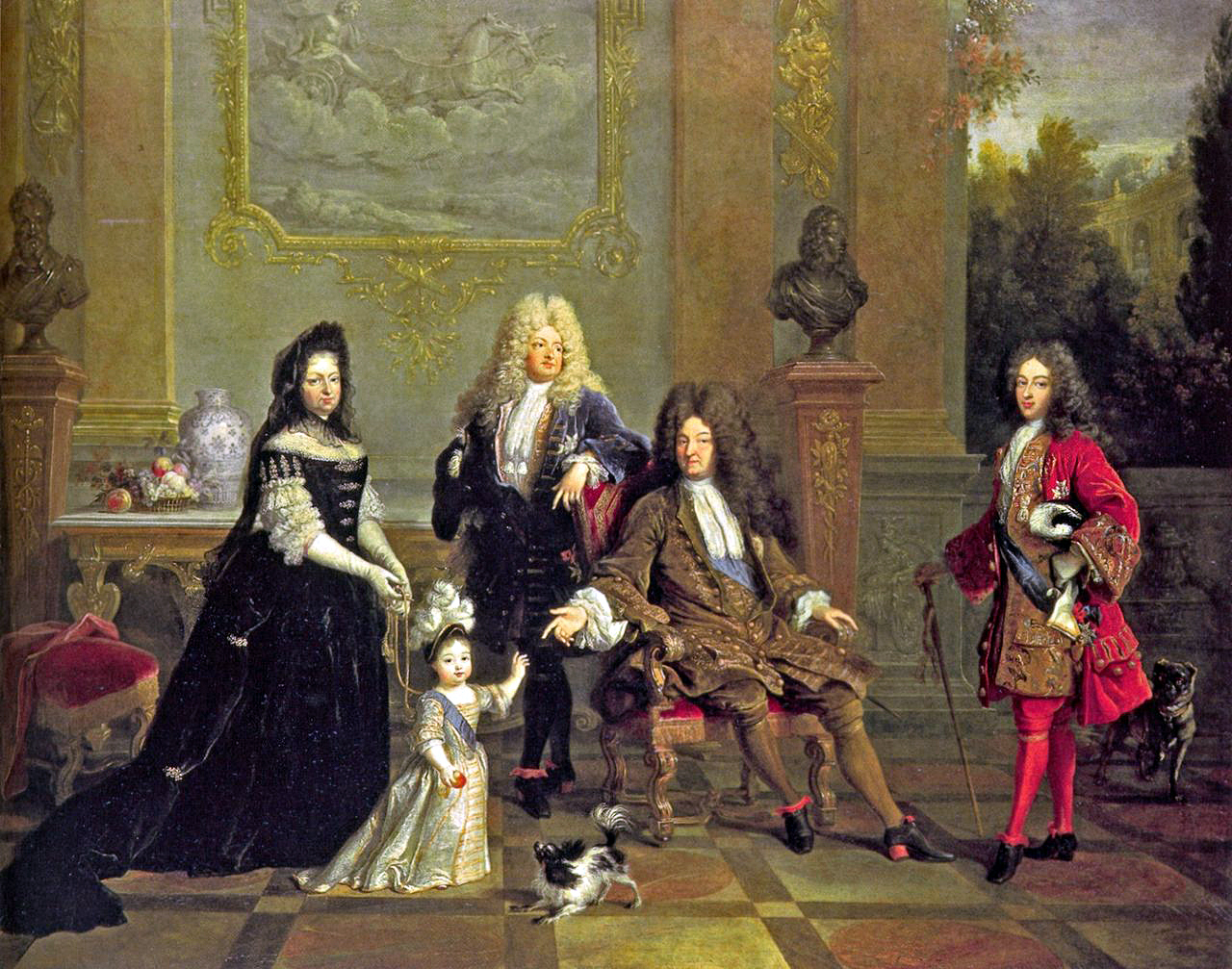
Dynastic group portrait of Louis XIV (seated) with his son Louis the Grand Dauphin (to the left), his grandson Louis, Duke of Burgundy (to the right), his great-grandson the duc d'Anjou, later Louis XV, and Madame de Ventadour, his governess, who commissioned this painting some years later; busts of Henry IV and Louis XIII in the background.

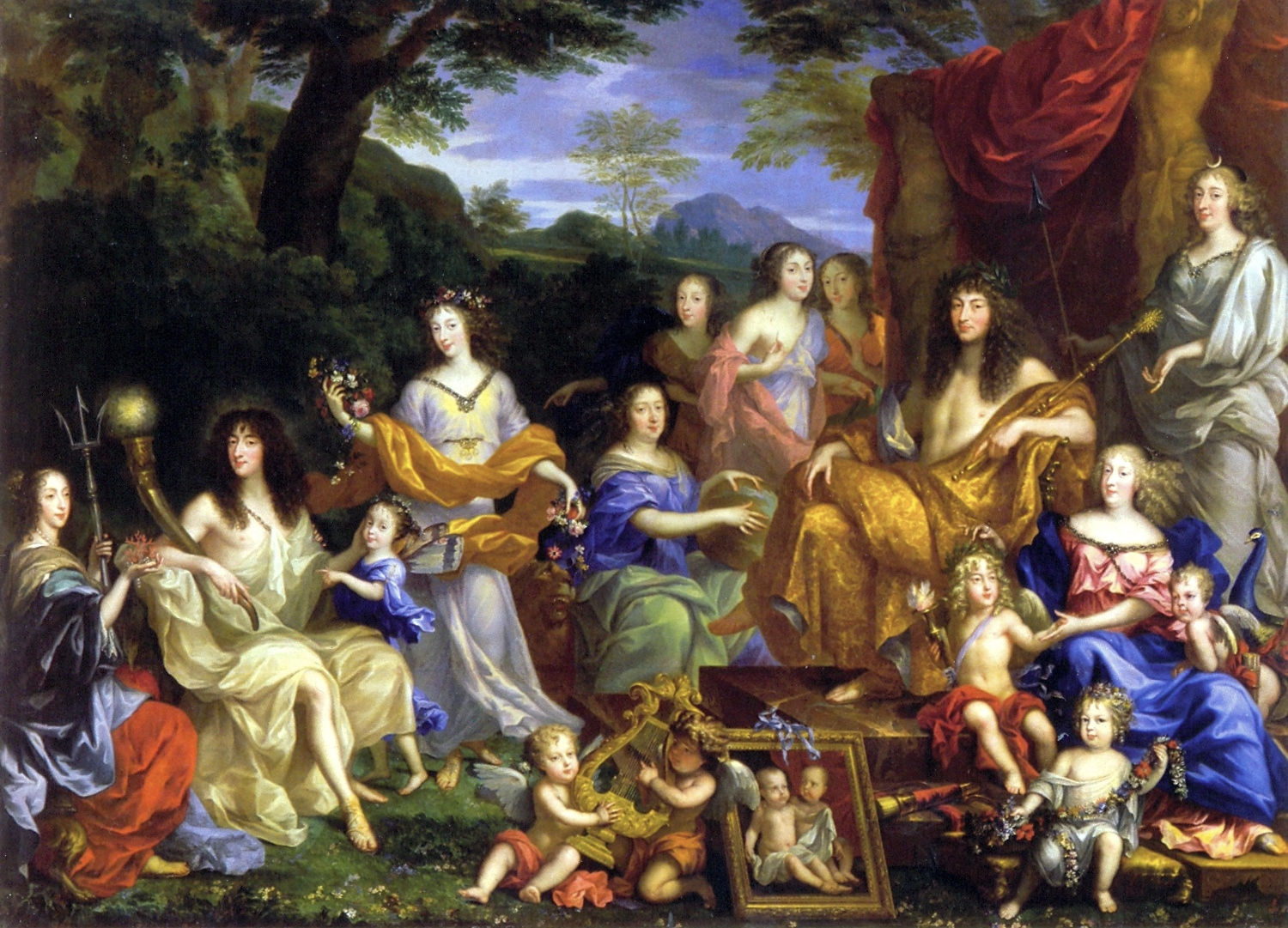
A posthumous painting commissioned around 1670 by Philippe I, Duke of Orléans. It shows the French Bourbon family around that time. It includes: Henrietta Maria of France (d. 1669), exiled Queen of England; Philippe himself, founder of the House of Orléans; his first wife Princess Henriette (d. 1670); the couple's first daughter Marie Louise d'Orléans (later Queen of Spain); Anne of Austria (d. 1666); the Orléans daughters of Gaston, Duke of Orléans; Louis XIV; the Dauphin of France with his wife Maria Theresa of Spain with her third daughter Marie-Thérèse, called Madame Royale (died 1672) and her second son Philippe-Charles de France, duc d'Anjou (d. 1671). The first daughter of Gaston stands on the far right: Anne Marie Louise d'Orléans. The picture frame with the two children are the other two daughters of Louis and Maria Theresa who died in 1662 and 1664.

Louis XIV succeeded his father at four years of age; he would go on to become the most powerful king in French history. His mother Anne served as his regent with her favorite Jules, Cardinal Mazarin, as chief minister. When Louis was age 7, Nicolas de Neufville de Villeroy became governor of the young king. The main childhood places of Louis XIV were the Palais-Royal and the nearby Hôtel de Villeroy. Mazarin continued the policies of Richelieu, bringing the Thirty Years' War to a successful conclusion in 1648 and defeating the nobility's challenge to royal absolutism in a series of civil wars known as the Frondes. He continued to war with Spain until 1659.

In that year the Treaty of the Pyrenees was signed signifying a major shift in power, France had replaced Spain as the dominant state in Europe. The treaty called for an arranged marriage between Louis and his cousin Maria Theresa, a daughter of King Philip IV of Spain by his first wife Elisabeth, the sister of Louis XIII. They were married in 1660 and had a son, Louis, in 1661. Mazarin died on 9 March 1661 and it was expected that Louis would appoint another chief minister, as had become the tradition, but instead he shocked the country by announcing he would rule alone.

For six years Louis reformed the finances of his state and built formidable armed forces. France fought a series of wars from 1667 onward and gained some territory on its northern and eastern borders. Maria Theresa died in 1683 and the next year he secretly married the devoutly Catholic Françoise d'Aubigné, Marquise de Maintenon. Louis XIV began to persecute Protestants, undoing the religious tolerance established by his grandfather Henry IV, culminating in his revocation of the Edict of Nantes in 1685.

The last war waged by Louis XIV proved to be one of the most important to dynastic Europe. In 1700, King Charles II of Spain, a Habsburg, died without a son. Louis's only legitimate son, the Grand Dauphin, as the late king's nephew, was the closest heir; and Charles willed the kingdom to the Dauphin's second son, the Duke of Anjou. Other powers, particularly the Austrian Habsburgs, who had the next closest claims, objected to such a vast increase in French power.

Initially, most of the other powers were willing to accept Anjou's reign as Philip V, but Louis's mishandling of their concerns soon drove the English, Dutch and other powers to join the Austrians in a coalition against France. The War of the Spanish Succession began in 1701 and raged for 12 years. In the end Louis's grandson was recognized as king of Spain, but he was obliged to agree to the forfeiture of succession rights in France, the Spanish Habsburgs' other European territories were largely ceded to Austria, and France was nearly bankrupted by the cost of the struggle. Louis died on 1 September 1715 ending his seventy-two-year reign, the longest in European history.

The reign of Louis XIV was so long that he outlived both his son and eldest grandson. He was succeeded by his great-grandson Louis XV. Louis XV was born on 15 February 1710 and was thus aged only five at his ascension, the third Louis in a row to become king of France before the age of thirteen (Louis XIII became king at 9, Louis XIV at almost 5 and himself at 5). Initially, the regency was held by Philippe, Duke of Orléans, Louis XIV's nephew, as nearest adult male to the throne. This Régence was seen as a period of greater individual expression, manifested in secular, artistic, literary and colonial activity, in contrast to the austere latter years of Louis XIV's reign.

Following Orléans' death in 1723, the Duke of Bourbon, representative of the Bourbon-Condé cadet line, became prime minister. It was expected that Louis would marry his cousin, the daughter of King Philip V of Spain, but this engagement was broken by the duke in 1725 so that Louis could marry Marie Leszczyńska, the daughter of Stanislas, former king of Poland. Bourbon's motive appears to have been a desire to produce an heir as soon as possible so as to reduce the chances of a succession dispute between Philip V and the Duke of Orléans in the event of the sickly king's death. Maria was already an adult woman at the time of the marriage, while the infanta was still a young girl.

Nevertheless, Bourbon's action brought a very negative response from Spain, and for his incompetence Bourbon was soon replaced by Cardinal André-Hercule de Fleury, the young king's tutor, in 1726. Fleury was a peace-loving man who intended to keep France out of war, but circumstances presented themselves that made this impossible. The first cause of these wars came in 1733 when Augustus II, the elector of Saxony and king of Poland died. With French support, Stanislas was again elected king. This brought France into conflict with Russia and Austria who supported Augustus III of Poland, Elector of Saxony and son of Augustus II.

Stanislas lost the Polish crown, but he was given the Duchy of Lorraine as compensation, which would pass to France after his death in 1766. Next came the War of the Austrian Succession in 1740 in which France supported King Frederick the Great of Prussia against Maria Theresa, Archduchess of Austria and Queen of Hungary. Fleury died in 1743 before the conclusion of the war.

Shortly after Fleury's death in 1745 Louis was influenced by his mistress the Marquise de Pompadour to reverse the policy of France in 1756 by creating an alliance with Austria against Prussia in the Seven Years' War. The war was a disaster for France, which lost most of her overseas possessions to the British in the Treaty of Paris (1763). Maria, his wife, died in 1768 and Louis himself died on 10 May 1774.

=== French Revolution ===
Louis XVI had become the Dauphin of France upon the death of his father Louis, the son of Louis XV, in 1765. He married Marie Antoinette of Austria, a daughter of Holy Roman Empress Maria Theresa, in 1770. Louis intervened in the American Revolution against Britain in 1778, but he is most remembered for his role in the French Revolution. France was in financial turmoil and Louis was forced to convene the Estates-General on 5 May 1789.

They formed the National Assembly and forced Louis to accept a constitution that limited his powers on 14 July 1789. He tried to flee France in June 1791, but was captured. The French monarchy was abolished on 21 September 1792 and a republic was proclaimed. The chain of Bourbon monarchs begun in 1589 was broken. Louis XVI was executed on 21 January 1793.

Marie Antoinette and her son, Louis, were held as prisoners. Many French royalists proclaimed him Louis XVII, but he never reigned. She was executed on 16 October 1793. He died of tuberculosis on 8 June 1795 at the age of ten while in captivity.

The French Revolutionary Wars and Napoleonic Wars spread nationalism and anti-absolutism throughout Europe, and the other Bourbon monarchs were threatened. Ferdinand IV was forced to flee from Naples in 1806 when Emperor Napoleon deposed him and installed his brother, Joseph, as king. Ferdinand continued to rule from Sicily until 1815.

Napoleon conquered Parma in 1800 and compensated the Bourbon duke with Etruria, a new kingdom he created from the Grand Duchy of Tuscany. It was short-lived, counting only two monarchs, Louis and Louis II, as Napoleon annexed Etruria in 1807.

King Charles IV of Spain had been an ally of France. He succeeded his father, Charles III, in 1788. At first he declared war on France on 7 March 1793, but he made peace on 22 June 1795. This peace became an alliance on 19 August 1796. His chief minister, Manuel de Godoy convinced Charles that his son, Ferdinand, was plotting to overthrow him. Napoleon exploited the situation and invaded Spain in March 1808. This led to an uprising that forced Charles to abdicate on 19 March 1808 in favor of his son, who became Ferdinand VII. Napoleon forced Ferdinand to return the crown to Charles on 30 April and then convinced Charles to relinquish it to him on 10 May 1808. In turn, he gave it to his brother, Joseph, king of Naples on 6 June 1808. Joseph abandoned Naples to Joachim Murat, the husband of Napoleon's sister. This was very unpopular in Spain and resulted in the Peninsular War, a struggle that would contribute to the downfall of Napoleon.

=== Bourbon Restoration ===
The standard of the French royal family under the Ancien Régime and the restoration period.

With the abdication of Napoleon on 11 April 1814 the Bourbon dynasty was restored to the Kingdom of France in the person of Louis XVIII, brother of Louis XVI. Napoleon escaped from exile and Louis fled in March 1815. Louis was again restored after the Battle of Waterloo on 7 July 1815.

The conservative elements of Europe dominated the post-Napoleonic age, but the values of the French Revolution could not be easily swept aside. Louis granted a constitution on 14 June 1814 to appease the liberals, but the ultra-royalist party, led by his brother, Charles, continued to influence his reign. When he died in 1824 his brother became king as Charles X much to the dismay of French liberals. In a saying ascribed to Talleyrand, "they had learned nothing and forgotten nothing."

==== Aftermath ====
Charles passed several laws that appealed to the upper class but angered the middle class. The situation came to a head when he appointed a new minister on 5 August 1829 who did not have the confidence of the Chamber of Deputies. The chamber censured the king on 18 March 1830 and in response Charles proclaimed the July Ordinances on 25 July 1830 intended to silence criticism against him. This resulted in the July Revolution.

Coat of arms of Louis Philippe of the Orléanist cadet branch, French king during the July Monarchy 1830–48 (with the revolutionary Tricolour flag and the Napoleonic Order of the Legion of Honour)

As a compromise the crown was offered to Louis Philippe, Duke of Orléans, a descendant of the brother of Louis XIV, and the head of the Orléanist cadet branch of the Bourbons. Agreeing to reign constitutionally and under the tricolour, he was proclaimed King of the French on 7 August 1830. The resulting regime, known as the July Monarchy, lasted until the Revolution of 1848. The Bourbon monarchy in France ended on 24 February 1848, when Louis Philippe was forced to abdicate and the short-lived Second Republic was established.

Some Legitimists refused to recognize the Orléanist monarchy. After the death of Charles in 1836 his son was proclaimed Louis XIX, though this title was never formally recognized. Charles' grandson Henri, Count of Chambord, the last Bourbon claimant of the French crown, was proclaimed by some Henry V, but the French monarchy was never restored.

Following the 1870 collapse of the Second French Empire of Emperor Napoleon III, Henri was offered a restored throne. However Chambord refused to accept the throne unless France abandoned the revolution-inspired tricolour and accepted what he regarded as the true Bourbon flag of France, featuring the fleur-de-lis. The tricolour, originally associated with the French Revolution and the First Republic, had been used by the July Monarchy, the Second Republic and both Empires; the French National Assembly could not possibly agree.

A temporary Third Republic was established, while monarchists waited for the comte de Chambord to die and for the succession to pass to Prince Philippe, Count of Paris, who was willing to accept the tricolour. Henri lived until 1883, by which time public opinion had come to accept the republic as the "form of government that divides us least." His death without issue marked the extinction of the main line of the French Bourbons. Thus the head of the House of Bourbon became Juan, Count of Montizón of the Spanish line of the house who was also Carlist claimant to the throne of Spain, and had become the senior male of the dynasty by primogeniture. His heir as eldest Bourbon and head of the house is today Louis Alphonse, Duke of Anjou, sometimes regarded as Louis XX.

However the terms of the Peace of Utrecht forbade the descendants of Philip V of Spain from inheriting the throne of France, therefore many monarchists recognised the Orléans line as heirs to the French throne.

By an ordinance of Louis Philippe I of 13 August 1830, it was decided that the king's children (and his sister) would continue to bear the arms of Orléans, that Louis-Philippe's eldest son Ferdinand, as Prince Royal, would bear the title of Duke of Orléans, that the younger sons would continue to have their existing titles, and that the sister and daughters of the king would be styled Royal Highness and "d'Orléans," but the Orléans dynasts did not take the name "of France."

== Bourbons of Spain and Italy ==
Arms of the current King of Spain of the House of Bourbon

=== Philip V ===
The Spanish branch of the House of Bourbon, also known as the House of Bourbon-Anjou, was founded by Philip V. He was born in 1683 at Versailles, the second son of the Grand Dauphin, who was eldest son of Louis XIV. He was Duke of Anjou and probably never expected to be raised to a rank higher than that. However, King Charles II of Spain, dying without issue, willed the throne to his grand-nephew the Duke of Anjou, who was the younger grandson of his eldest sister Marie-Thérèse, who had married Louis XIV.

The prospect of Bourbons on both the French and Spanish thrones was resisted as creating an imbalance of power in Europe by its powers and, upon Charles II's death on 1 November 1700, a Grand Alliance of European nations united against Philip. This was known as the War of the Spanish Succession. In the Treaty of Utrecht, signed on 11 April 1713, Philip was recognized as king of Spain but his renunciation of succession rights to France was affirmed and, of the Spanish Empire's other European territories, Sicily was ceded to Savoy, and the Spanish Netherlands, Milan, and Naples were allotted to the Austrian Habsburgs.

Philip had two sons by his first wife. After her death, he married Elisabeth Farnese, niece of Francesco Farnese, Duke of Parma, in 1714. She presented Philip with three sons, for whom she had ambitions of securing Italian crowns. She therefore induced Philip to occupy Sardinia and Sicily in 1717.

A Quadruple Alliance of Britain, France, Austria and the Netherlands was organized on 2 August 1718 to stop him. In the Treaty of The Hague, signed on 17 February 1720, Philip renounced his conquests of Sardinia and Sicily, but he assured the ascension of his eldest son by Elisabeth to the Duchy of Parma upon the reigning duke's death. Philip abdicated in January 1724 in favor of Louis I, his eldest son with his first wife, but Louis died in August and Philip resumed the crown.

When the War of the Polish Succession began in 1733, Philip and Elisabeth saw another opportunity to advance the claims of their sons and recover at least part of the former possessions of the Spanish crown on the Italian peninsula. Philip signed the Family Compact with Louis XV, his nephew and king of France. Charles, Duke of Parma since 1731, invaded Naples. At the conclusion of peace on 13 November 1738, control of Parma and Piacenza was ceded to Austria, which had occupied the duchies but was now forced to recognise Charles as king of Naples and Sicily. Philip also used the War of the Austrian Succession to win back control of Parma. He did not live to see it to its conclusion, however, dying in 1746.

=== Ferdinand VI and Charles III ===
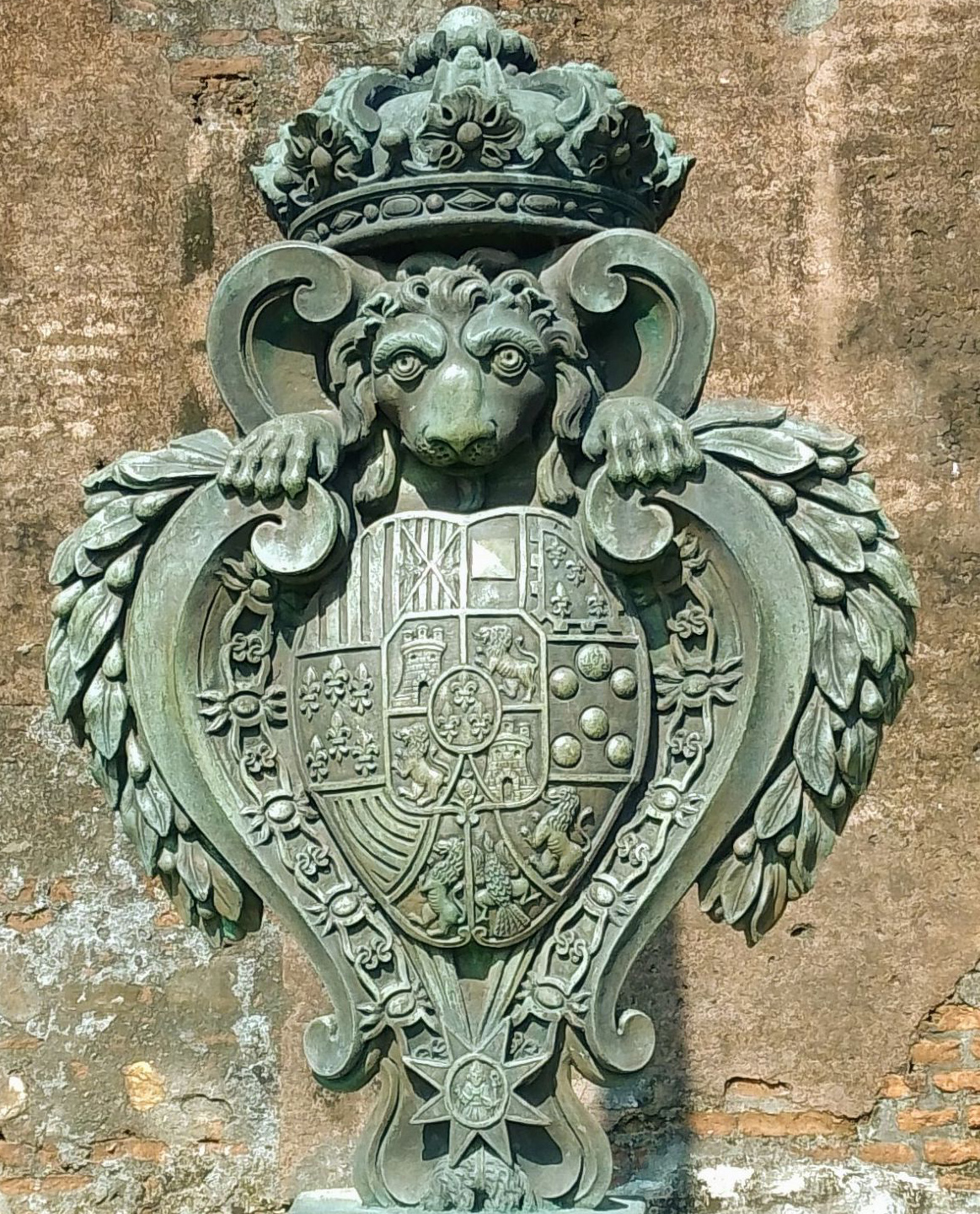
Arms of Ferdinand VI at the Omoa Fortress in Honduras

Ferdinand VI, second son of Philip V and his first wife, succeeded his father. He was a peace-loving monarch who kept Spain out of the Seven Years' War. He died in 1759 in the midst of that conflict and was succeeded by his half-brother Charles III, already reigning as king in Naples and Sicily.

Following Spain's victory over the Austrians at the Battle of Bitonto, it proved inexpedient to reunite Naples and Sicily to Spain, so as a compromise Charles became King of Naples, as Charles IV and VII of Sicily. Following Charles' accession to the Spanish throne in 1759, he was required, by the Treaty of Naples of 3 October 1759, to abdicate Naples and Sicily to his third son, Ferdinand, thus initiating the branch known as the Neapolitan Bourbons.

Charles revived the Family Compact with France on 15 August 1761 and joined in the Seven Years' War against Britain in 1762; the reformist policies he had espoused in Naples were pursued with similar energy in Spain, where he completely overhauled the cumbersome bureaucracy of the state. As a French ally, he opposed Britain during the American Revolution in June 1779, supplying large quantities of weapons and munitions to the rebels and keeping one third of all the British forces in the Americas occupied defending Florida and what is now Alabama, which were ultimately recaptured by Spain. Charles died in 1788.

=== Bourbons of Parma ===
Elisabeth Farnese's ambitions were realized at the conclusion of the War of the Austrian Succession in 1748 when the Duchy of Parma and Piacenza, already occupied by Spanish troops, were ceded by Austria to her second son, Philip, and combined with the former Duchy of Guastalla of the Gonzagas. Elisabeth died in 1766.

== Later Bourbon monarchs outside France ==
Arms of the House of Bourbon-Two Sicilies

Arms of the House of Bourbon-Parma

Upon the fall of the French Empire, Ferdinand I was restored to his throne in Naples, forming the Kingdom of the Two Sicilies in 1816 and founding the House of Bourbon-Two Sicilies. His subjects revolted in 1820 and he was forced to grant a constitution; Austria invaded in March 1821 at his request and revoked the constitution. He was succeeded by his son, Francis I, in 1825 and by his grandson, Ferdinand II, in 1830. A revolution in Sicily erupted in January 1848 and Ferdinand was also forced to grant a constitution. This constitution was revoked in 1849. Ferdinand was succeeded by his son, Francis II, in May 1859.

When Giuseppe Garibaldi captured Naples in 1860, Francis restored the constitution in an attempt to save his sovereignty. He fled to the fortress of Gaeta, which was besieged and captured by the Piedmontese troops in February 1861. His kingdom was incorporated into the Kingdom of Italy on 17 March 1861, after the fall the fortress of Messina (surrendered on 12 March), although the Neapolitan troops in Civitella del Tronto resisted three days longer.

After the fall of Napoleon, Napoleon's wife, Maria Louisa, was made Duchess of Parma. As compensation, Charles Louis, the former king of Etruria, was made the Duke of Lucca. When Maria Louisa died in 1847 he was restored to Parma as Charles II. Lucca was incorporated into Tuscany. He was succeeded by his son, Charles III, and grandson, Robert I, in 1854. The people of Parma voted for a union with the Kingdom of Sardinia in 1860. After Italian unification the next year, the Bourbon dynasty in Italy was no more.

Ferdinand VII was restored to the throne of Spain in March 1814. Like his Italian Bourbon counterpart, his subjects revolted against him in January 1820 and he was forced to grant a constitution. A French army invaded in 1823 and the constitution was revoked. Ferdinand married his fourth wife, Maria Christina, the daughter of Francis I, the Bourbon king of the Two Sicilies, in 1829. Despite his many marriages he did not have a son, so in 1833 he was influenced by his wife to abolish the Salic Law so that their daughter, Isabella, could become queen, depriving his brother, Don Carlos, of the throne.

Isabella II succeeded her father when he died in 1833. She was only three years old and Maria Cristina, her mother, served as regent. Maria knew that she needed the support of the liberals to oppose Don Carlos so she granted a constitution in 1834. Don Carlos found his greatest support in Catalonia and the Basque country because the constitution centralized the provinces thus denying them the autonomy they sought. He was defeated and fled the country in 1839. Isabella was declared of age in 1843 and she married her cousin Francisco de Asís, the son of her father's brother, on 10 October 1846. A military revolution broke out against Isabella in 1868 and she was deposed on 29 September 1868. She abdicated in favor of her son, Alfonso, in 1870, but Spain was proclaimed a republic for a brief time.

When the First Spanish Republic failed, the crown was offered to Isabella's son, who accepted on 1 January 1875 as Alfonso XII. The Carlist pretender, Don Carlos, who returned to Spain, was defeated and resumed his exile in February 1876. Alfonso granted a new constitution in July 1876 that was more liberal than the one granted by his grandmother. His reign was cut short when he died in 1885 at the age of twenty-seven.

Alfonso XIII was born on 17 May 1886, after the death of his father. His mother, Maria Christina, the second wife of Alfonso XII, served as regent. Alfonso XIII was declared of age in 1902, and he married Victoria Eugenie of Battenberg, the granddaughter of the British Queen Victoria, on 31 May 1906. He remained neutral during World War I, but he supported the military coup of Miguel Primo de Rivera on 13 September 1923. A movement towards the establishment of a republic began in 1930, and Alfonso fled the country on 14 April 1931. He never formally abdicated, but he lived the rest of his life in exile and died in 1941.

The Bourbon dynasty seemed finished in Spain as in the rest of the world, but it would be resurrected. The Second Spanish Republic was overthrown in the Spanish Civil War, leading to the dictatorship of Francisco Franco. He named Juan Carlos de Borbón, a grandson of Alfonso XIII, his successor in 1969. When Franco died six years later, Juan Carlos I took the throne to restore the Bourbon dynasty. The new king oversaw the Spanish transition to democracy, and the Spanish Constitution of 1978 recognized the monarchy.

Since 1964, the Bourbon-Parma line has reigned agnatically (although not officially) in Luxembourg through Grand Dukes Jean, his son Henri, and his grandson Guillaume. In June 2011, Luxembourg adopted absolute primogeniture, replacing the old Semi-Salic law that might have guaranteed the survival of Bourbon rule for generations. Although it is not as powerful as it once was and no longer reigns in its native country of France, the House of Bourbon is by no means extinct and has survived to the present-day world, predominantly composed of republics.

The House of Bourbon, in its surviving branches, is believed to be the oldest royal dynasty of Europe (and the oldest documented European family altogether) that is still existing in the direct male line today. The House of Capet's male ancestors, the Robertians, go back to Robert of Hesbaye (d. 807) as their first secured ancestor, and he is believed to be a direct male descendant of Charibert de Haspengau (c. 555–636). Should this be true, only the Imperial House of Japan would outmatch the Bourbon's age, being reliably documented – as a ruling house already – from about 540. The House of Hesse traces its line back to 841, the House of Welf-Este and the House of Wettin were both emerging in the 10th century, and so were some Italian non-ruling houses like the Caetani or the Massimo family, whereas most of the other ruling families of Europe only turned up to the light of history after the year 1000.

== List of Bourbon rulers ==
=== France ===
==== Monarchs of France and Navarre ====
Dates indicate reigns, not lifetimes:

- Henry IV, the Great (1589–1610)
- Louis XIII, the Just (1610–1643)
- Louis XIV, the Sun King (1643–1715)
- Louis XV, the Well-Beloved (1715–1774)
- Louis XVI (1774–1792)

==== Claimants to the throne of France ====
Dates indicate claims, not lifetimes:

- Louis XVI (1792–1793)
- Louis XVII (1793–1795)
- Louis XVIII, the Desired (1795–1814)

==== Monarchs of France ====
Dates indicate reigns, not lifetimes:

- Louis XVIII (1814–1824)
- Charles X (1824–1830)
- Louis Philippe I (House of Bourbon-Orléans) (1830–1848)

==== Legitimist claimants in France ====
Dates indicate claims, not lifetimes:

- Charles X (1830–1836)
- Louis Antoine, Duke of Angoulême (Louis XIX) (1836–1844)
- Henri, Count of Chambord (Henri V) (1844–1883)

==== Legitimist claimants in France (Spanish branch) ====
Dates indicate claims, not lifetimes:

- Prince Juan, Count of Montizón (Jean III) (1883–1887)
- Prince Carlos, Duke of Madrid (Charles XI) (1887–1909)
- Prince Jaime, Duke of Anjou and Madrid (Jacques I) (1909–1931)
- Prince Alfonso Carlos, Duke of Anjou and San Jaime (Charles XII) (1931–1936)
- Alfonso XIII of Spain (Alphonse I) (1936–1941) (did not claim the Throne of France)
- Infante Jaime, Duke of Segovia (Jacques II / Henri VI) (1941–1975)
- Alfonso, Duke of Anjou and Cádiz (Alphonse II) (1975–1989)
- Louis Alphonse, Duke of Anjou (Louis XX) (1989–present)

==== Orléanist and Unionist claimants in France ====
Dates indicate claims, not lifetimes:

- Prince Philippe, Count of Paris (Philippe VII) (1883–1894)
- Prince Philippe, Duke of Orléans (Philippe VIII) (1894–1926)
- Prince Jean, Duke of Guise (Jean III) (1926–1940)
- Prince Henri, Count of Paris (Henry VI) (1940–1999)
- Prince Henri, Count of Paris (Henry VII) (1999–2019)
- Prince Jean, Count of Paris (Jean IV) (2019–present)

=== Kingdom of Spain ===
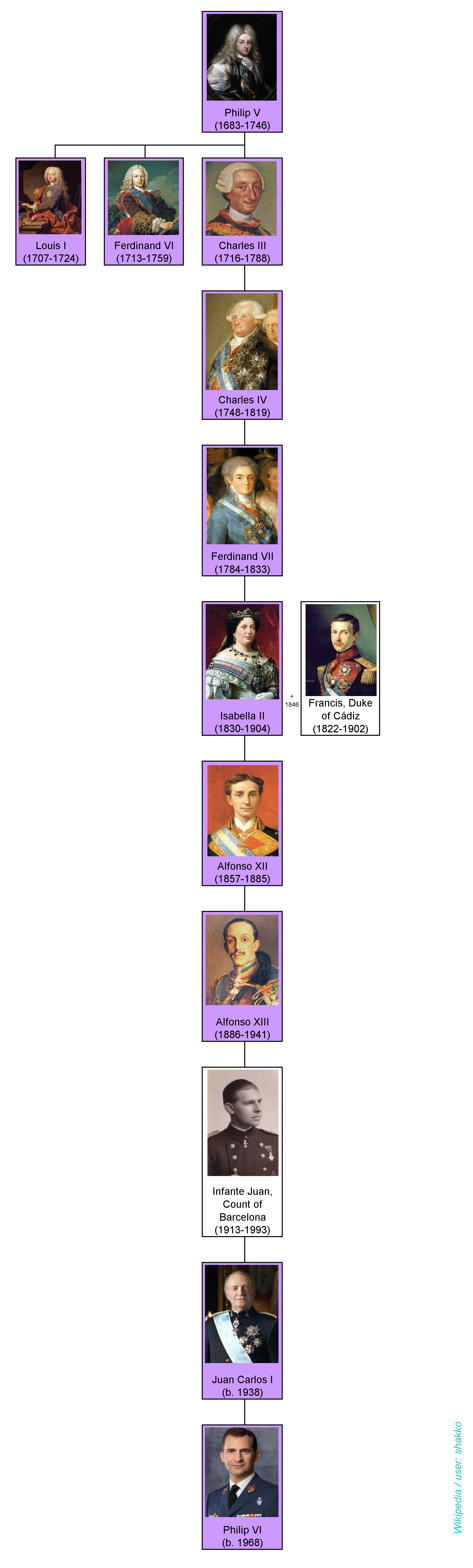
Spanish kings from the House of Bourbon

==== Monarchs of Spain ====
Dates indicate seniority, not lifetimes. Where reign as king or queen of Spain is different, this is noted:

- Philip V (1700–1746) [abdicated 1724, resumed throne on death of son]
- Louis I [King 1724; ruled less than one year]
- Ferdinand VI (1746–1759)
- Charles III (1759–1788)
- Charles IV (1788–1808)
- Ferdinand VII (1808–1833) [King 1808, 1813–1833]
- Isabella II (1833–1870) [Queen 1833–1868]
- Alfonso XII (1870–1885) [King 1874–1885]
- Alfonso XIII (1886–1941) [King 1886–1931]
- Infante Juan, Count of Barcelona (Juan III) (1941–1977) [did not become King]
- Juan Carlos I (1977–2014) [King 1975–2014]
- Felipe VI (2014–present)

==== "Carlist" claimants in Spain ====
Dates indicate claims, not lifetimes:

- Infante Carlos María Isidro of Spain, Count of Molina (Carlos V) (1833–1845)
- Carlos Luis de Borbón, Count of Montemolin (Carlos VI) (1845–1861)
- Prince Juan, Count of Montizón (Juan III) (1861–1868)
- Prince Carlos, Duke of Madrid (Carlos VII) (1868–1909)
- Prince Jaime, Duke of Anjou and Madrid (Jaime III) (1909–1931)
- Prince Alfonso Carlos, Duke of Anjou and San Jaime (Alfonso Carlos I) (1931–1936)
- Prince Xavier of Bourbon-Parma (Xavier I) (1936–1952–1977)
- Carlos Hugo, Duke of Parma (Carlos Hugo I) (1977–1979)
- Prince Sixtus Henry of Bourbon-Parma (Sixto Enrique I) (1979–present)

=== Grand Duchy of Luxembourg ===
==== Grand Dukes of Luxembourg ====
Dates indicate reigns, not lifetimes:

- Jean (1964–2000)
- Henri (2000–2025)
- Guillaume V (2025–present)

=== Other significant Bourbon titles ===
- Dukes of Bourbon, Montpensier, Vendôme, Anjou, Kings of the Two Sicilies, Dukes of Parma, Dukes of Orléans, Princes of Orléans and Braganza
- Princes of Condé
- Princes of Conti

== Surnames used ==
Officially, the King of France had no family name. A prince with the rank of fils de France (Son of France) is surnamed "de France"; all the male-line descendants of each fils de France, however, took his main title (whether an appanage or a courtesy title) as their family or last name. However, when Louis XVI was put on trial and later "guillotined" (executed) by the revolutionaries National Convention in France in 1793, they somewhat contemptuously referred to him in written documents and spoken address as "Citizen Louis Capet" as if a "commoner" (referring back to the Medieval origins of the Bourbon Dynasty's name and referring to Hugh Capet, founder of the Capetian dynasty).

Members of the House of Bourbon-Condé and its cadet branches, which never ascended to the throne, used the surname "de Bourbon" until their extinction in 1830.

The daughters of Gaston, Duke of Orléans, were the first members of the House of Bourbon since the accession of Henry IV to take their surname from the appanage of their father (d'Orléans). Gaston died without a male heir; his titles reverted to the crown. It was given to his nephew, Philippe I, Duke of Orléans, brother of Louis XIV, whose descendants still bear the surname.

When Philippe, grandson of Louis XIV, became King of Spain as Philip V, he gave up his French titles. As a Son of France, his actual surname was "de France". However, since that surname was not heritable for descendants of rank lower than Son of France, and since Philippe had already given up his French titles, his descendants simply took the name of their royal house as their surname ("de Bourbon", rendered in Spanish as "de Borbón").

The children of Philippe's brother, Charles, Duke of Berry (all of whom died in infancy), were given the surname "d'Alençon". He was Duke of Berry only in name, so the surname of his children was taken from his first substantial duchy.

The children of Charles Philippe, Count of Artois, brother of Louis XVI, were surnamed "d'Artois". When Charles succeeded to the throne as Charles X, his son Louis Antoine became a Son of France, with the corresponding change in surname. His grandson, Henri d'Artois, being merely a Grandson of France, would use the surname until his death.

== Capetian related branches ==
- Hugh Capet
  - Robert II of France
    - Henry I of France
      - Philip I of France
        - Louis VI of France
          - Louis VII of France
            - Philip II of France
              - Louis VIII of France
                - Louis IX of France
                  - Philip III of France
                    - Philip IV of France
                    - House of Valois
                    - House of Évreux
                  - House of Bourbon
                - House of Artois
                - House of Anjou
          - House of Dreux
          - House of Courtenay
      - House of Vermandois
    - House of Burgundy

== The three dynasties of Bourbon ==
The first were the lords of Bourbon, who died out by the males in 1171, then by the women in 1216. Their coat of arms are: D'or au lion de gueules, et à l'orle de huit coquilles d'azur Nicolas Louis Achaintre, Genealogical and chronological history of the royal house of Bourbon, vol. 1, éd. Didot, 1825, p. 45.

The second family formed by the marriage of the last descendant of the first family, Mathilde of Bourbon with Guy II of Dampierre, this land passed to the house of Dampierre in 1196. The coat of arms of this family is: "De gueules à deux léopards d'or, avec couronne de baron", but they took the coat of arms of the previous ones. The son of Guy de Dampierre and Mahaut de Bourbon, Archambaud VIII, took the name and arms of his mother, "de Bourbon", the House of Bourbon-Dampierre. By the marriage of, Agnes of Dampierre (died around 1287), with John of Burgundy, this important lordship passed to their daughter Béatrice de Bourgogne (1257–1310), lady of Bourbon, then to her husband Robert, Count of Clermont (1256–1317), and penultimate child of Saint Louis, thus possessing the land of Bourbon by "the right of the woman (de iure uxoris).

The third house of Bourbon acceded to the throne of Navarre in 1555, then to the throne of France in 1589 by Henri IV. His coat of arms are: "D'azur, fleurs-de-lys d'or sans nombre, l'écu brisé d'un bâton ou cotice de gueules, brochant sur le tout, avec couronne de fils de France. The name House of Bourbon was then used to describe the entire House of France, officially since 29 June 1768, date of death of Hélène de Courtenay (1689–1768), with which was extinguished the Capetian House of Courtenay, extinction which made the House of France the only branch dynasty resulting from the dukes of Bourbon.

== First House of Bourbon ==
The Lords of Bourbon, 9th century until 1196.

- Knight Aymar or Adhemar, († v. 953)
  - Aymon I^{er}, Lord of Bourbon († v. 959)
    - Archambaud I the Frank, Lord of Bourbon († v. 990)
      - Archambaud II the Old Man, Lord of Bourbon († v. 1031)
        - Archambaud III the Younger, Lord of Bourbon († 1064)
          - Archambaud IV the Strong, Lord of Bourbon († 1078)
            - Archambaud V the Pious, Lord of Bourbon († 1096)
              - Archambaud VI the Pupil, Lord of Bourbon († 1116)
                - Aymon II Cow-Coward, Lord of Bourbon († 1120)
                  - Archambaud VII, Lord of Bourbon († 1171)
                    - [Bourbon Archambaud] († 1169)
                      - Mathilde I^{re}, Lady of Bourbon († 1218) x Guy II of Dampierre, Marshal of Champagne († 1216)
                        - | → see below

== Second House of Bourbon (Bourbon-Dampierre) ==
Prince of Bourbon since 1196:

- Mathilde (Mahaut), Lady of Bourbon († 1218), granddaughter of Archambault VII, Lord of Bourbon, married Guy II of Dampierre, Marshall of Champagne († 1216)
  - Archambaud VIII the Great, Lord of Bourbon († 1242)
    - Archambaud IX the Young, Lord of Bourbon († 1249), married Yolande of Châtillon, Countess of Nevers, Auxerre and Tonnerre
      - Mahaut II, Lady of Bourbon († 1262) married Eudes of Burgundy († 1266)
        - Capetian House of Burgundy
      - Agnès, Countess of Nevers, Auxerre and Tonnerre († 1288) married John of Burgundy, Lord of Charolais († 1268)
        - Beatrix of Burgundy married Robert, Count of Clermont

== Third and current House of Bourbon ==
Princes and Dukes of Bourbon from 1327 to 1830:

|→ Beatrice of Burgundy, Lady of Bourbon

  x Robert de France (1256–1317), Count of Clermont (son of Louis IX of France (1215–1270) and of Marguerite de Provence)
   ├─>Louis (1280–1342), Duke of Bourbon
   │  X Marie d'Avesnes (1280–1354)
   │  │
   │  ├─>Pierre (1311–1356), Duke of Bourbon
   │  │  X Isabella of Valois (1313–1383)
   │  │  │
   │  │  ├─>Jeanne (1338–1378)
   │  │  │  x Charles V of France
   │  │  │
   │  │  ├─>Louis II (1337–1410), Duke of Bourbon
   │  │  │  X Anne of Auvergne (1358–1417), Comtess de Forez
   │  │  │  │
   │  │  │  ├─>Jean (1381–1434), Duke of Bourbon
   │  │  │  │  X Marie, Duchess of Auvergne (1367–1434)
   │  │  │  │  │
   │  │  │  │  ├─>Charles (1401–1456), Duke de Bourbon
   │  │  │  │  │  X Agnes of Burgundy, Duchess of Bourbon (1407–1476)
   │  │  │  │  │  │
   │  │  │  │  │  ├─>Jean II (1426–1488), Duke de Bourbon 
   │  │  │  │  │  │  X 1) Jeanne de France (1430–1482)
   │  │  │  │  │  │  X 2) Catherine d'Armagnac (+1487)
   │  │  │  │  │  │  X 3) Jeanne de Bourbon-Vendôme (1465–1512)
   │  │  │  │  │  │  │
   │  │  │  │  │  │  ├2>Jean (1487–1487), Comte de Clermont
   │  │  │  │  │  │  │
   │  │  │  │  │  │  └3>Louis (1488–1488), Comte de Clermont
   │  │  │  │  │  │  │
   │  │  │  │  │  │  ├i>Mathieu (+1505), Prince de Bothéon en Forez (Bouthéon)
   │  │  │  │  │  │  │
   │  │  │  │  │  │  ├i>Hector, (+1502), Archbishop of Toulouse
   │  │  │  │  │  │  │
   │  │  │  │  │  │  ├i>Pierre
   │  │  │  │  │  │  │
   │  │  │  │  │  │  ├i>Marie (+1482) 
   │  │  │  │  │  │  │  X Jacques de Sainte-Colombe
   │  │  │  │  │  │  │
   │  │  │  │  │  │  ├i>Marguerite (1445–1482)
   │  │  │  │  │  │  │  X Jean de Ferrieres (+1497)
   │  │  │  │  │  │  │
Maison illégitime de Bourbon-Lavedan 
   │  │  │  │  │  │  └i>Charles (+1502), vicomte de Lavedan 
   │  │  │  │  │  │     X Louise du Lion, vicomtesse de Lavedan
   │  │  │  │  │  │     │
   │  │  │  │  │  │     └─>branche illégitime des Bourbon Lavedan
   │  │  │  │  │  │
   │  │  │  │  │  ├─>Marie (1428–1448) 
   │  │  │  │  │  │  X Jean II, Duke of Lorraine (1425–1470)
   │  │  │  │  │  │
   │  │  │  │  │  ├─>Philippe, prince de Beaujeu (1430–1440)
   │  │  │  │  │  │
   │  │  │  │  │  ├─>Charles II (1434–1488), cardinal, archevêque de Lyon, duc de Bourbon
   │  │  │  │  │  │  │
   │  │  │  │  │  │  └i>Isabelle-Paris (+1497)
   │  │  │  │  │  │     X Gilbert de Chantelot
   │  │  │  │  │  │
   │  │  │  │  │  ├─>Isabelle (1436–1465)
   │  │  │  │  │  │  X Charles the Bold (+1477)
   │  │  │  │  │  │
   │  │  │  │  │  ├─>Louis (1438–1482), évêque de Liege
   │  │  │  │  │  │  X inconnue
   │  │  │  │  │  │  │
Maison illégitime de Bourbon-Busset 
   │  │  │  │  │  │  ├─>i>Pierre de Bourbon (1464–1529), baron de Busset 
   │  │  │  │  │  │  │  X Marguerite de Tourzel, dame de Busset (+1531) 
   │  │  │  │  │  │  │  │
   │  │  │  │  │  │  │  └─>branche illégitime des Bourbon-Busset
   │  │  │  │  │  │  │
   │  │  │  │  │  │  ├─>Louis (1465–1500)
   │  │  │  │  │  │  │
   │  │  │  │  │  │  └─>Jacques (1466–1537)
   │  │  │  │  │  │
   │  │  │  │  │  ├─>Pierre II de Beaujeu (1438–1503), Duke of Bourbon 
   │  │  │  │  │  │  x Anne of France (1462–1522)
   │  │  │  │  │  │  │
   │  │  │  │  │  │  ├─>Charles, Comte de Clermont (1476–1498)
   │  │  │  │  │  │  │
   │  │  │  │  │  │  └─>Suzanne (1491–1521)
   │  │  │  │  │  │     x Charles III, Duke of Bourbon (1490–1527)
   │  │  │  │  │  │
   │  │  │  │  │  ├─>Catherine (1440–1469)
   │  │  │  │  │  │  X Adolphe de Gueldres (1438–1477)
   │  │  │  │  │  │
   │  │  │  │  │  ├─>Jeanne (1442–1493)
   │  │  │  │  │  │  X Jean II de Chalon, Prince d'Orange (+1502)
   │  │  │  │  │  │
   │  │  │  │  │  ├─>Marguerite (1444–1483)
   │  │  │  │  │  │  X Philip II, Duke of Savoy (1438–1497)
   │  │  │  │  │  │
   │  │  │  │  │  └─>Jacques (1445–1468) 
   │  │  │  │  │  │
Maison illégitime de Bourbon-Roussillon
   │  │  │  │  │  ├i>Louis (+1487), comte de Roussillon-en-Dauphine et de Ligny 
   │  │  │  │  │  │  X Jeanne de France (+1519) 
   │  │  │  │  │  │  │
   │  │  │  │  │  │  ├─>Charles (+1510), comte de Roussillon et de Ligny
   │  │  │  │  │  │  │  X Anne de La Tour (+1530) 
   │  │  │  │  │  │  │
   │  │  │  │  │  │  ├─>Suzanne (1466–1531), comtesse de Roussillon et de Ligny
   │  │  │  │  │  │  │  X Jean de Chabannes, comte de Dammartin
   │  │  │  │  │  │  │  X 2) Charles, seigneur de Boulainvilliers (+1529)
   │  │  │  │  │  │  │
   │  │  │  │  │  │  └─>Anne
   │  │  │  │  │  │  │  X Jean II, baron d'Arpajon
   │  │  │  │  │  │  │
   │  │  │  │  │  │  └i>Jean, abbé de Senilly 
   │  │  │  │  │  │
   │  │  │  │  │  ├i>Renaud (+1483), archevêque de Narbonne 1483
   │  │  │  │  │  │  │
   │  │  │  │  │  │  ├i>Charles (1461–1504), évêque de Clermont
   │  │  │  │  │  │  │
   │  │  │  │  │  │  └i>Suzanne
   │  │  │  │  │  │     X Louis de Coustaves, seigneur de Chazelles
   │  │  │  │  │  │
   │  │  │  │  │  ├i>Pierre (+1490), prêtre, seigneur du Bois-d'Yoin-en-Lyonnais
   │  │  │  │  │  │  │
   │  │  │  │  │  │  ├i>Antoinette
   │  │  │  │  │  │  │  X Pierre Dyenne
   │  │  │  │  │  │  │
   │  │  │  │  │  │  └i>Catherine
   │  │  │  │  │  │     X Pierre Holiflant
   │  │  │  │  │  │
   │  │  │  │  │  ├i>Jeanne
   │  │  │  │  │  │  X Jean du Fay, seigneur de Bray-en-Touraine
   │  │  │  │  │  │
   │  │  │  │  │  ├i>Charlotte
   │  │  │  │  │  │  X Odilles de Senay
   │  │  │  │  │  │
   │  │  │  │  │  ├i>Sidoine
   │  │  │  │  │  │  X Rene, prince de Bus
   │  │  │  │  │  │
   │  │  │  │  │  └i>Catherine, abbesse de Sainte-Claire-d'Aigueperse
   │  │  │  │  │
   │  │  │  │  ├─>Louis, comte de Forez (1403–1412)
   │  │  │  │  │
Maison de Bourbon-Montpensier (comtes)
   │  │  │  │  └─>Louis I, Count of Montpensier
   │  │  │  │  │  X 1) Jeanne, dauphine d'Auvergne (+1436)
   │  │  │  │  │  X 2) Gabrielle de La Tour (+1486)
   │  │  │  │  │  │
   │  │  │  │  │  ├2>Gilbert (1443–1496), comte de Montpensier
   │  │  │  │  │  │  X Claire Gonzaga (1464–1503)
   │  │  │  │  │  │  │
   │  │  │  │  │  │  ├─>Louise (1482–1561), duchesse de Montpensier, dauphine d'Auvergne
   │  │  │  │  │  │  │  X 1) Andre III de Chauvigny (+1503)
   │  │  │  │  │  │  │  X 2) Louis de Bourbon, prince of la Roche-sur-Yon (1473–1520)
   │  │  │  │  │  │  │
   │  │  │  │  │  │  ├─>Louis II (1483–1501), comte de Montpensier
   │  │  │  │  │  │  │
   │  │  │  │  │  │  ├─>Charles III, Duke of Bourbon (1490–1527), duc de Bourbon (1490–1527), le "connétable de Bourbon"
   │  │  │  │  │  │  │  X Suzanne, Duchess of Bourbon (1491–1521)
   │  │  │  │  │  │  │  │
   │  │  │  │  │  │  │  ├─>François, comte de Clermont (1517–1518)
   │  │  │  │  │  │  │  │
   │  │  │  │  │  │  │  └─>deux jumeaux (1518–1518)
   │  │  │  │  │  │  │  │
   │  │  │  │  │  │  │  └i>Catherine
   │  │  │  │  │  │  │     X Bertrand Salmart, seigneur of Ressis
   │  │  │  │  │  │  │
   │  │  │  │  │  │  ├─>François (1492–1515), duc de Chatellerault
   │  │  │  │  │  │  │
   │  │  │  │  │  │  ├─>Renée, dame de Mercœur (1494–1539)
   │  │  │  │  │  │  │  X Antoine, Duke of Lorraine (1489–1544)
   │  │  │  │  │  │  │
   │  │  │  │  │  │  └─>Anne (1495–1510)
   │  │  │  │  │  │
   │  │  │  │  │  ├2>Jean (1445–1485)
   │  │  │  │  │  │
   │  │  │  │  │  ├2>Gabrielle (1447–1516)
   │  │  │  │  │  │  X Louis de la Tremoille, prince de Talmond (+1525)
   │  │  │  │  │  │
   │  │  │  │  │  └2>Charlotte (1449–1478)
   │  │  │  │  │     X Wolfart van Borsselen, comte de Grandpré (+1487)
   │  │  │  │  │
   │  │  │  │  ├i>Jean, comte de Velay, évêque de Puy-Rembert-en-Forez 1485
   │  │  │  │  │
   │  │  │  │  ├i>Alexandre, prêtre
   │  │  │  │  │
   │  │  │  │  ├i>Guy (+1442)
   │  │  │  │  │
   │  │  │  │  ├i>Marguerite
   │  │  │  │  │  X Rodrigo de Villandrando, comte de Ribadeo
   │  │  │  │  │
   │  │  │  │  └i>Edmée
   │  │  │  │
   │  │  │  ├─>Louis, prince de Beaujolais (1388–1404)
   │  │  │  │
   │  │  │  ├─>Catherine (1378-jeune)
   │  │  │  │
   │  │  │  └─>Isabelle (1384-ap.1451)
   │  │  │  │
   │  │  │  ├i>Hector, prince de Dampierre-en-Champagne (1391–1414)
   │  │  │  │
   │  │  │  ├i>Perceval (1402–1415)
   │  │  │  │
   │  │  │  ├i>Pierre, chevalier
   │  │  │  │
   │  │  │  ├i>Jacques, moine
   │  │  │  │
   │  │  │  └i>Jean, prince de Tanry
   │  │  │
   │  │  ├─>Jeanne (1339 – Paris 1378)
   │  │  │  X Charles V of France (1337–1380)
   │  │  │
   │  │  ├─>Blanche (1339–1361) 
   │  │  │  X Peter of Castile
   │  │  │
   │  │  ├─>Bonne (1341–1402)
   │  │  │  X Amadeus VIII, Duke of Savoy (+1383)
   │  │  │
   │  │  ├─>Catherine (1342–1427)
   │  │  │  X John VI, Count of Harcourt (+1388)
   │  │  │
   │  │  ├─>Marguerite ((1344)
   │  │  │  X Arnaud Amanieu d'Albret (1338–1401)
   │  │  │
   │  │  ├─>Isabelle (1345–)
   │  │  │
   │  │  └─>Marie (1347–1401), prieure de Poissy
   │  │
   │  ├─>Jeanne (1312–1402) 
   │  │  X Guigues VII de Forez (1299–1357)
   │  │
   │  ├─>Marguerite (1313–1362)
   │  │  X 1)Jean II de Sully (+1343)
   │  │  X 2)Hutin de Vermeilles
   │  │
   │  ├─>Marie (1315–1387)
   │  │  X 1) Guy de Lusignan (1315–1343)
   │  │  X 2) Robert de Tarente (+1364)
   │  │
   │  ├─>Philippe (1316–c.1233)
   │  │
   │  ├─>Jacques (1318–1318)
   │  │
Maison de Bourbon-La Marche
   │  ├─>Jacques (1319–1362), Count of la Marche and Count of Ponthieu
   │  │  X Jeanne de Chatillon, dame de Condé et Carency(1320–1371)
   │  │  │
   │  │  ├─>Isabelle (1340–1371) 
   │  │  │  X 1) Louis II de Brienne, vicomte de Beaumont (+1364)
   │  │  │  X Bouchard VII, Count of Vendôme (+1371)
   │  │  │
   │  │  ├─>Pierre de la Marche (1342–1362)
   │  │  │
   │  │  ├─>Jean de Bourbon (1344–1393), comte de Vendôme et de la Marche 
   │  │  │  x Catherine of Vendôme (+1412)
   │  │  │  │
   │  │  │  ├─>Jacques II (1370–1438), comte de La Marche
   │  │  │  │  x 1) Béatrice d'Évreux
   │  │  │  │  x 2) Joanna II of Naples
   │  │  │  │  │
   │  │  │  │  ├1>Isabelle (1408–c. 1445), nonne à Besançon
   │  │  │  │  │
   │  │  │  │  ├1>Marie (1410–c. 1445), nonne à Amiens
   │  │  │  │  │
   │  │  │  │  └1>Eléonore de Bourbon (1412–c.1464)
   │  │  │  │  │  x Bernard d'Armagnac (+1462)
   │  │  │  │  │
   │  │  │  │  └i>Claude d'Aix, moine à Dole
   │  │  │  │
   │  │  │  ├─>Anne (+1408)
   │  │  │  │  X 1) Jean II de Berry (+1401), comte de Montpensier
   │  │  │  │  X 2) Louis VII (+1447), duc de Bavière-Ingolstadt
   │  │  │  │
   │  │  │  ├─>Isabelle (1373–), nonne à Poissy
   │  │  │  │
Maison de Bourbon-Vendôme
   │  │  │  ├─>Louis de Bourbon (1376–1446), comte de Vendôme
   │  │  │  │  X 1) Blanche de Roucy (+1421)
   │  │  │  │  X 2) Jeanne de Laval (1406–1468) 
   │  │  │  │  │
   │  │  │  │  ├2>Catherine (1425–jeune)
   │  │  │  │  │
   │  │  │  │  ├2>Gabrielle (1426–jeune)
   │  │  │  │  │
   │  │  │  │  └2>Jean VIII de Bourbon (1428–1478), comte de Vendôme
   │  │  │  │  │  X Isabelle de Beauvau
   │  │  │  │  │  │
   │  │  │  │  │  ├─>Jeanne, dame de Rochefort (1460–1487)
   │  │  │  │  │  │  X Louis de Joyeuse, comte de Grandpre (+1498)
   │  │  │  │  │  │
   │  │  │  │  │  ├─>Catherine (1462–)
   │  │  │  │  │  │  X Gilbert de Chabannes, baron de Rochefort
   │  │  │  │  │  │
   │  │  │  │  │  ├─>Jeanne (1465–1511)
   │  │  │  │  │  │  X 1) Jean II de Bourbon (+1488)
   │  │  │  │  │  │  X 2) Jean de la Tour, comte d'Auvergne et de Boulogne (1467–1501)
   │  │  │  │  │  │  X 3) François de la Pause, baron de la Garde
   │  │  │  │  │  │
   │  │  │  │  │  ├─>Renée (1468–1534), abbess of Fontevraud
   │  │  │  │  │  │
   │  │  │  │  │  ├─>François de Bourbon (1470–1495), comte de Vendôme
   │  │  │  │  │  │  X Marie of Luxembourg (+1546)
   │  │  │  │  │  │  │
   │  │  │  │  │  │  ├─>Charles IV, Duke of Bourbon (1489–1537), duc de Vendôme
   │  │  │  │  │  │  │  x Françoise d'Alençon (1491–1550)
   │  │  │  │  │  │  │  │
   │  │  │  │  │  │  │  ├─>Louis (1514–1516), comte de Marle
   │  │  │  │  │  │  │  │
   │  │  │  │  │  │  │  ├─>Marie (1515–1538)
   │  │  │  │  │  │  │  │
   │  │  │  │  │  │  │  ├─>Antoine of Navarre (1518–1562), duc de Vendôme
   │  │  │  │  │  │  │  │  x Jeanne III d'Albret (1529–1572), reine de Navarre
   │  │  │  │  │  │  │  │  │
   │  │  │  │  │  │  │  │  ├─>Henri (1551–1553), duc de Beaumont
   │  │  │  │  │  │  │  │  │
    Kings of France
   │  │  │  │  │  │  │  │  ├─>Henri IV of France (1553–1610)/Henri III de Navarre
   │  │  │  │  │  │  │  │  │  │
   │  │  │  │  │  │  │  │  │  └─>Bourbon dynasty
   │  │  │  │  │  │  │  │  │
   │  │  │  │  │  │  │  │  ├─>Louis, comte de Marle (1555–1557)
   │  │  │  │  │  │  │  │  │
   │  │  │  │  │  │  │  │  ├─>Madeleine (1556–1556)
   │  │  │  │  │  │  │  │  │
   │  │  │  │  │  │  │  │  └─>Catherine (1559–1604)
   │  │  │  │  │  │  │  │  │  X Henry II de Lorraine (1563–1624)
   │  │  │  │  │  │  │  │  │
   │  │  │  │  │  │  │  │  ├i>Charles (1554–1610), Archbishop of Rouen
   │  │  │  │  │  │  │  │  │
   │  │  │  │  │  │  │  │  └i>Jacquinne d'Artigulouve
   │  │  │  │  │  │  │  │     X N de Navailles
   │  │  │  │  │  │  │  │
   │  │  │  │  │  │  │  ├─>Marguerite (1516–1589)
   │  │  │  │  │  │  │  │  X Francois I de Clèves, duc de Nevers (+1561)
   │  │  │  │  │  │  │  │
   │  │  │  │  │  │  │  ├─>Madeleine (1521–1561), abbesse
   │  │  │  │  │  │  │  │
   │  │  │  │  │  │  │  ├─>François, comte d'Enghien (1519–1546)
   │  │  │  │  │  │  │  │
   │  │  │  │  │  │  │  ├─>Louis (1522–1525)
   │  │  │  │  │  │  │  │
   │  │  │  │  │  │  │  ├─>Charles (1523–1590), cardinal, Archbishop of Rouen
   │  │  │  │  │  │  │  │  │
   │  │  │  │  │  │  │  │  └i>Poullain
   │  │  │  │  │  │  │  │
   │  │  │  │  │  │  │  ├─>Catherine, abbesse (1525–1594)
   │  │  │  │  │  │  │  │
   │  │  │  │  │  │  │  ├─>Jean (1528–1557), comte de Soissons et d'Enghien, duc d'Estouteville
   │  │  │  │  │  │  │  │  X Marie (1539–1601), duchesse d'Estouteville
   │  │  │  │  │  │  │  │  │
   │  │  │  │  │  │  │  │  └i>N de Valency (+1562)
   │  │  │  │  │  │  │  │
   │  │  │  │  │  │  │  ├─>Renée, abbesse de Chelles (1527–1583)
   │  │  │  │  │  │  │  │
Maison de Bourbon-Condé
   │  │  │  │  │  │  │  ├─>Louis (1530–1569), prince de Condé
   │  │  │  │  │  │  │  │  │
   │  │  │  │  │  │  │  │  └─>House of Condé
   │  │  │  │  │  │  │  │
   │  │  │  │  │  │  │  └─>Eléonore, abbess of Fontevraud (1532–1611)
   │  │  │  │  │  │  │  │
   │  │  │  │  │  │  │  └i>Nicolas Charles 
   │  │  │  │  │  │  │     X Jeanne de Bordeix et de Ramers
   │  │  │  │  │  │  │     │
   │  │  │  │  │  │  │     ├─>Jacques
   │  │  │  │  │  │  │     │
   │  │  │  │  │  │  │     ├─>Michel Charles
   │  │  │  │  │  │  │     │
   │  │  │  │  │  │  │     ├─>Nicolas
   │  │  │  │  │  │  │     │
   │  │  │  │  │  │  │     ├─>Christophe
   │  │  │  │  │  │  │     │
   │  │  │  │  │  │  │     ├─>Marguerite
   │  │  │  │  │  │  │     │
   │  │  │  │  │  │  │     └─>Jeanne
   │  │  │  │  │  │  │
   │  │  │  │  │  │  ├─>Jacques (1490–1491)
   │  │  │  │  │  │  │
   │  │  │  │  │  │  ├─>François I (1491–1545), comte de Saint-Pol, duc d'Estouteville
   │  │  │  │  │  │  │  X Adrienne, duchesse d'Estouteville (1512–1560)
   │  │  │  │  │  │  │  │
   │  │  │  │  │  │  │  ├─>François II (1536–1546), duc d'Estouteville
   │  │  │  │  │  │  │  │
   │  │  │  │  │  │  │  └─>Marie, duchesse d'Estouteville, (1539–1601)
   │  │  │  │  │  │  │     X 1) Jean de Bourbon, comte de Soissons
   │  │  │  │  │  │  │     X 2) François de Clèves, duc de Nevers (+1562)
   │  │  │  │  │  │  │     X 3) Léonor, duc de Longueville (1540–1573)
   │  │  │  │  │  │  │
   │  │  │  │  │  │  ├─>Louis (1493–1557), cardinal, archevêque de Sens
   │  │  │  │  │  │  │
   │  │  │  │  │  │  ├─>Antoinette (1493–1583)
   │  │  │  │  │  │  │  X Claude, Duke of Guise (1496–1550)
   │  │  │  │  │  │  │
   │  │  │  │  │  │  └─>Louise (1495–1575), abbess of Fontevraud
   │  │  │  │  │  │  │
   │  │  │  │  │  │  └i>Jacques (1495–)
   │  │  │  │  │  │
Maison de Bourbon-Montpensier (ducs)
   │  │  │  │  │  ├─>Louis (1473–1520), prince of La Roche-sur-Yon
   │  │  │  │  │  │  X Louise de Montpensier (1482–1561)
   │  │  │  │  │  │  │
   │  │  │  │  │  │  ├─>Suzanne (1508–1570)
   │  │  │  │  │  │  │  Claude de Rieux, comte d'Harcourt et d'Aumale (+1532)
   │  │  │  │  │  │  │
   │  │  │  │  │  │  ├─>Louis (1513–1582), Duke of Montpensier
   │  │  │  │  │  │  │  X 1) Jacqueline de Longwy (+1561)
   │  │  │  │  │  │  │  X 2) Catherine de Lorraine (1552–1596)
   │  │  │  │  │  │  │  │
   │  │  │  │  │  │  │  ├1>Françoise (1539–1587)
   │  │  │  │  │  │  │  │  X Henri-Robert de La Marck, duke of Bouillon, prince of Sedan (+1574)
   │  │  │  │  │  │  │  │
   │  │  │  │  │  │  │  ├1>Anne (1540–1572)
   │  │  │  │  │  │  │  │  X François de Clèves, duc de Nevers (+1562)
   │  │  │  │  │  │  │  │
   │  │  │  │  │  │  │  ├─>Jeanne (1541–1620), abbesse de Jouarre
   │  │  │  │  │  │  │  │
   │  │  │  │  │  │  │  ├1>François (1542–1592), duc de Montpensier
   │  │  │  │  │  │  │  │  X Renée (1550–1590), marquise de Mezieres
   │  │  │  │  │  │  │  │  │
   │  │  │  │  │  │  │  │  └─>Henri (1573–1608), duc de Montpensier
   │  │  │  │  │  │  │  │     X Henriette-Catherine (1585–1656), duchesse de Joyeuse
   │  │  │  │  │  │  │  │     │
   │  │  │  │  │  │  │  │     └─>Marie (1605–1627), Duchess of Montpensier
   │  │  │  │  │  │  │  │        x Gaston de France
   │  │  │  │  │  │  │  │
   │  │  │  │  │  │  │  ├─>Charlotte (1547–1582)
   │  │  │  │  │  │  │  │  X Guillaume de Orange-Nassau (+1584)
   │  │  │  │  │  │  │  │
   │  │  │  │  │  │  │  └─>Louise (1548–1586), abbesse de Faremoutier
   │  │  │  │  │  │  │
   │  │  │  │  │  │  └─>Charles (1515–1565), prince de la Roche sur Yon
   │  │  │  │  │  │  │  X Philippe de Montespedon, dame de Beaupreau (+1578)
   │  │  │  │  │  │  │  │
   │  │  │  │  │  │  │  ├─>Henri, marquis de Beaupreau (154?–1560)
   │  │  │  │  │  │  │  │
   │  │  │  │  │  │  │  └─>Jeanne (1547–1548)
   │  │  │  │  │  │  │
   │  │  │  │  │  │  └i>Louis dit Helvis, évêque de Langres (+1565)
   │  │  │  │  │  │
   │  │  │  │  │  ├─>Charlotte (1474–1520)
   │  │  │  │  │  │  X Engelbert de Clèves, comte de Nevers (+1506)
   │  │  │  │  │  │
   │  │  │  │  │  └─>Isabelle (1475–1531), abbesse
   │  │  │  │  │  │
   │  │  │  │  │  ├i>Jacques de Vendôme (1455–1524), baron de Ligny
   │  │  │  │  │  │  X Jeanne, dame de Rubempré 
   │  │  │  │  │  │  │
   │  │  │  │  │  │  ├─>Claude de Bourbon-Vendôme (1514–1595)
   │  │  │  │  │  │  │  X Antoinette de Bours, vicomtesse de Lambercourt (+1585)
   │  │  │  │  │  │  │  │
   │  │  │  │  │  │  │  ├─>Antoine (+1594), vicomte de Lambercourt
   │  │  │  │  │  │  │  │
   │  │  │  │  │  │  │  ├─>Claude (+1620), vicomtesse de Lambercourt
   │  │  │  │  │  │  │  │  X Jean, seigneur de Rambures
   │  │  │  │  │  │  │  │
   │  │  │  │  │  │  │  └─>Anne
   │  │  │  │  │  │  │  │  X Claude de Crequi, seigneur d'Hemond
   │  │  │  │  │  │  │  │
   │  │  │  │  │  │  │  └i>Jacques (+1632), seigneur de Ligny et de Courcelles
   │  │  │  │  │  │  │     X 1) Marie de Bommy
   │  │  │  │  │  │  │     X 2) Louise de Gouy
   │  │  │  │  │  │  │     │
   │  │  │  │  │  │  │     ├─>François Claude (+1658)
   │  │  │  │  │  │  │     │  X Louise de Belleval
   │  │  │  │  │  │  │     │
   │  │  │  │  │  │  │     ├─>François, seigneur de Bretencourt
   │  │  │  │  │  │  │     │  X Jacqueline Tillette d'Achery
   │  │  │  │  │  │  │     │  │
   │  │  │  │  │  │  │     │  ├─>une fille mariée à un seigneur des Lyons
   │  │  │  │  │  │  │     │  │
   │  │  │  │  │  │  │     │  └─>une fille mariée à un Fortel des Essarts
   │  │  │  │  │  │  │     │
   │  │  │  │  │  │  │     ├─>Charles, seigneur de Brétencourt
   │  │  │  │  │  │  │     │
   │  │  │  │  │  │  │     ├─>Marguerite
   │  │  │  │  │  │  │     │  X 1) Jacques de Monchy, seigneur d'Amerval (+1640)
   │  │  │  │  │  │  │     │  X 2) Antoine de Postel, seigneur de la Grange
   │  │  │  │  │  │  │     │
   │  │  │  │  │  │  │     ├─>Marie Gabrielle (+1629)
   │  │  │  │  │  │  │     │
   │  │  │  │  │  │  │     └─>Antoinette
   │  │  │  │  │  │  │        X Alexandre de Touzin
   │  │  │  │  │  │  │
   │  │  │  │  │  │  ├─>André, seigneur de Rubempré
   │  │  │  │  │  │  │  X 1) Anne de Busserade
   │  │  │  │  │  │  │  X 2) Anne de Roncherolles
   │  │  │  │  │  │  │  │
   │  │  │  │  │  │  │  ├─>Jean (+jeune)
   │  │  │  │  │  │  │  │
   │  │  │  │  │  │  │  ├─>Charles, seigneur de Rubempré (+1595)
   │  │  │  │  │  │  │  │
   │  │  │  │  │  │  │  ├─>Louis, seigneur de Rubempré (1574–1598)
   │  │  │  │  │  │  │  │
   │  │  │  │  │  │  │  ├─>Marguerite, dame de Rubempré
   │  │  │  │  │  │  │  │  X Jean de Monchy, seigneur de Montcavrel
   │  │  │  │  │  │  │  │
   │  │  │  │  │  │  │  ├─>Madeleine
   │  │  │  │  │  │  │  │  X Jean, seigneur de Gonnelieu
   │  │  │  │  │  │  │  │
   │  │  │  │  │  │  │  ├─>Jeanne Marie, abbesse
   │  │  │  │  │  │  │  │
   │  │  │  │  │  │  │  └─>Marguerite, nonne
   │  │  │  │  │  │  │
   │  │  │  │  │  │  ├─>Jean (+1571), abbé de Cuisey
   │  │  │  │  │  │  │
   │  │  │  │  │  │  ├─>Jacques, moine
   │  │  │  │  │  │  │
   │  │  │  │  │  │  ├─>Catherine (+1530)
   │  │  │  │  │  │  │  X Jean d'Estrées, seigneur de Cœuvres
   │  │  │  │  │  │  │
   │  │  │  │  │  │  ├─>Jeanne, abbesse
   │  │  │  │  │  │  │
   │  │  │  │  │  │  └─>Madeleine (+ 1588), abbesse
   │  │  │  │  │  │
   │  │  │  │  │  └i>Louis de Vendôme (+1510), évêque d'Avranches
   │  │  │  │  │
   │  │  │  │  └i>Jean de Vendôme, seigneur de Preaux (1420–1496)
   │  │  │  │     X 1) Jeanne d'Illiers
   │  │  │  │     X 2) Gillette Perdrielle
   │  │  │  │     │
   │  │  │  │     ├─>Jean, prêtre
   │  │  │  │     │
   │  │  │  │     ├─>François (+1540), prêtre
   │  │  │  │     │
   │  │  │  │     ├─>Jacques
   │  │  │  │     │
   │  │  │  │     ├─>Mathurine
   │  │  │  │     │  X Pierre de Montigny, seigneur de la Boisse
   │  │  │  │     │
   │  │  │  │     ├─>Louise
   │  │  │  │     │  X Jean, seigneur des Loges
   │  │  │  │     │
   │  │  │  │     └─>Marie
   │  │  │  │        X 1) seigneur de La Velette en Limousin
   │  │  │  │        X 2) Jacques de Gaudebert, seigneur des Forges
   │  │  │  │
Maison de Bourbon-Carency
   │  │  │  ├─>Jean (1378–1457), seigneur de Carency
   │  │  │  │  X 1) Catherine d'Artois (1397–1420)
   │  │  │  │  X 2) Jeanne de Vendomois
   │  │  │  │  │
   │  │  │  │  ├2>Louis(1417–1457)
   │  │  │  │  │
   │  │  │  │  ├2>Jean (1418–)
   │  │  │  │  │
   │  │  │  │  ├2>Jeanne (1419–)
   │  │  │  │  │
   │  │  │  │  ├2>Catherine (1421–)
   │  │  │  │  │
   │  │  │  │  ├2>Pierre (1424–1481), seigneur de Carency
   │  │  │  │  │  X Philipotte de Plaines
   │  │  │  │  │
   │  │  │  │  ├2>Jacques (1425–1494), seigneur de Carency
   │  │  │  │  │  X Antoinette de la Tour (+1450)
   │  │  │  │  │  │
   │  │  │  │  │  ├─>Charles, prince de Carency (1444–1504)
   │  │  │  │  │  │  X 1) Didere de Vergy
   │  │  │  │  │  │  X 2) Antoinette de Chabannes (+1490)
   │  │  │  │  │  │  X 3) Catherine de Tourzel 
   │  │  │  │  │  │
   │  │  │  │  │  ├3>Bertrand, prince de Carency (1494–1515)
   │  │  │  │  │  │
   │  │  │  │  │  ├3>Jean (1500–1520), prince de Carency
   │  │  │  │  │  │
   │  │  │  │  │  ├3>Louise, princesse de Carency
   │  │  │  │  │  │  X François de Perusse des Cars (+1550)
   │  │  │  │  │  │
   │  │  │  │  │  └3>Jean (1446–), seigneur de Rochefort
   │  │  │  │  │     X Jeanne de Lille
   │  │  │  │  │
   │  │  │  │  ├2>Eleonore (1426–)
   │  │  │  │  │
   │  │  │  │  ├2>Andriette (1427–)
   │  │  │  │  │
Maison de Bourbon-Duisant 
   │  │  │  │  └2>Philippe, seigneur de Duisant (1429–1492)
   │  │  │  │     X Catherine de Lalaing (+1475)
   │  │  │  │     │
   │  │  │  │     ├─>Antoine, seigneur de Duisant
   │  │  │  │     │  X Jeanne de Habart
   │  │  │  │     │
   │  │  │  │     ├─>Pierre
   │  │  │  │     │
   │  │  │  │     ├─>Philippe II, seigneur de Duisant (+1530)
   │  │  │  │     │
   │  │  │  │     └─>Jeanne de Bourbon Duisant
   │  │  │  │        X François Rolin, seigneur d'Aymerie
   │  │  │  │
   │  │  │  ├─>Marie, dame de Bréthencourt ((1386)
   │  │  │  │  X Jean de Baynes, seigneur des Croix
   │  │  │  │
   │  │  │  └─>Charlotte (1388–1422)
   │  │  │  │  X Janus of Cyprus (1378–1432)
   │  │  │  │
   │  │  │  └i>Jean, batard de la Marche–1435
   │  │  │
Maison de Bourbon-Preaux
   │  │  └─>Jacques, seigneur de Preaux (1346–1417)
   │  │     X Marguerite de Preaux (+1417)
   │  │     │
   │  │     ├─>Louis, seigneur de Preaux (1389–1415)
   │  │     │
   │  │     ├─>Pierre, seigneur de Preaux (1390–1422)
   │  │     │Elizabeth de Montagu (1397–1429) 
   │  │     │
   │  │     ├─>Jacques II, seigneur de Preaux, baron de Thury (1391–1429)
   │  │     │  X Jeanne de Montagu
   │  │     │
   │  │     ├─>Charles, seigneur de Combles
   │  │     │
   │  │     ├─>Jean (1394–)
   │  │     │
   │  │     └─>Marie, dame de Preaux (1387–1442)
   │  │
   │  └─>Béatrice (1320–1383)
   │  │  X 1) Jean de Luxembourg (+1346), king of Bohemia
   │  │  X 2) Eudes II de Grancey (+1389)
   │  │
   │  ├i>Jean, batard de Bourbon (+1375)
   │  │  X 2) Laure de Bordeaux
   │  │  X 3) Agnes de Chaleu
   │  │  │
   │  │  └─>Gérard de Bourbon
   │  │
   │  ├i>Jeannette
   │  │  X Guichard de Chastellux
   │  │
   │  └i>Guy de Bourbon, seigneur de Cluys
   │     X 2) Jeanne de Chastel-Perron
   │     │
   │     └─>Gérard de Bourbon, seigneur de Clessy
   │        X 1) Jeanne de Chastillon
   │        X 2) Alix de Bourbon-Montperoux
   │        │
   │        └─>Isabelle, Dame de Clessy
   │           X 1) Bernard de Montaigu-Listenois
   │           X 2) Guillaume de Mello, seigneur d'Epoisses
   │
   ├─>Blanche (1281–1304) 
   │  X Robert VII, Count of Auvergne (+1325)
   │
   ├─>Jean (1283–1316), baron de Charolais 
   │  X Jeanne d'Argies
   │  │
   │  ├─>Béatrice (1310–1364), dame de Charolais 
   │  │  X Jean d'Armagnac (+1373)
   │  │
   │  └─>Jeanne (1312–1383) 
   │     X John I, Count of Auvergne (+1386)
   │
   ├─>Pierre (1287–c.1330) prêtre
   │
   ├─>Marie(1285–1372), prieure de Poissy
   │
   └─>Marguerite (1289–1309)
      X Jean (1267–1330), margrave of Namur

== Family trees ==
Simplified family trees showing the relationships between the Bourbons and the other branches of the Royal House of France.

=== From Louis IX to Charles X ===
Direct Capetians
Louis IX; King of France; 1214–1270 r. 1226–1270	Margaret of Provence; 1221–1295
House of Bourbon
Philip III; King of France; 1245–1285 r. 1270–1285	Robert; Count of Clermont; 1256–1317 r. 1268–1317	Beatrice of Burgundy; 1257–1310
House of Valois
Charles; Count of Valois; 1270–1325 r. 1284–1325	Louis I Duke of Bourbon; 1279–1341 r. 1327–1341	Mary of Avesnes; 1280–1354
Philip VI; King of France; 1293–1350 r. 1328–1350
John II; King of France; 1319–1364 r. 1350–1364	Isabella of Valois; 1313–1383	Peter I Duke of Bourbon; 1311–1356 r. 1342–1356	James I Count of La Marche; 1319–1362 r. 1356–1362	Jeanne of Châtillon; 1320-1371
Charles V King of France; 1338–1380 r. 1364–1380	Joanna of Bourbon; 1338–1378	Louis II; Duke of Bourbon; 1337–1410 r. 1356–1410	Peter II; Count of La Marche; 1342–1362 r. 1362	John I Count of La Marche; 1344–1393 r. 1362–1393	Catherine of Vendôme; 1354–1412
Charles VI; King of France; 1368–1422 r. 1380–1422	John I Duke of Bourbon; 1381–1434 r. 1410–1434	Louis I Duke of Orléans; 1372–1407 r. 1392–1407	James II; Count of La Marche; 1370–1438 r. 1393–1438	Louis; Count of Vendôme; 1376–1446 r. 1393–1446	John; Lord of Carency; 1378–1458 r. 1393–1458
Charles VII; King of France; 1403–1461 r. 1422–1461	Charles I Duke of Bourbon; 1401–1456 r. 1434–1456	Louis I Count of Montpensier; 1405–1486 r. 1428–1486	John; Count of Angoulême; 1399–1467	Eleanor of Bourbon-La Marche; 1407–aft.1464	Lords of Carency
Louis XI; King of France; 1423–1483 r. 1461–1483	Joan of France; 1435–1482	John II; Duke of Bourbon; 1426–1488 r. 1456–1488	Charles II; Duke of Bourbon; 1433–1488 r. 1488	Louis; Bishop of Liège; 1438–1482 r. 1456–1482	Gilbert; Count of Montpensier; 1443–1496 r. 1486–1496	Charles; Count of Angoulême; 1459–1496 r. 1467–1496	Dukes of Nemours	John VIII; Count of Vendôme; 1425–1477 r. 1446–1477
Anne of France; 1461–1522	Peter II; Count of La Marche; Duke of Bourbon; 1438–1503 r. 1488–1503	Peter of Bourbon-Busset; 1464–1529	Francis; Count of Vendôme; 1470–1495 r. 1477–1495	Louis; Prince of La Roche-sur-Yon; 1473–1520	Louise; Duchess of Montpensier; 1482–1561 r. 1538–1561
Suzanne; Duchess of Bourbon; 1491–1521 r. 1503–1521	Charles III; Count of La Marche; Duke of Bourbon; 1490–1527 r. 1521–1527	Philip of Bourbon-Busset; 1494–1557	Francis I King of France; 1494–1547 r. 1515–1547	Charles; Duke of Vendôme; 1489–1537 r. 1514–1537	Louis; Duke of Montpensier; 1513-1582 r. 1561–1582
Bourbon-Busset illegitimate male-line	Henry II; King of France; 1519–1559 r. 1547–1559	Jeanne III d'Albret; Queen of Navarre; 1528–1572 r. 1555–1572	Antoine; Duke of Vendôme; King of Navarre; 1518–1562 r. 1555–1562	Louis; Prince of Condé; 1530–1569 r. 1546–1569	Dukes of Montpensier
Margaret of France; 1553–1615	Henry IV of Bourbon; King of France; 1553–1610 r. 1589–1610	Marie de' Medici; 1575–1642	Henri I Prince of Condé; 1552–1588 r. 1569–1588
Louis XIII; King of France; 1601–1643 r. 1610–1643	Henri II; Prince of Condé; 1588–1646 r. 1588–1646
Louis XIV; King of France; 1638–1715 r. 1643–1715	Louis II; Grand Condé; Prince of Condé; 1621–1686 r. 1646–1686	Armand; Prince of Conti; 1629–1666 r. 1629–1666	Philippe I 1640–1701; Duke of Orléans
Henri Jules; Prince of Condé; 1643–1709 r. 1686–1709
Louis; 1661-1711 "Grand Dauphin" of France	{{{La2}}}	Louise Bénédicte de Bourbon; 1676-1753	Louis III; Prince of Condé; 1668–1710 r. 1709–1710	Louise Françoise of Bourbon; 1673–1743	Marie Thérèse de Bourbon; 1666–1732	François Louis; Grand Conti; Prince of Conti; 1664–1709 r. 1685–1709	Louis Armand I Prince of Conti; 1661–1685 r. 1666–1685	Marie Anne de Bourbon; 1666–1739
Louis; 1682–1712; Duke of Burgundy, Dauphin of France	Philip V 1683–1746; King of Naples, Sardinia, and Spain	Louis IV Henri; Prince de Condé; 1692–1740 r. 1710–1740	Marie Anne de Bourbon; 1689–1720	Louise Élisabeth de Bourbon; 1693–1775	Louis Armand II; Prince of Conti; 1695–1727 r. 1709–1727
Louis XV; King of France; 1710-1774 r. 1715–1774	Louis V Joseph; Prince of Condé; 1736–1818 r. 1740–1818	Louis François; Prince of Conti; 1717–1776 r. 1727–1776
Louis; 1729–1765; Dauphin of France	Maria Teresa of Spain; 1726–1746	Louis VI Henri; Prince of Condé; 1756–1830 r. 1818–1830	Louis François Joseph; Prince of Conti; 1734–1814 r. 1776–1814
Louis XVI; King of France; 1754–1793 r. 1774–1792	Louis XVIII; King of France; 1755–1824 r. 1815–1824	Charles X King of France; 1757–1836 r. 1824–1830	Louis Antoine; Duke of Enghien; 1772–1804

=== Descent from Henry IV ===
see also:Family tree of Spanish monarchs

Henry IV; King of France (1589–1610)
Louis XIII; King of France (1610–1643)
Louis XIV; King of France (1643–1715)	Philippe I Duke of Orléans
Louis "Le Grand Dauphin" of France	Philippe II; Duke of Orléans; Regent of France
Louis "Le Petit Dauphin" of France	Philip V King of Spain (1700–1746)	Louis; Duke of Orléans
Louis XV; King of France (1715–1774)	Louis I King of Spain (1724)	Ferdinand VI; King of Spain (1746–1759)	Charles III; King of Spain (1759–1788)	Philip; Duke of Parma (1748–1765)	Louis Philippe I Duke of Orléans
Louis; Dauphin of France	Charles IV; King of Spain (1788–1808)	Ferdinand; Duke of Parma (1765–1802)	Louis Philippe II (Philippe Égalité); Duke of Orléans
Louis XVI; King of France (1774–1791); King of the French (1791–1792); Titular King of France (1792–1793)	Louis XVIII; Titular King of France (1795–1804); Legitimist pretender (1804–1814); King of France (1814–1824)	Charles X King of France (1824–1830); Legitimist pretender (1830–1836)	Ferdinand VII; King of Spain (1808; 1813–1833)	Francisco de Paula	Carlos; Count of Molina Carlos V Carlist pretender (1833–1845)	Louis I King of Etruria (1801–1803)	Louis Philippe I King of the French (1830–1848); Orléanist pretender (1848–1850)
Louis; Dauphin of France as Louis XVII; Titular King of France (1793–1795)	Louis-Antoine; Duke of Angoulême Dauphin of France as Louis XIX; Legitimist pretender (1836–1844)	Charles Ferdinand; Duke of Berry	Isabella II; Queen of Spain (1833–1868)	Francis; Duke of Cádiz; King consort of Spain	Carlos; Count of Montemolin Carlos VI; Carlist pretender (1845–1861)	Juan; Count of Montizón Juan III; Carlist pretender (1861–1868) as Jean III; Legitimist pretender (1883–1887)	Louis II; King of Etruria (1803–1807) Charles I Duke of Lucca (1824–1847) Charles II; Duke of Parma (1847–1849)	Ferdinand Philippe; Duke of Orléans
Henri; Count of Chambord as Henri V Legitimist pretender (1844–1883)	Alfonso XII; King of Spain (1874–1885)	Carlos; Duke of Madrid Carlos VII; Carlist pretender (1868–1909) as Charles XI; Legitimist pretender (1887–1909)	Alfonso Carlos; Duke of San Jaime Alfonso Carlos I Carlist pretender (1931–1936) as Charles XII; Legitimist pretender (1931–1936)	Charles III; Duke of Parma (1849–1854)	Philippe; Count of Paris as Philippe VII; Orléanist pretender (1850–1894)	Robert; Duke of Chartres
Alfonso XIII; King of Spain (1886–1931) as Alphonse I Legitimist pretender (1936–1941)	Jaime; Duke of Madrid Jaime III; Carlist pretender (1909–1931) as Jacques I Legitimist pretender (1909–1931)	Robert I Duke of Parma (1854–1859)	Philippe; Duke of Orléans as Philippe VIII; Orléanist pretender (1894–1926)	Jean; Duke of Guise as Jean III; Orléanist pretender (1926–1940)
Jaime; Duke of Segovia Jaime IV; Carlist pretender (1941–1969) as Jacques II or Henri VI; Legitimist pretender (1941–1975)	Juan; Count of Barcelona	Xavier; Duke of Parma; Carlist regent (1936–1952) Javier I Carlist pretender (1952–1977)	Felix; Prince of Luxembourg	Henri; Count of Paris as Henri VI; Orléanist pretender (1940–1999)
Alfonso; Duke of Anjou and Cádiz as Alphonse II; Legitimist pretender (1975–1989)	Juan Carlos I King of Spain (1975–2014)	Carlos Hugo; Duke of Parma Carlos Hugo I Carlist pretender (1977–1979)	Sixtus Henry; Prince of Parma Enrique V Carlist pretender (1979–present)	Jean; Grand Duke of Luxembourg (1964–2000)	Henri; Count of Paris; Duke of France as Henri VII; Orléanist pretender (1999–2019)
Louis; Duke of Anjou as Louis XX; Legitimist pretender (1989–present)	Felipe VI; King of Spain (2014–present)	Carlos; Duke of Parma Carlos Xavier II; Carlist pretender (2011–present)	Henri; Grand Duke of Luxembourg (2000–2025)	Jean; Count of Paris as Jean IV; Orléanist pretender (2019–present)
Louis; Duke of Burgundy; Dauphin of France	Leonor; Princess of Asturias	Carlos; Prince of Piacenza	Guillaume V Grand Duke of Luxembourg (2025–present)	Gaston; Count of Clermont

== See also ==
- Armorial of the Capetian dynasty
- Members of the House of Bourbon
- Bourbon County, Kentucky, USA, named after the royal family
- Bourbon Street in New Orleans, also named for the royal house
- Bourbon whiskey, named for either the street or the county and in either case therefore indirectly for the royal house
- Bourbonnais
- Bourbons of India
- File:Habsburg-bourbon-parma-2siciliesX.png: A chart of the dynastic links among the royal houses of Habsburg, Bourbon, Bourbon-Parma and Bourbon-Two Sicilies
- Le Retour des Princes français à Paris

== Sources ==
- Holt, Mack P. (1995). The French Wars of Religion, 1562–1629. Cambridge University Press.
- Knecht, R. J. (2014). The French Civil Wars, 1562–1598. Routledge.
- Levi, Anthony (2004). Louis XIV. Constable.

— Royal house — House of Bourbon Cadet branch of the Capetian dynasty Founding year: 1272
Preceded by House of Valois	Ruling house of France; 1589–1792	Monarchy abolished See French Revolution; eventually House of Bonaparte
Preceded by House of Bonaparte as French Emperor	Ruling house of France; 1814–1830	Succeeded by House of Orléans
Preceded by House of Habsburg	Ruling house of the Duchy of Burgundy and the Burgundian Netherlands; 1700–1713	Succeeded by House of Habsburg
Preceded by House of Habsburg	Ruling house of Spain; 1700–1808	Succeeded by House of Bonaparte
Vacant Title last held by House of Trastámara	Ruling House of Naples and Sicily; 1753–1806	Succeeded by House of Bonaparte
Preceded by House of Bonaparte	Ruling house of the Kingdom of the Two Sicilies; 1815–1860	Kingdom abolished Italian unification under the House of Savoy
Preceded by House of Bonaparte	Ruling house of Spain; 1813–1868	Interregnum; Bourbon Monarchy overthrown in Glorious Revolution; eventually House of Savoy
Vacant Title last held by House of Savoy	Ruling House of Spain; 1885–1931	Second Republic Declared
Vacant Spanish State Title last held by House of Bourbon	Ruling House of Spain; 1975–present	Incumbent
Preceded by House of Nassau-Weilburg	Ruling house of Luxembourg; 1964–present	Incumbent
