= Peter II of La Marche =

French count

Coat-of-arms of Peter II, Count of La Marche.

Pierre (Peter) of Bourbon-La Marche (1342 – 1362 in Lyon) was the eldest son of James I, Count of La Marche, and Jeanne of Chatillon, and was a French prince du sang.

He was knighted by his father shortly before the Battle of Brignais, in which both father and son fought. Both were mortally wounded during the battle, but were carried away by their soldiers to Lyon. He survived his father only a short while, and was succeeded by his brother Jean.

== Sources ==
- Villalon, Andrew; Kagay, Donald (2017). To Win and Lose a Medieval Battle: Nájera (April 3, 1367), A Pyrrhic Victory for the Black Prince. Leiden: Brill. ISBN 978-90-04-34317-7.
- Thompson, James Westfall (1909). The Wars of Religion in France, 1559-1576. Chicago: The University of Chicago Press.

French nobility
Preceded by James I	Count of La Marche; 1362	Succeeded by John I
