= Petit Meschin =

French soldier, mercenary and brigand

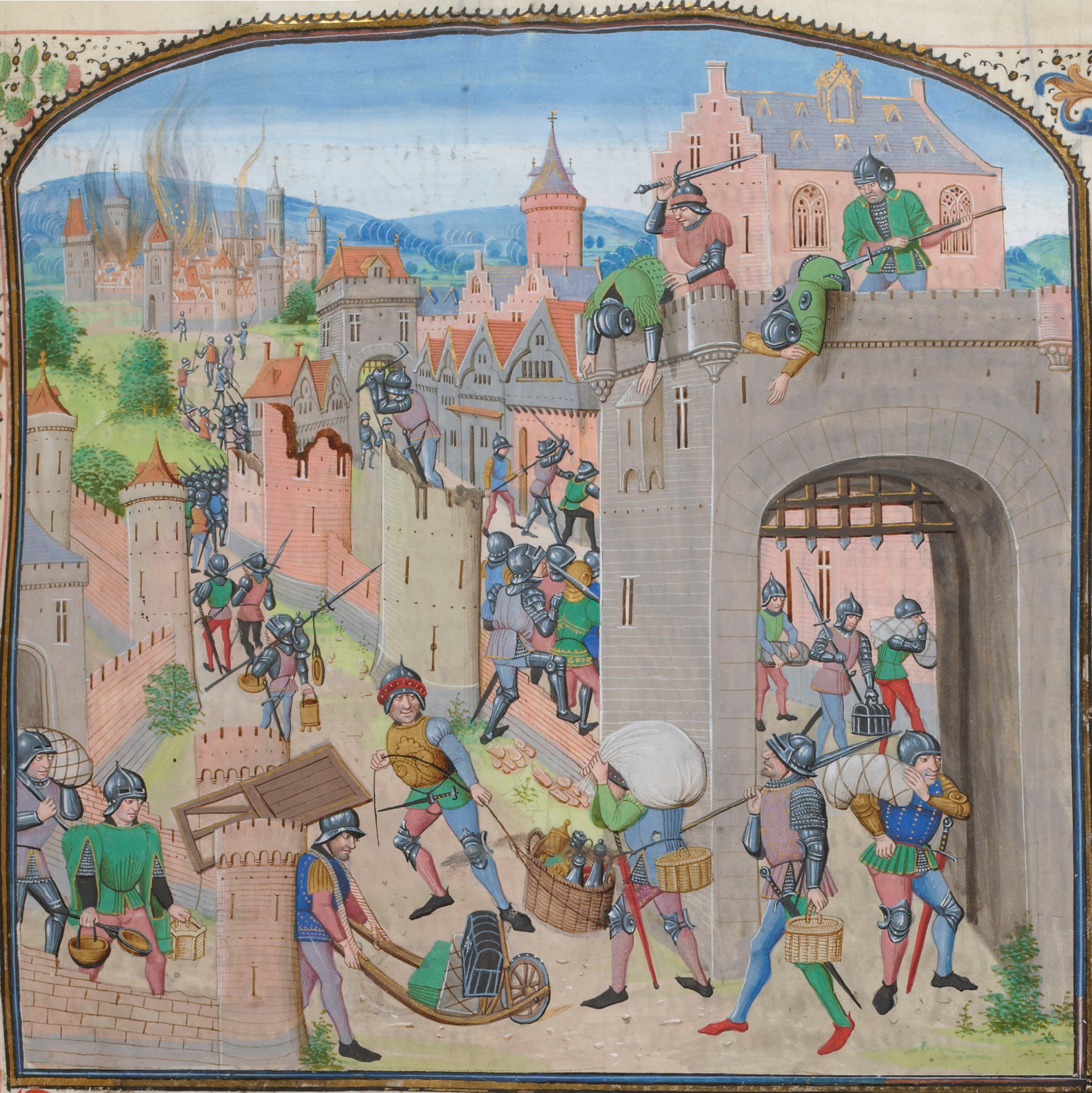
Tard-Venus pillage Grammont

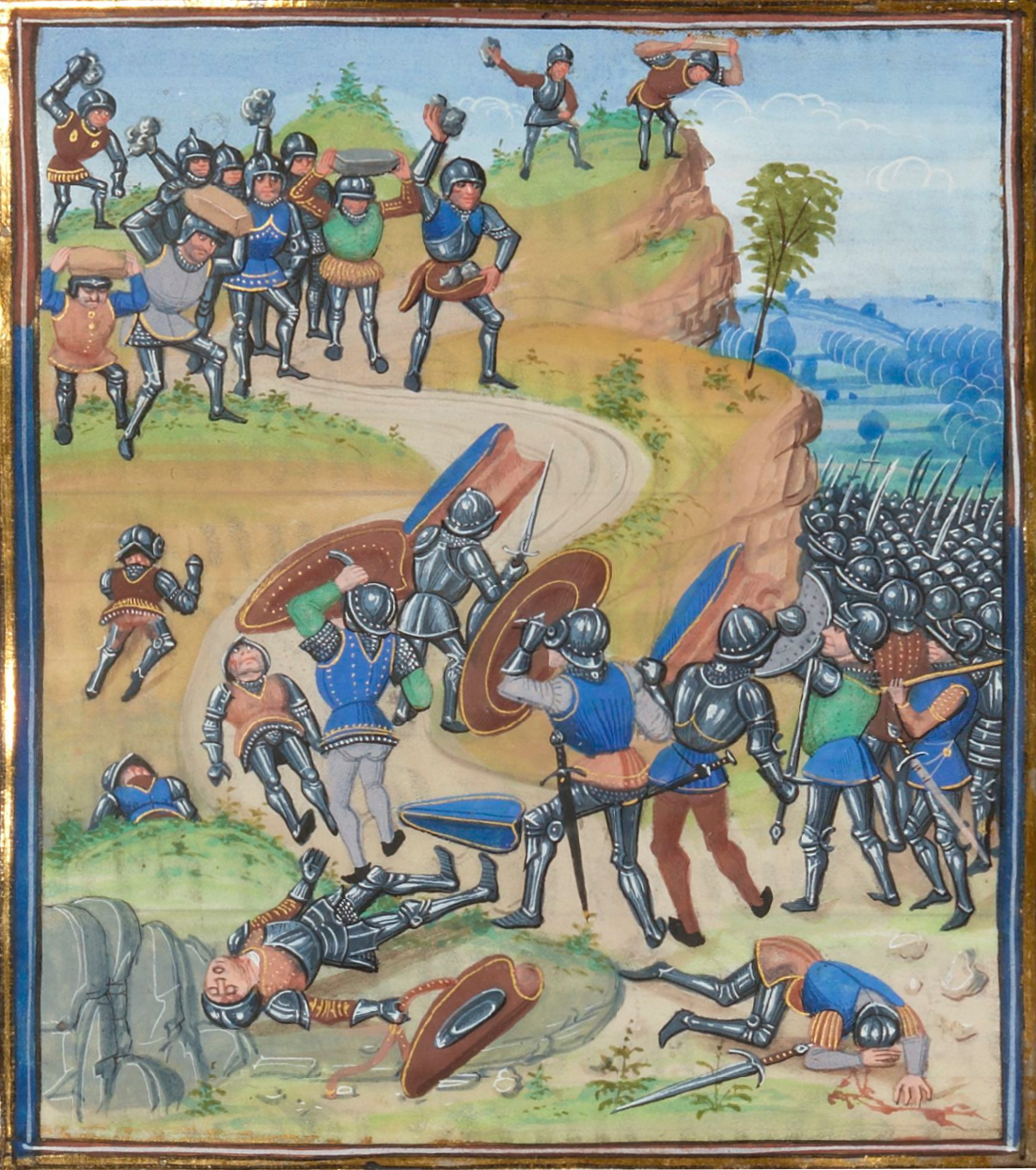
Battle of Brignais

Perin de Sasine, known by his alias Le Petit Meschin, was a French soldier, mercenary and brigand of the Hundred Years War in the 14th century.

Originally from Gascon he was a soldier in his youth but in 1363, after the Treaty of Brétigny, Meschin and his men began to pillage the countryside. His was one of the many so called Tard-Venus bands, groups of mercenaries left without employment by the end of hostilities.

In early January 1362, the Tard-Venus invaded Forez and Meschin held the priory of Estivareilles.

King John II commissioned Count Jacques de Bourbon and Jean de Tancarville to raise an army to put down the "Free Companies" before they could overrun Burgundy. Bourbon and Tancarville gathered their army at Brignais.

The French King's forces besieged the town of Brignais, which had been seized by the Companies in March as an operating base. Believing that the companies would not dare challenge them in the open, the royal forces took few steps to secure their camp and when the companies attacked that morning of 6 April 1362 they were taken completely by surprise. In the battle that followed the government army was routed and James Bourbon and his oldest son were mortally wounded.

Le Petit Meschin was taken prisoner in 1368, by the Bailiff of Franche-Comté, Huart Raincheval, and executed by drowning in the Garonne river at Toulouse on 11 May 1369.
