= James I of La Marche =

French prince and Count of Ponthieu (1344–1393)

Jacques I
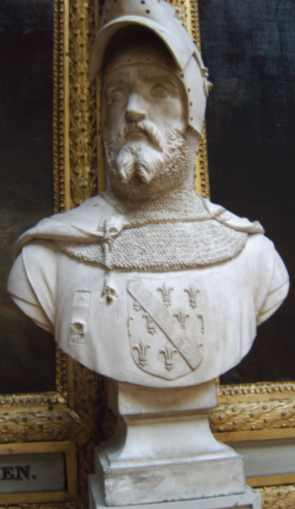

Count of Ponthieu
- Reign: 1351 – 1360
- Predecessor: Edward III, King of England
- Successor: Edward III, King of England

Count of La Marche
- Reign: 1341 – 6 April 1362
- Predecessor: Louis I, Duke of Bourbon
- Successor: Pierre II
- Born: 1319
- Died: 6 April 1362 (aged 42–43); Lyon, Kingdom of France
- Spouse: Jeanne of Châtillon
- Issue: Isabelle de Bourbon, Pierre II, Count of La Marche, Jean I, Count of La Marche, Jacques de Bourbon
- House: Bourbon
- Father: Louis I, Duke of Bourbon
- Mother: Mary of Avesnes

James I of Bourbon (French Jacques Ier de Bourbon; 1319 – 6 April 1362), was a French prince du sang, and the son of Louis I, Duke of Bourbon, and Mary of Avesnes. He was Count of Ponthieu from 1351 to 1360, and Count of La Marche from 1341 to his death.

== Hundred Years War ==
The coat-of-arms of James I, Count of La Marche.

He took part in several campaigns of the Hundred Years War.

In June 1347 he commanded an army on the Flemish border together with the Marshal Robert de Waurin. They marched to Béthune, the chief city of north-eastern Artois, which was still in French hands, though the countryside had been overrun by the Flemish. There they gathered together most of the French border forces including the Béthune garrison, Charles de Montmorency (1325–1381) from the sector around Lille and Charles de la Cerda with most of the men from Aire and Saint-Omer. On 13 June 1347, they attacked the Flemish camp at night. However the Flemings managed to regroup and launch a counter-attack before slipping across the border.

In 1349, he was created Captain-General of Languedoc. Following the fall of Calais in 1347 a truce had been concluded, but in 1349 open warfare broke out again, the most conspicuous event of that year being Henry of Grosmont, 1st Duke of Lancaster's raid deep into Languedoc to the walls of Toulouse. As the new year started, James was given command of an army mustering at Moissac on the borders of Agenais. This he did 22 February 1350. There, he almost immediately entered into negotiations with Lancaster with two papal legates acting as mediators. The result was a truce, at first limited to Languedoc and the other provinces where James was Lieutenant, but in April it was extended to the rest of France.

== Navarre joins the war ==
In 1354 he was appointed Constable of France. In January and February 1355 as Constable, he took part in planning the resumption of the war with England. However the war soon became a matter of secondary importance as the French government became embroiled in the intrigues of Charles II of Navarre. By May, it became apparent that open war was about to begin between the King of France and a King of Navarre allied to England. James belonged to the party fronted by the dowager queens, Jeanne and Blanche d'Évreux, who lobbied John on Charles's behalf. In the end, John gave way and, on 31 May 1355, agreed to pardon Charles.

However, by the time John II's letters reached Pamplona, the capital of Navarre, Charles and his army had already embarked with a course for the Cotentin Peninsula in Normandy. When the news reached Paris on 4 June 1355, it therefore became necessary to prepare the defences of Normandy. Two armies were formed. The largest, of which the Constable was given command, was to be stationed at Caen. He was also appointed one of three conciliators who were to meet with Charles of Navarre as soon as he landed and explain the king's new position. Charles of Navarre arrived at Cherbourg 5 July and the negotiations opened soon after. The result was the Treaty of Valognes, sealed on 10 September 1355. Included among the provisions of the treaty was that seven of Charles' walled towns and castles in Normandy should be nominally surrendered to the Constable.

== War in Toulouse ==
In autumn the Constable was in the south where he, together with John I, Count of Armagnac, who commanded an army of local troops, and the Marshal Jean de Clermont were to defend against the expected invasion of the Edward, Prince of Wales. When the Prince of Wales struck in October it was further south than expected, in the County of Armagnac, rather than the Garonne valley. The three French commanders hurried south to Toulouse, where they prepared themselves for a siege. On 28 October 1355, the Prince crossed the Garonne and the Ariège, at places never before forded by horses, and marched north to within a few miles of Toulouse. Thinking the English might attempt to invest the city from both sides, the Constable left for Montauban to hold the crossings of the Tarn and the Garonne. Instead, the Prince continued eastward into lands previously untouched by the war and largely undefended. On 8 November he took Narbonne, but was now far away from home territory. The Constable and Armagnac followed him east and taking up camp at the town of Homps on the river Aude seem first to have intended to cut off retreat and force him to battle on their own terms. In the end, no battle took place, as the French commanders decided to withdraw west towards Toulouse.

During the English return westward serious disagreements over strategy broke out in Toulouse. During the whole campaign Armagnac had insisted on avoiding battle at all cost, concentrating on defending the principal cities and river crossings, thus abandoning the countryside to the English. This was deeply frustrating to the people of Languedoc and also resented by James who longed for action. The last opportunity to stop the English was made at the river Save, but after watching the enemy for several days Armagnac on 21 November broke the bridges across the river and withdrew north. The Prince of Wales crossed the river the next day and on 28 November was back in English held territory. The French conduct of the defence was deeply unpopular in the south and although the Constable had not agreed to Armagnac's strategy and gave the King his own eye-witness account he could not escape the blame directed against the three commanders.

On 12 November 1355, the day following Edward III of England's return to Calais, after a largely fruitless raid into Picardy, James and the Marshal Arnoul d'Audrehem were behind an abortive proposal to settle the war in single combat between the two kings.

== Battle of Poitiers ==
Weary of political intrigues, he resigned the constableship in May 1356, but fought at the Battle of Poitiers that year where he was taken prisoner by the English. His ransom was sold by Jean III de Grailly, captal de Buch and five of his companions for 25,000 écus to the Prince of Wales. James was released by the Treaty of Brétigny. The same treaty surrendered Ponthieu to the English; but he had succeeded his brother Duke Peter of La Marche after the latter's death at Poitiers.

== Death ==
The peace promised by the treaty proved illusory. While the English were at peace with France, the discharged mercenary companies found new employment by ravaging the countryside and holding whole cities for ransom. Soon after his return from captivity, King John II commissioned James and Jean de Tancarville to raise an army to put down the "Free Companies" under the informal leadership of Petit Meschin before they could overrun Burgundy. Bourbon and Tancarville gathered their army at Brignais. Never dreaming that the companies would dare challenge them in the open they took few steps to secure their camp and when the companies attacked that morning of 6 April 1362 they were taken completely by surprise. In the battle that followed the governmental army was routed and James and his oldest son were mortally wounded.

== Marriage and children ==
In 1335, he married Jeanne of Châtillon, daughter of Hugh of Châtillon, Lord of Leuze.
Their children:

- Isabelle (1340–1371), married Louis II, Viscount of Beaumont-au-Maine, in Lyon (1362); married Bouchard VII, Count of Vendôme (1364);
- Pierre II, Count of La Marche (1342–1362)
- Jean I, Count of La Marche (1344–1393), married Catherine of Vendome
- Jacques de Bourbon, Baron de Thury (1346–1417), married (c. 1385) Marguerite, dame de Preaux, de Dangu and de Thury.

== Sources ==
- Perry, Guy (2018). The Briennes:The Rise and Fall of a Champenois Dynasty in the Age of the Crusades, C. 950-1356. Cambridge: Cambridge University Press. ISBN 978-1107196902.
- Potter, David (1995). Keen, Maurice (ed.). A History of France, 1460–1560: The Emergence of a Nation State. New York: Macmillan. ISBN 978-0312124809.
- Sumption, Jonathan (1999). The Hundred Years War:Trial by Fire. Vol. II. Philadelphia: University of Pennsylvania Press.
- Thompson, James Westfall (1909). The Wars of Religion in France, 1559-1576. Chicago: The University of Chicago Press.
- Villalon, Andrew; Kagay, Donald (2017). To Win and Lose a Medieval Battle: Nájera (April 3, 1367), A Pyrrhic Victory for the Black Prince. Leiden: Brill. ISBN 978-9004343177.

James I of La Marche House of Bourbon Cadet branch of the Capetian dynasty Born: 1319 Died: 6 April 1362
Preceded by Edward III	Count of Ponthieu; 1351–1360	Succeeded by Merged into English Crown
Preceded by Peter I	Count of La Marche; 1341–1362	Succeeded by Peter II
