= Bourbons of India =

Putative Indian noble family

House of Bourbon-Bhopal
- Country: India
- Current head: Prince Balthazar Napoléon IV de Bourbon, Count of Clermont
- Titles: Former titles: Count of Clermont; Duke of Shergar
- Style: Royal Highness

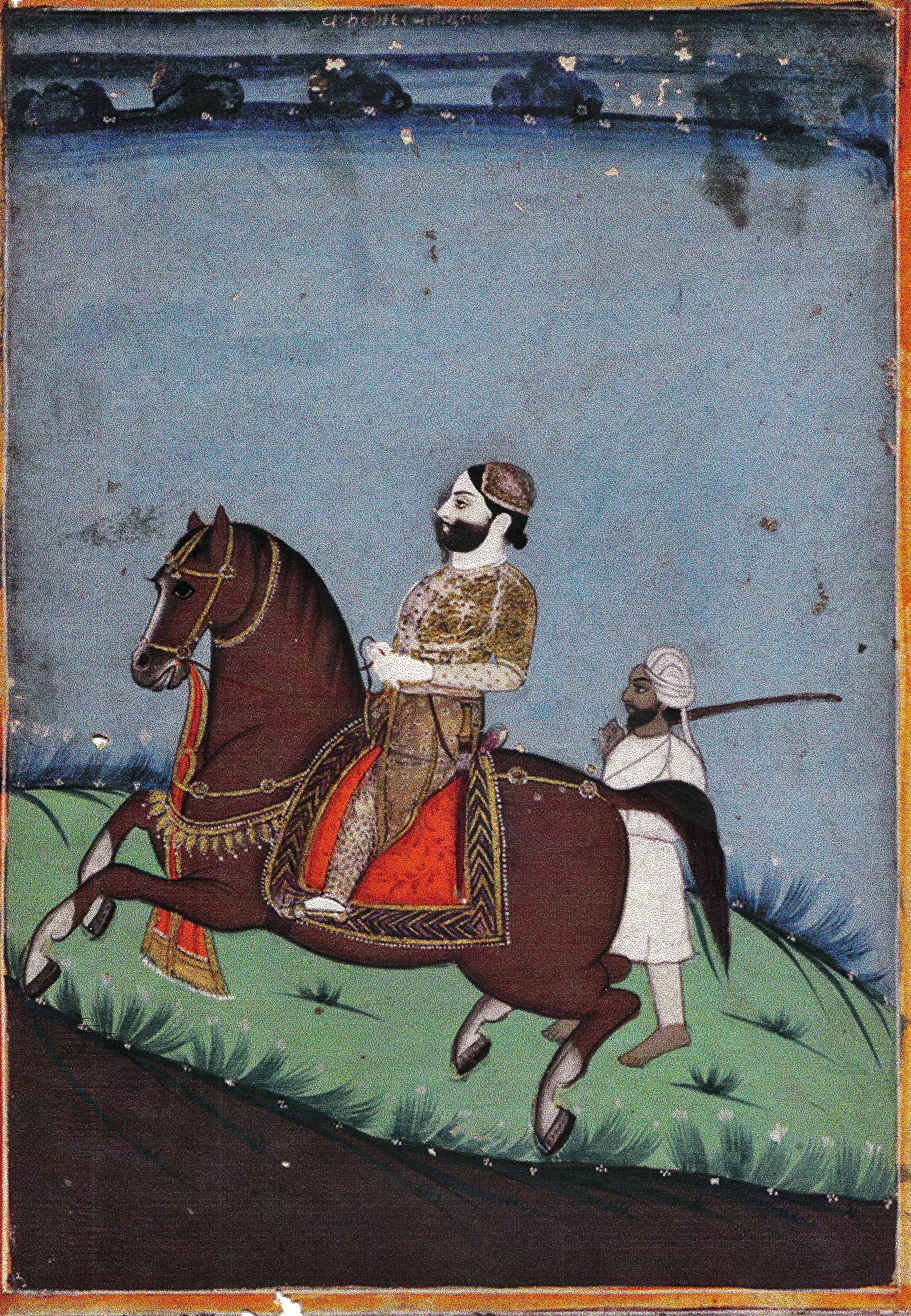
Painting of Balthazar I

The Bourbons of India (French: Bourbons des Indes) are an Indian family who claim to be legitimate heirs of the House of Bourbon, descended from Jean Philippe de Bourbon, Count of Clermont-en-Beauvaisis, an exiled French noble who served in the Mughal emperor Akbar's court after landing in the country in 1560. The family is also known as the House of Bourbon-Bhopal, a name derived from the city of Bhopal in central India, where their last few generations resided and held positions in the pre-independent Indian Bhopal State royal court. Prior to the move of the family to Bhopal, the House of Bourbon-Bhopal ruled over Shergar and the heads were known as the Rajas of Shergar.

== History ==
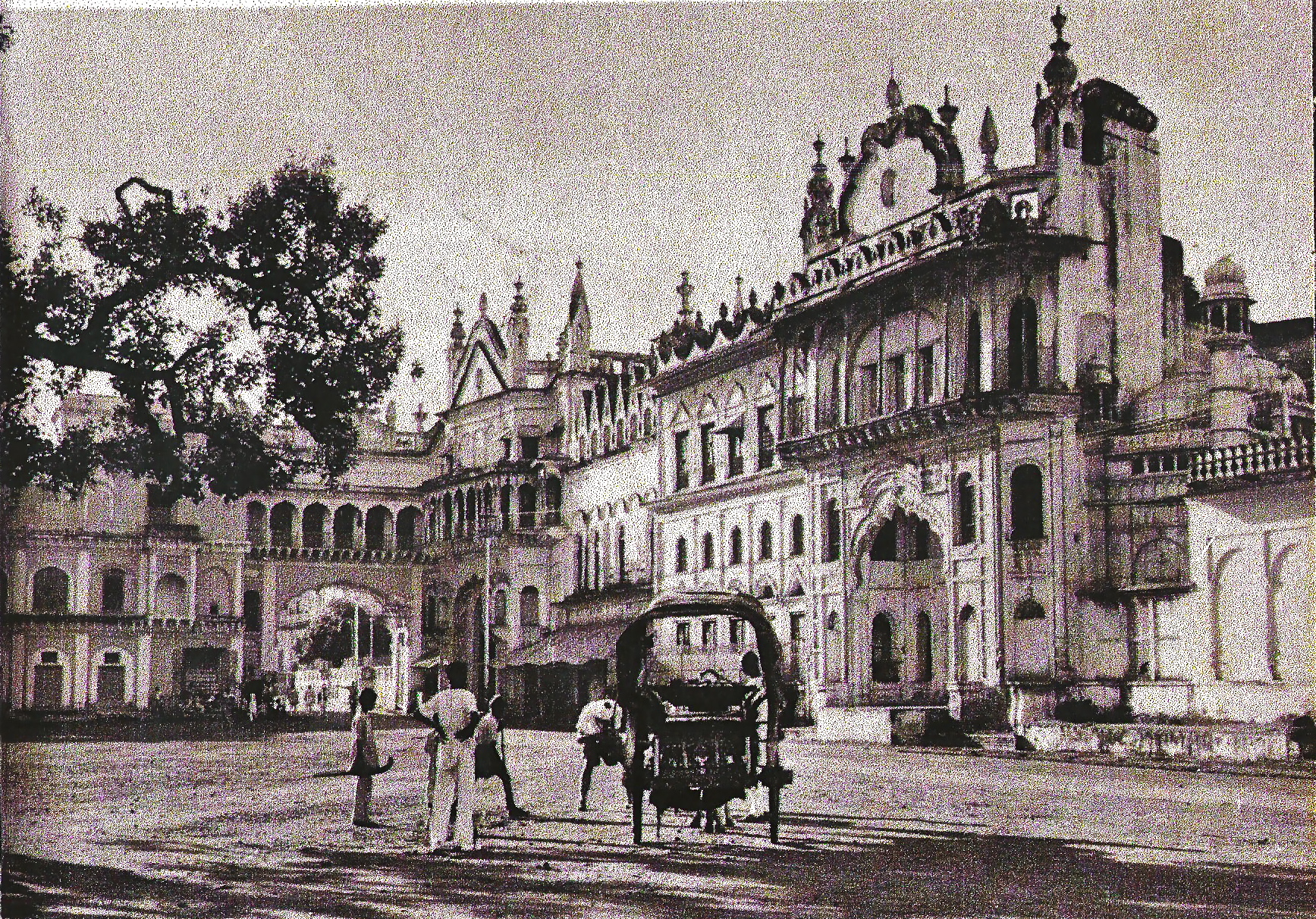
Shoukat Mahal

Traveller and photographer Louis Rousselet wrote in Le Fils du Connétable (Rousselet 1882) when he had visited Isabella de Bourbon, known in the Court as Bourbon Sirdar, and got struck by her "European type". This is his account of his surprise to find a Bourbon Princess in Bhopal:

When everyone was seated, the priest said to me, "On hearing of your arrival I should have hastened to come and see you for it is long since I had the pleasure of meeting fellow countryman, but I was compelled to delay my visit for a reason you will easily understand. I reside here in the capacity of chaplain in Madame Isabelle de Bourbon, a Christian princess who holds the first place of the kingdom after the Begum. This lady greatly hoped that you would have gone to see her soon after your arrival, and she waited for you impatiently. Being only her servant, I was myself obliged until she herself, authorize me to seek you. Today I am sent by her to tell you that she will expect you tomorrow at her palace, at whatever hour you may choose to appoint."

I listened to the priest while he spoke, but without being able to believe my ears. My wanderings had doubtless been fruitful of many unexpected events, but to arrive at Bhopal and find a French priest, chaplain to a Christian princess, and to hear that this princess was the most important personage in the kingdom, and bore the name of Bourbon, this seemed to me to verge on the fabulous and I looked on the worthy ecclesiastic, asking myself whether there were not some mystifications under it all. However, at last I agreed to accept the invitation of the mysterious princess, and he left us to carry the news to her.

When he was gone, I questioned the Bhopal's nobles who were present, and they confirmed the words of the priest. The princess now some sixty-six summers; she was called Bourbon Sirdar, or Princess Bourbon. It was also true she was very rich, possessed important fiefs, and held high rank among the vassals of the crown. My curiosity was greatly excited, and the next morning I mounted the elephant, accompanied by Schaumburg, and proceeded to the residence of the princess.

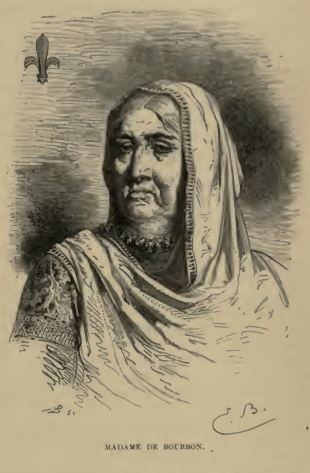
Madame Elizabeth de Bourbon in May 1867

Kincaid's account of Jean de Bourbon's exile and settlement in India reads:

In the latter half of the sixteenth century, about the year 1560, Jean Philippe de Bourbon, who was a member of a branch of the Bourbons sailed for India, having, tradition relates, been obliged to leave France because he killed a relative of high position in a duel. He landed at Madras, a priest and two friends accompanying him. The two latter died on the voyage, and the priest remained at Madras, but John Philip Bourbon, sailing on to Bengal went thence to Delhi and sought an interview with the Emperor Akbar. On hearing of the high rank of the exile, the Emperor sent for him, and being interested in his story, treated him with much favour and distinction, eventually appointing him to a post at his Court. Not long afterwards the Emperor being much pleased at his courtly bearing and conduct, and desiring to retain his services, offered him in marriage to the Lady Juliana, sister of the Emperor's Christian wife, who on account of her skill and her knowledge of the European system of medicine, had charge of the health of the imperial ladies. This marriage was duly solemnised, whereupon the Emperor conferred upon his brother-in-law the title of Raja of Shergar and placed the imperial seraglio under his care and the Lady Juliana was included in the select band of the imperial sisters. The honourable office conferred on the Bourbons remained in the possession of the family until the sack of Delhi by Nadir Shah in the year 1737.

— Colonel William Kincaid, Kincaid 1887

Colonel William Kincaid wrote that in Agra, Lady Juliana had directed the construction of the first Christian church there. More detailed accounts can be found in Malcolm 1824, pp. 341, Kincaid 1908 and Kincaid 1946 (both written by Charles Augustus, William Kincaid's son), and Diver & Diver 1942, pp. 170 et seq. The family held the position of Governor of the Imperial Seraglio until the fall of Delhi after the invasion of Nader Shah in 1739 when Francis II (1718–1778) moved to their principality of Shergar (Sirghur) to be the last Raja of Shergar. He was attacked by the troops of the Raja of Narwar in 1778 (General Sir John Malcolm 1823) and died alongside most of the family. His surviving son Salvadore II and his two sons moved to Gwalior and finally to Bhopal.

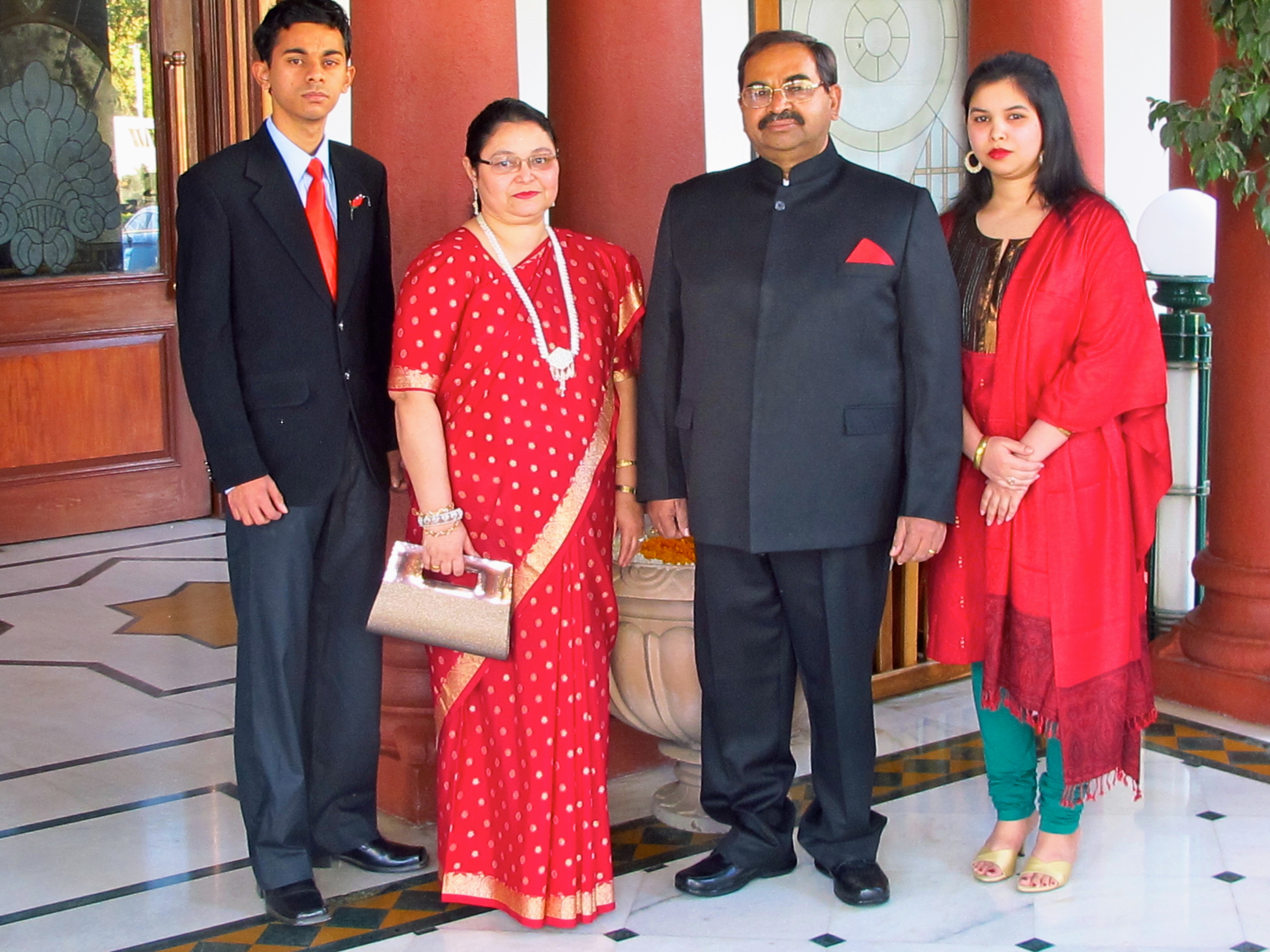
Balthazar Napoleon IV de Bourbon with his family in 2013

All the members of the Bourbons of India were known at the Bhopal Court by Indo-Persianate names. They were the most influential and wealthiest family in Bhopal, second only to the Nawabs of Bhopal. The most prominent members of the family were Balthazar of Bourbon-Shazad Masih (1772–1829), son of Salvadore II. He became prime minister in 1820 until he was poisoned by Afghan nobles in 1829. Masih married an English lady, Isabella Johnston, the princess that French traveler Rousellet met. Their son, Sebastian of Bourbon-Mehrban Masih (1830–1878) was appointed prime minister (1857) to the Begums and built one of the most beautiful palaces in Bhopal, the Shaukat Mahal, and the Catholic Church of Bhopal, on land bequeathed by his mother Princess Isabella (died 1852). The Bourbons of India use the title Masih after their names, a "tradition of honouring Christians as well as a common North Indian Christian surname". Eventually, the family fell out of favour during the last two reigns. After Indian independence, the Indian state abolished the old jagirs (land entitlements) in 1948, and royal and noble status in 1971. Deprived of any privileges, the family joined the ranks of the working bourgeoisie.

The Bourbons of India are certain that their direct ancestor Jean Phillipe was the secret son of the Constable of France and his wife Duchess Suzanne, according to family oral traditions. Though there are no records of Jean Phillipe of Bourbon in official family genealogy of the House of Bourbon, Prince Michael of Greece, in his book Le Rajah Bourbon (Michel de Grece 2007), gives a very plausible explanation of this, and he believes this branch of the Bourbons to be the oldest branch of the family. There are other, different accounts of Jean de Bourbon's possible lineage. One has the constable survive the sack of Rome and eventually marry a Mughal princess named Alaïque, Jean Philippe's mother. Another possible candidate is a member of the Bourbon-Busset branch, reported lost at sea in 1580, though the dates do not match.

Balthazar Napoleon IV de Bourbon, the current head of the family of Bourbons in India, is the son of Salvadore de Bourbon (1917–1978), who claimed the lineage in his memoir Les Bourbons de l'Inde, (de Bourbon 2003) which was edited by Lucien Jailloux and published posthumously with a preface written by historian of India and member of L'École Française d'Extrème-Orient Jean Deloche.

Salvadore de Bourbon's work is based upon nineteenth-century articles by people such as Claude Sosthène Grasset d'Orcet writing in La Revue britannique (d'Orcet 1892), Gabriel Ferrand writing in La Revue de Paris (Ferrand 1905), and Colonel William Kincaid's Historical sketch of the Indian Bourbon family (Kincaid 1883). The story goes that Jean Phillippe (simply "Jean de Bourbon" in some accounts), the secret son of Charles de Bourbon, Duke of Bourbon, the so-called "Constable of Bourbon", arrived in the court of Mughal emperor Akbar in 1560, relating a tale of his journey there that included pirates, kidnapping, and an attempt to sell him in a slave market in Cairo. Prince Michael of Greece has incorporated this into a historical novel, Le Rajah Bourbon (Michel de Grèce 2007), whose publication spurred a renewed interest in this claim to the French throne.

== Orders of chivalry ==
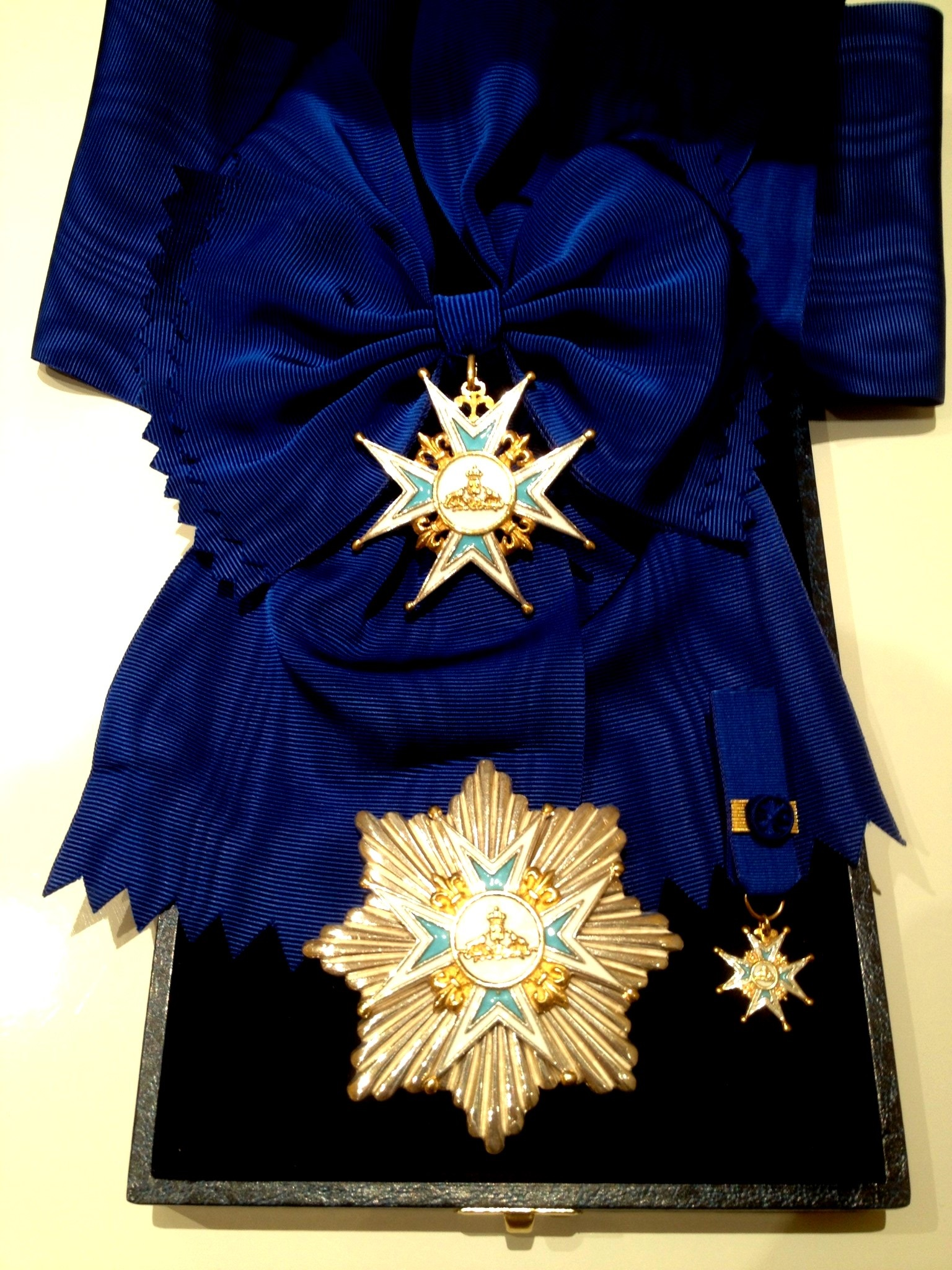
The Royal Order of Shergar, bestowed by the Royal House of Bourbon-Bhopal

The House of Bourbon-Bhopal awards the Royal Order of Shergar and the Royal Order of Princess Isabella. The former is in reference to the Shergarh Fort, as the title of "Raja of Shergar" was bestowed upon Jean Philippe de Bourbon.

== Claim to the throne of France ==
The current head of the Bourbon-Bhopal family is Balthazar Napoleon IV de Bourbon, a lawyer by profession. De Bourbon's claim of link to the Bourbons of France was endorsed by Prince Michael of Greece in his historical novel, Le Rajah Bourbon (Michel de Grèce 2007). The novel, described by the Los Angeles Times as "an amalgam of conjecture and research", offers a speculative biography of de Bourbon's purported ancestor Jean Philippe de Bourbon. According to the novel, Jean Philippe was a nephew of King Henry IV, which would technically make Balthazar Napoleon the eldest in line to the French throne. The author states that he completely believes in his theory, although he does not have absolute proof of it.

In 2008, Prince Michael favoured a DNA test, "perhaps from a surviving lock of Bourbon hair", to verify de Bourbon's claim of kinship. De Bourbon stated that he was ready to undergo the DNA test, but that he wanted to know "if the original samples will be available for matching since there were frequent inter-marriages among European royal families."

== See also ==
- House of Bourbon
- Balthazar Napoleon IV de Bourbon, head of the Indian branch of the family
- List of heirs to the French throne
