= Balthazar Napoléon IV de Bourbon =

Indian pretender to the throne of the Kingdom of France since 1978

Balthazar Napoléon IV
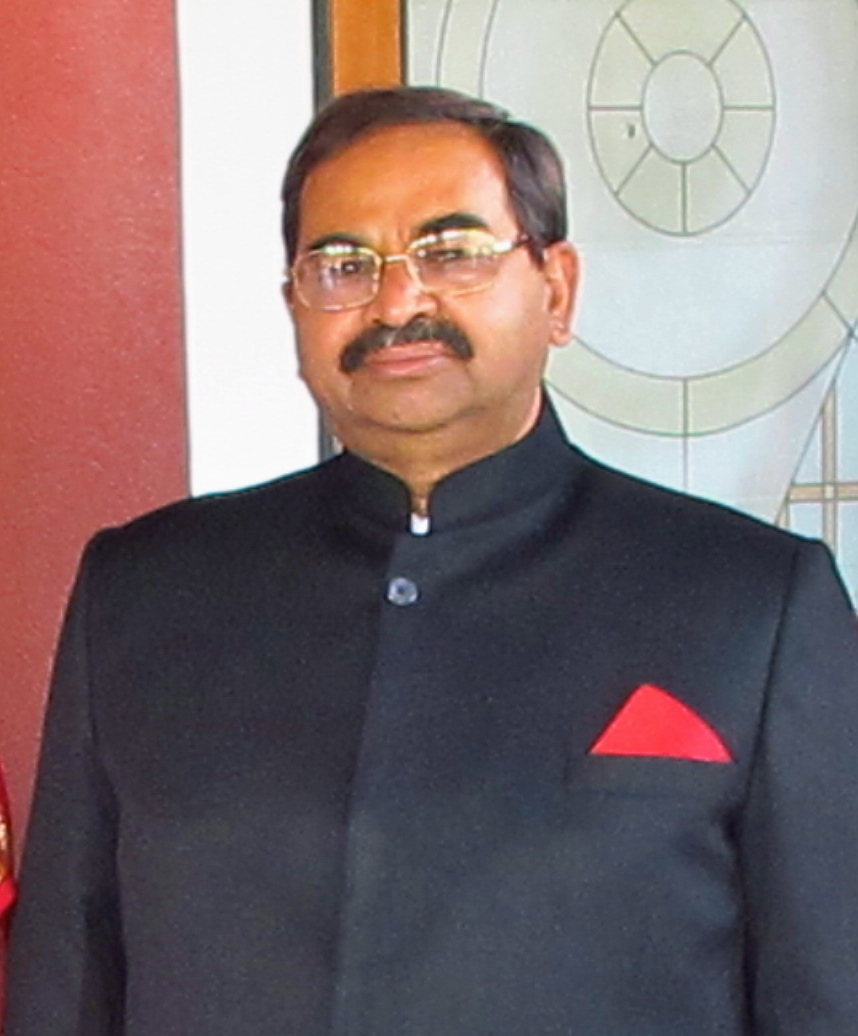
- Balthazar Napoléon IV, by Thubten Namdrol, 2013

Bourbon-Bhopal pretender to the French throne
- Tenure: 9 October 1978 – present
- Predecessor: Salvador III
- Heir apparent: Frederick, Duke of Shergar
- Born: 29 July 1958 (age 68); Bhopal, India
- Spouse: Elisha Pacheco
- Issue: Frederick de Bourbon, Duke of Shergar; Michelle de Bourbon; Adrian de Bourbon
Names
- Balthazar Napoléon IV de Bourbon
- House: Bourbon-Bhopal
- Father: Salvador III de Bourbon
- Mother: Mary Matilde Green
- Religion: Catholicism
- Occupation: Lawyer, part-time farmer

Balthazar Napoléon IV de Bourbon (born 29 July 1957) is an Indian lawyer and farmer, who claims to be the senior descendant of the House of Bourbon and is thus the pretender to the Crown of France.

== Bourbon claim ==
His family, the "Bourbons of India", claim to be legitimate descendants of the House of Bourbon, descended from Jean Philippe de Bourbon, Count of Clermont-en-Beauvaisis, an exiled French noble who served in Mughal Emperor Akbar's court, and was allegedly the son of Charles III, Duke of Bourbon. The family is also known as "Bourbon-Bhopal", a name derived from the city of Bhopal in central India where their last few generations have resided and worked in the royal court of the princely Bhopal State. Balthazar Napoleon IV, the current head of the family, is a lawyer and a part-time farmer by profession. He is married to Elisha Pacheco and has three children: Frederick, Michelle, and Adrian. His mission is "to preserve for history the political, cultural and religious contribution of the Bourbons of India in the subcontinent and prevent this important contribution from being relegated to a footnote in history books."

In his historical novel, Le Rajah Bourbon, the publication of which spurred a renewed interest in this claim to the French throne, Prince Michael of Greece and Denmark claimed that Balthazar Napoleon IV is the eldest in line to the French throne, offering a speculative biography of Jean Philippe, also claiming Jean Philippe was the nephew of Henry IV. Prince Michael of Greece said he would be willing to organize a DNA test to verify de Bourbon's claim of kinship, "perhaps from a surviving lock of Bourbon hair". Balthazar Napoleon stated that he was ready to undergo the DNA test, but he said he wanted to know "if the original samples will be available for matching since there were frequent inter-marriages among European royal families."

On 22 May 2013, the Ambassador of France to India visited Bhopal and met with Balthazar of Bourbon at a function and in a statement declared, "It is extraordinary to have a Bourbon here today!" Balthazar Napoleon has reportedly stated he will not move to France, nor seek citizenship there.

== See also ==
- List of heirs to the French throne
