= Leopold Bucher =

Austrian painter

Léopold Bucher (1797 – after 1858) was an Austrian painter of historical scenes, portraits and miniatures.

== Life ==
Leopold Bucher, noted history painter in Vienna, was born 1797 in Schwechat, and was still alive in 1858. He exhibited at the Academy of Fine Arts in 1834, 1835, 1838 and 1850, after he had appeared in public in 1832 with the miniature painting „Die Cholera und das betende Österreich“.

== Works ==
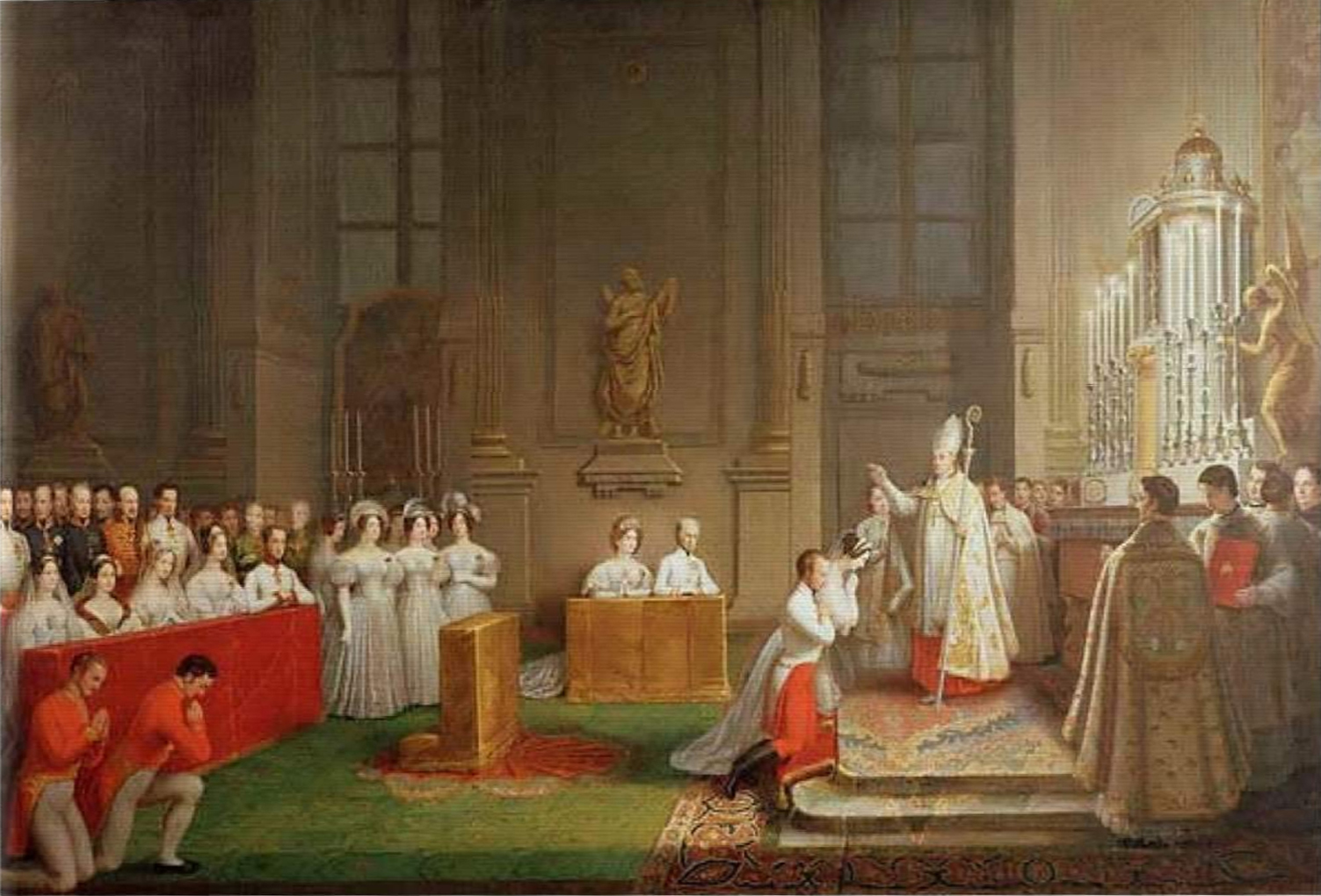
Marriage of Archduke Ferdinand with Princess Maria Anna of Savoy, 1831

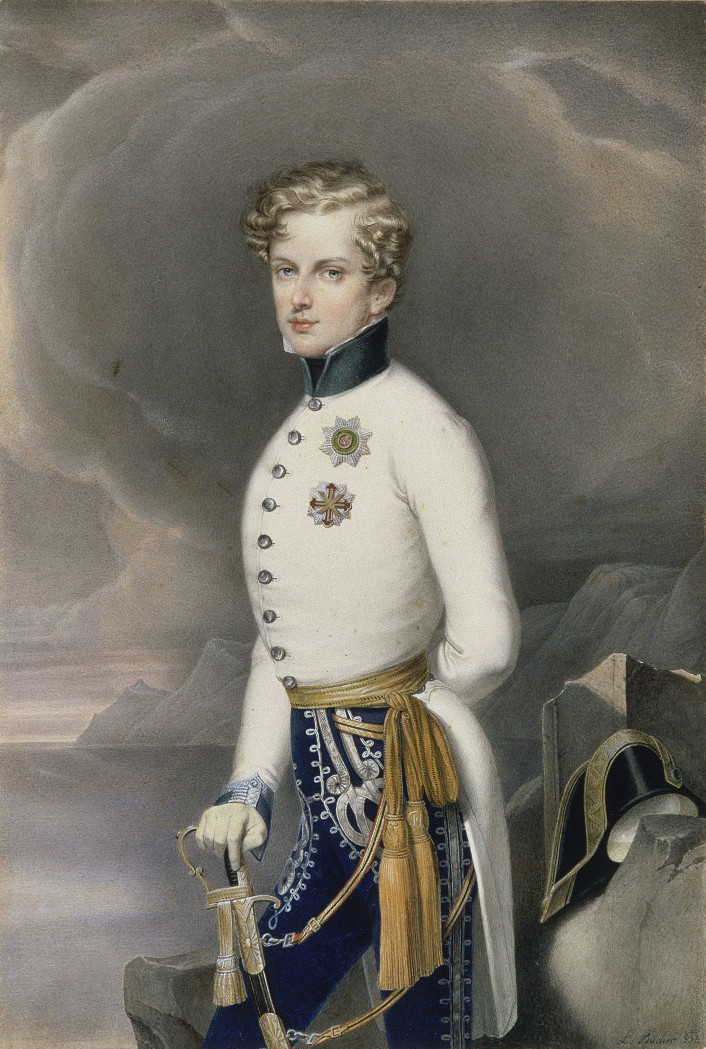
The Duke of Reichstadt, 1832

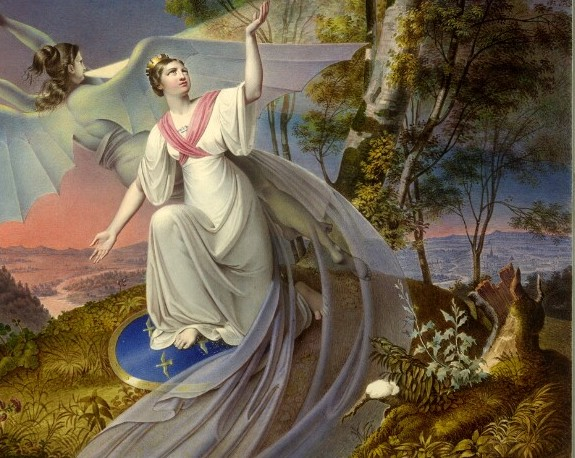
Austria and Cholera, 1832

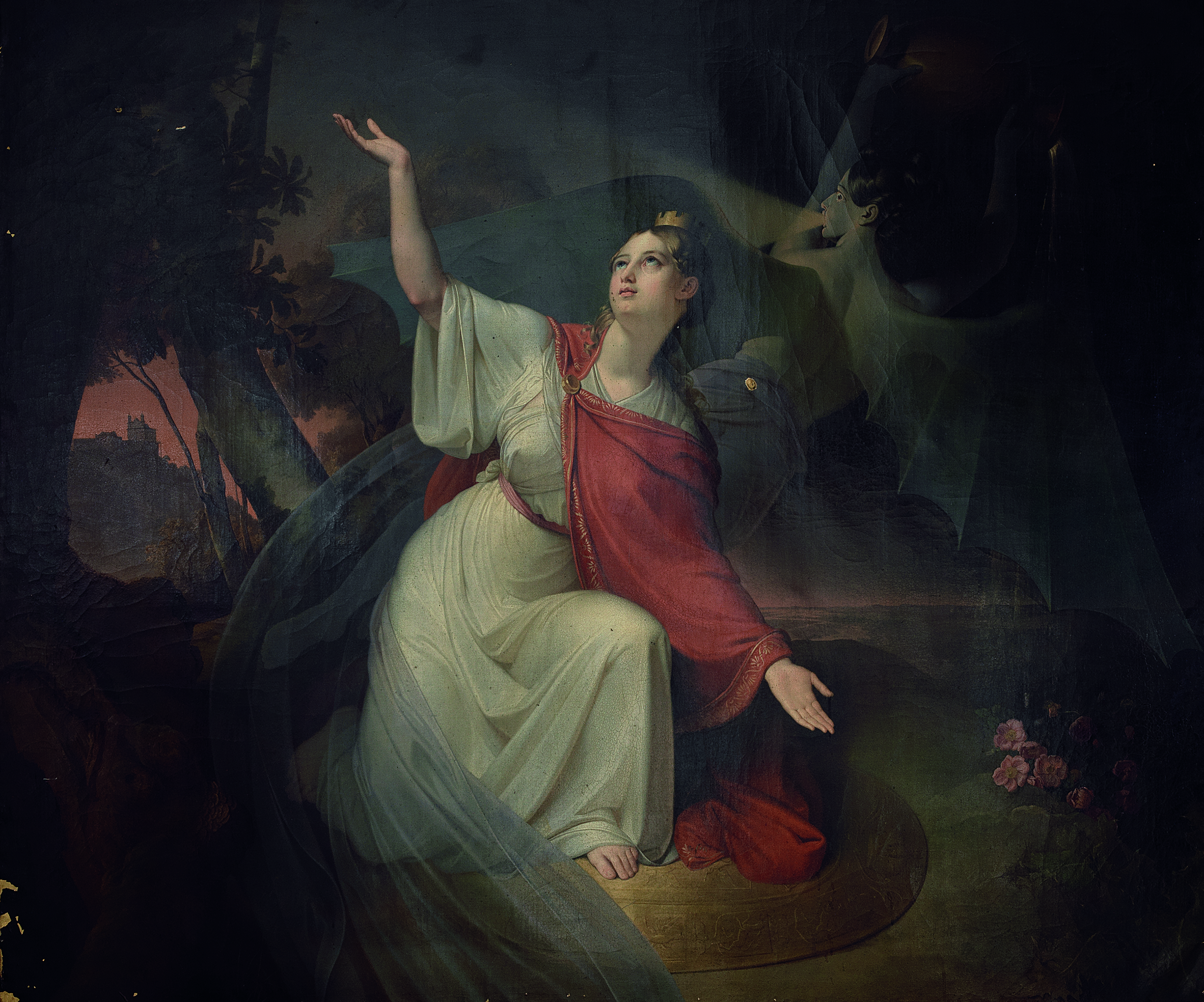
Austria and Cholera, 1835

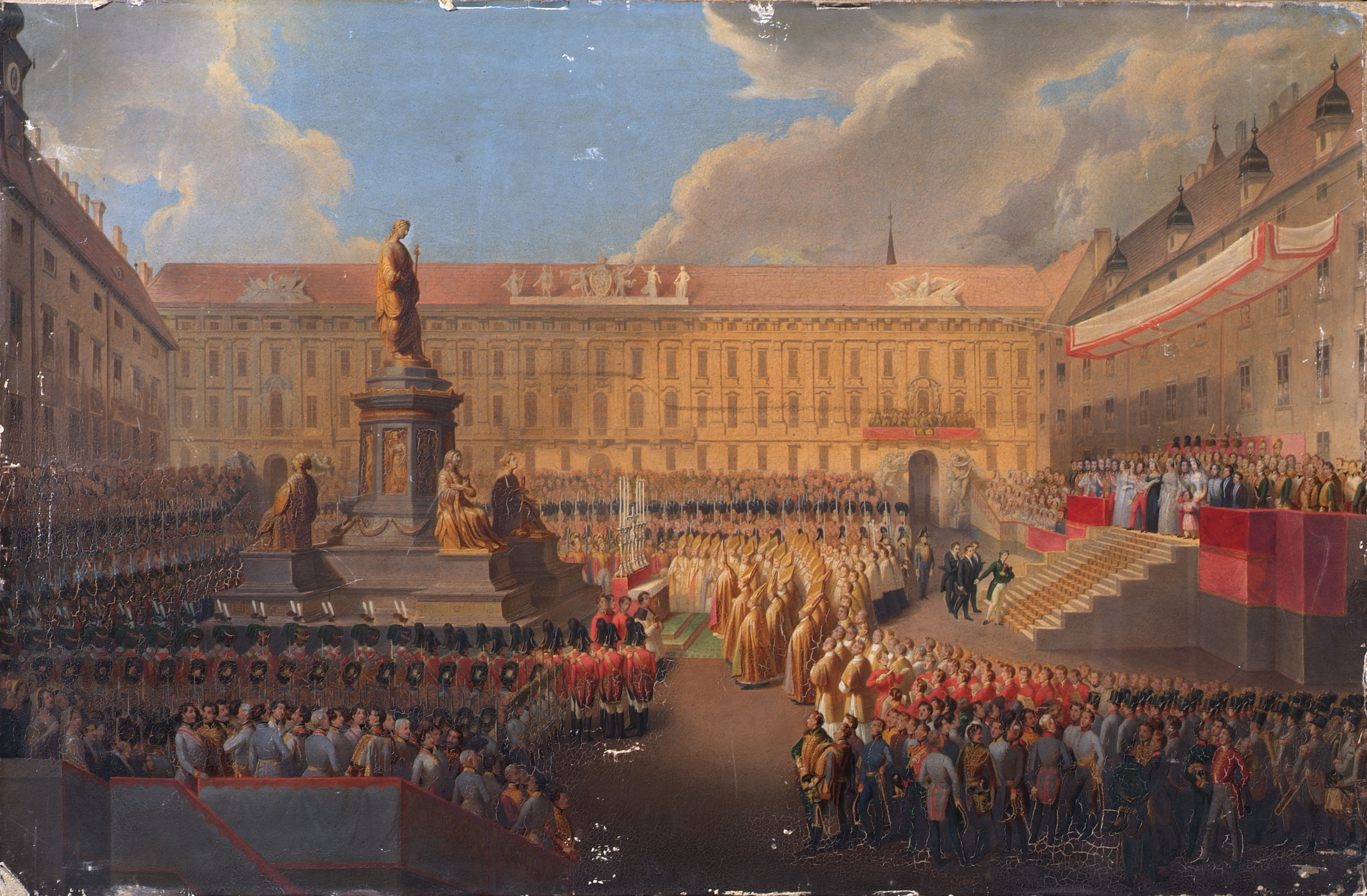
Unveiling of the monument to Emperor Franz I of Austria, 19 June 1846, on Vienna's Franzensplatz, c. 1846

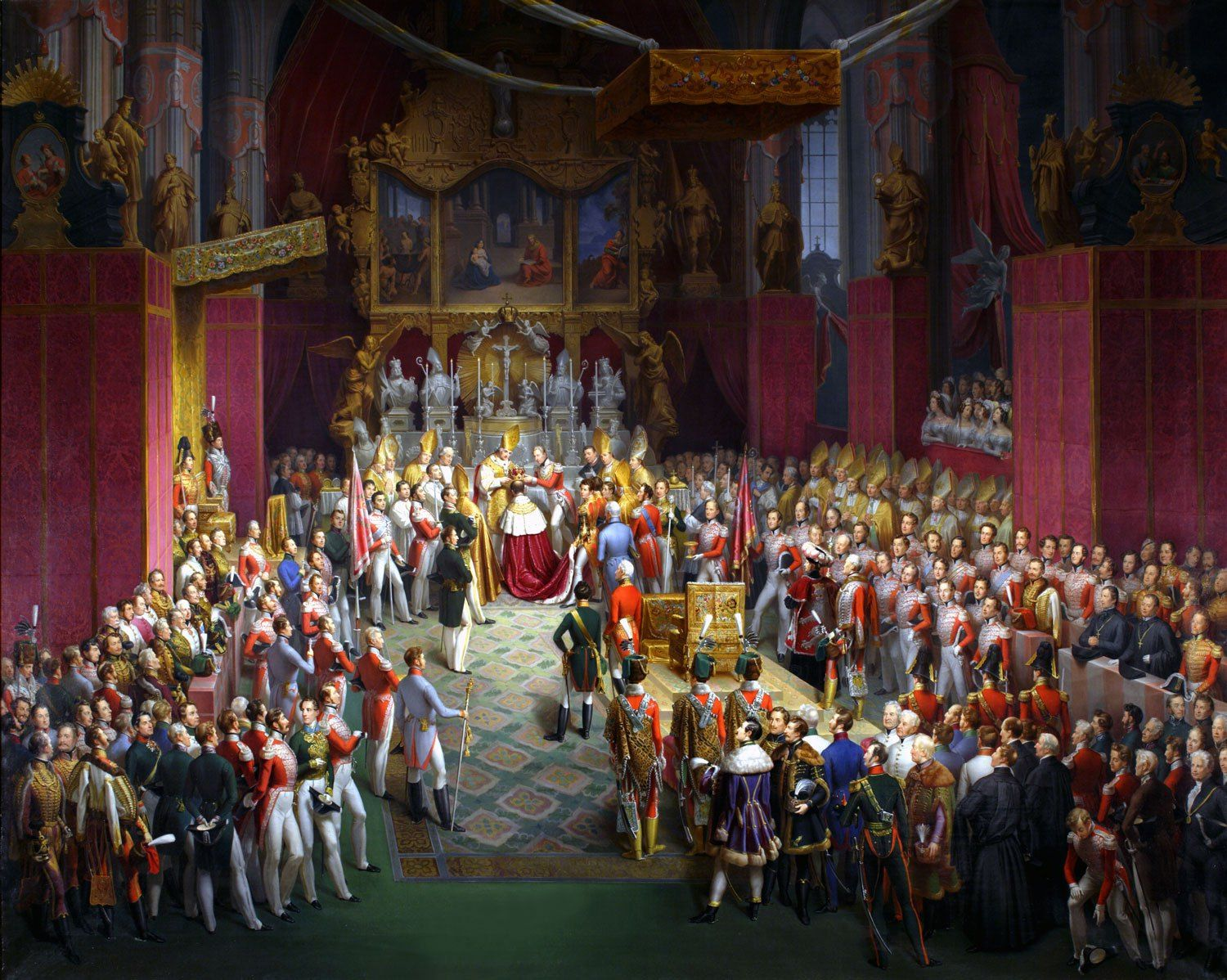
Coronation Ferdinand V of Bohemia, 1847

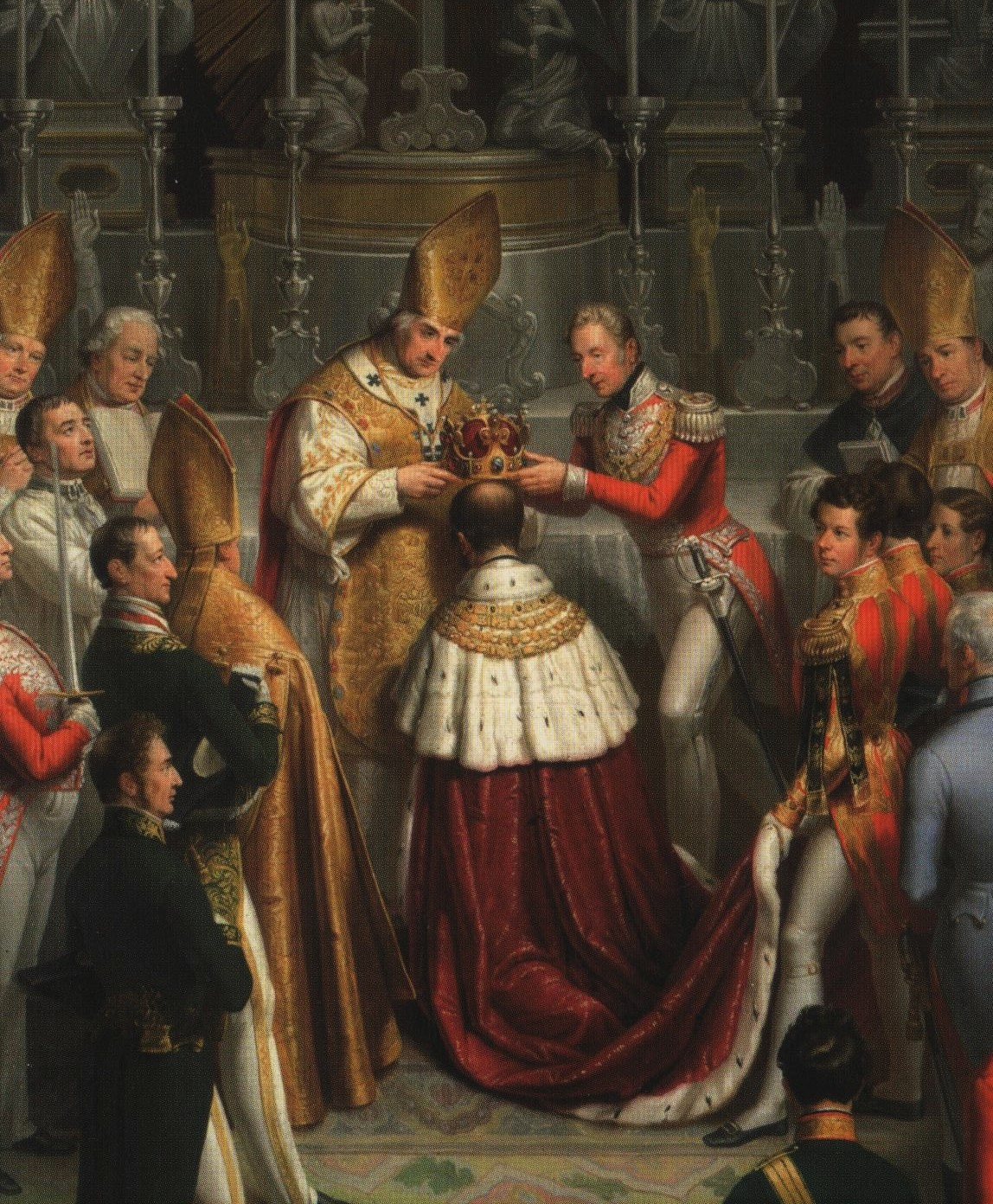
Coronation Ferdinand V (detail)

== Sources ==
- Trier, Dankmar (2021). "Bucher, Leopold". Allgemeines Künstlerlexikon Online (Online ed.). K. G. Saur; De Gruyter.
- Vollmer, Hans (1911). "Bucher, Leopold". In Thieme, Ulrich (ed.). Allgemeines Lexikon der Bildenden Künstler von der Antike bis zur Gegenwart. Vol. 5: Brewer–Carlingen. Leipzig: E. A. Seemann. p. 177.
- "Bucher, Léopold". Benezit Dictionary of Artists (Online ed.). Oxford University Press. 2011. doi:10.1093/benz/9780199773787.article.B00028269.
