= Louise Charlotte Françoise de Montesquiou =

French courtier (1765–1835)

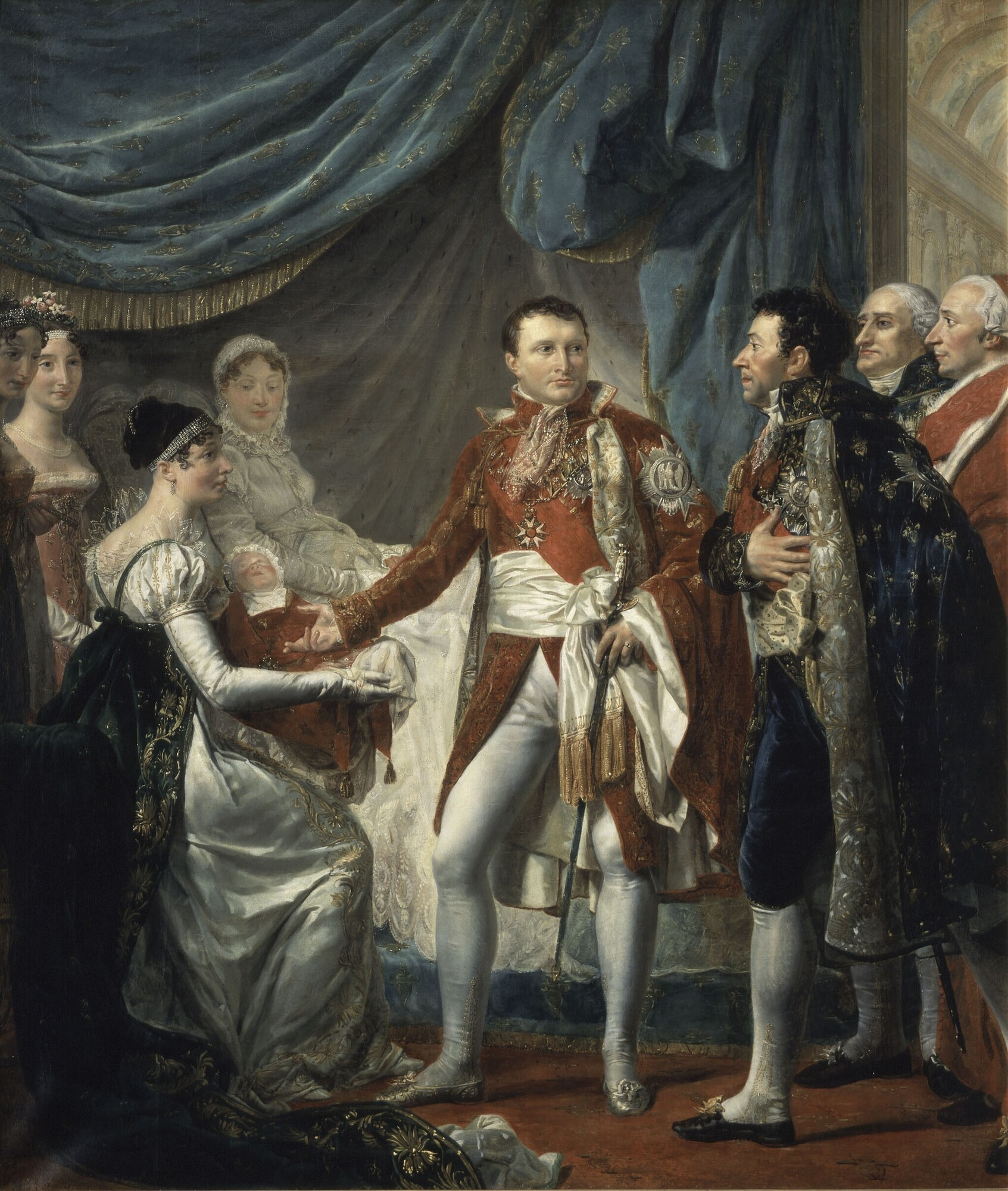
- Born: 25 June 1765; Château de Courtanvaux
- Died: 29 May 1835 (aged 69); Château de Courtanvaux
- Noble family: Le Tellier
- Spouse: Anne-Pierre de Montesquiou-Fézensac (m. 1780)
- Issue: Rodrigue Charles Eugène de Montesquiou-Fézensac; Anatole de Montesquiou-Fézensac; Alfred de Montesquiou; Elisabeth de Montesquiou-Fézensac; Augustin Marie Clodoald de Montesquiou-Fézensac

Louise Charlotte Françoise de Montesquiou, née de Le Tellier de Louvois-Courtanvaux de Montmirail de Creuzy (25 June 1765 – 29 May 1835), was a French courtier. She served as the royal governess of Napoleon II from 1811 until 1814. Louise was also a lady-in-waiting at the French court.

== Early life ==
Louise Charlotte Françoise de Montesquiou was born in the Château de Courtanvaux, she was the daughter of Charles François César Le Tellier de Louvois-Courtanvaux de Montmirail de Creuzy, Marquis de Montmirail (1734–1765) and his wife; Charlotte Bénigne le Ragois de Bretonvilliers.

=== Marriage ===
In 1780, she married Anne-Pierre de Montesquiou-Fézensac. Her spouse was first equerry to the Count of Provence before the French Revolution, and was appointed First Chamberlain to Emperor Napoleon in 1809. The marriage resulted in the birth of 5 children; Rodrigue Charles Eugène de Montesquiou-Fézensac (1782–1810), Anatole de Montesquiou-Fézensac (1788–1878), Elisabeth de Montesquiou-Fézensac (1791–Deceased), Alfred de Montesquiou (1794–1847) and Augustin Marie Clodoald de Montesquiou-Fézensac (1801–1820).

Louise was however appointed governess to the infant son of Napoleon and Marie Louise, the King of Rome, he would often nickname her the name “Maman Quiou.” Louise also accompanied him during his trip to Vienne, Isère after the abdication of his father.

=== Death ===
Louise later died in her childhood home; the Château de Courtanvaux, at the age of 69.
