= Napoleon II =

Son of Napoleon I (1811–1832)

- King of Rome; Duke of Reichstadt
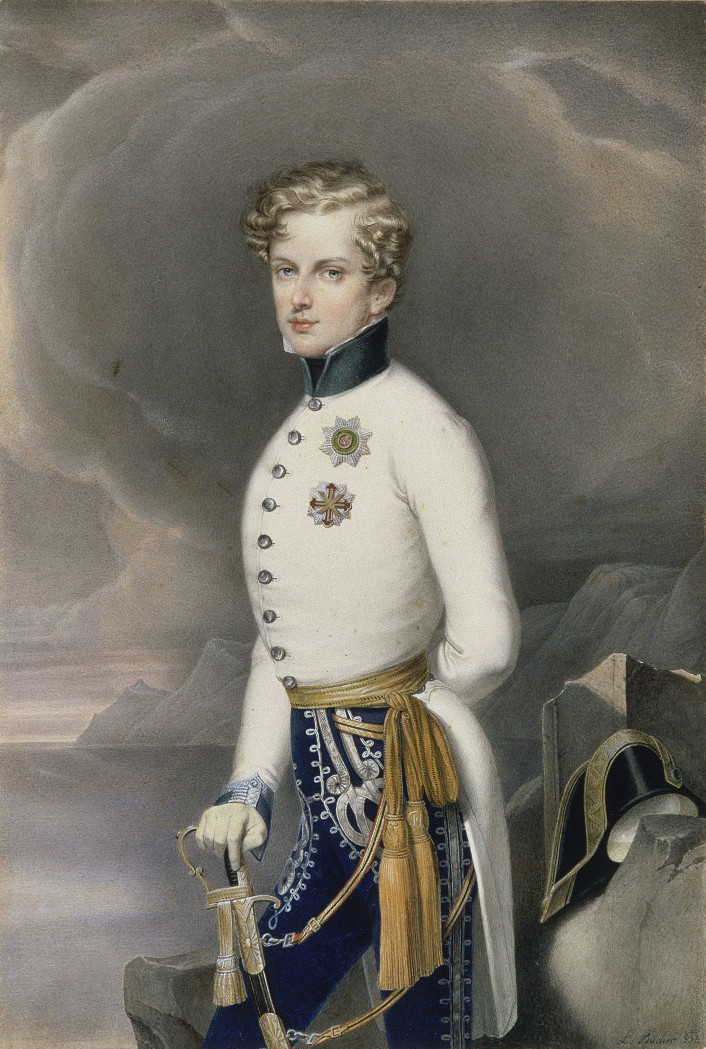
- Portrait by Leopold Bucher, 1832

Emperor of the French
- Reign: 22 June – 7 July 1815
- Predecessor: Napoleon I
- Successor: Napoleon III (1852, as Emperor); Louis XVIII (as King of France)
- Regent: Joseph Fouché

Head of the House of Bonaparte
- Tenure: 5 May 1821 – 22 July 1832
- Predecessor: Napoleon I
- Successor: Joseph Bonaparte
- Born: 20 March 1811; Tuileries Palace, Paris, France
- Died: 22 July 1832 (aged 21); Schönbrunn Palace, Vienna, Austria
- Burial: Napoleon's tomb, Les Invalides
Names
- French: Napoléon François Charles Joseph Bonaparte
- House: Bonaparte
- Father: Napoleon I
- Mother: Marie Louise, Duchess of Parma
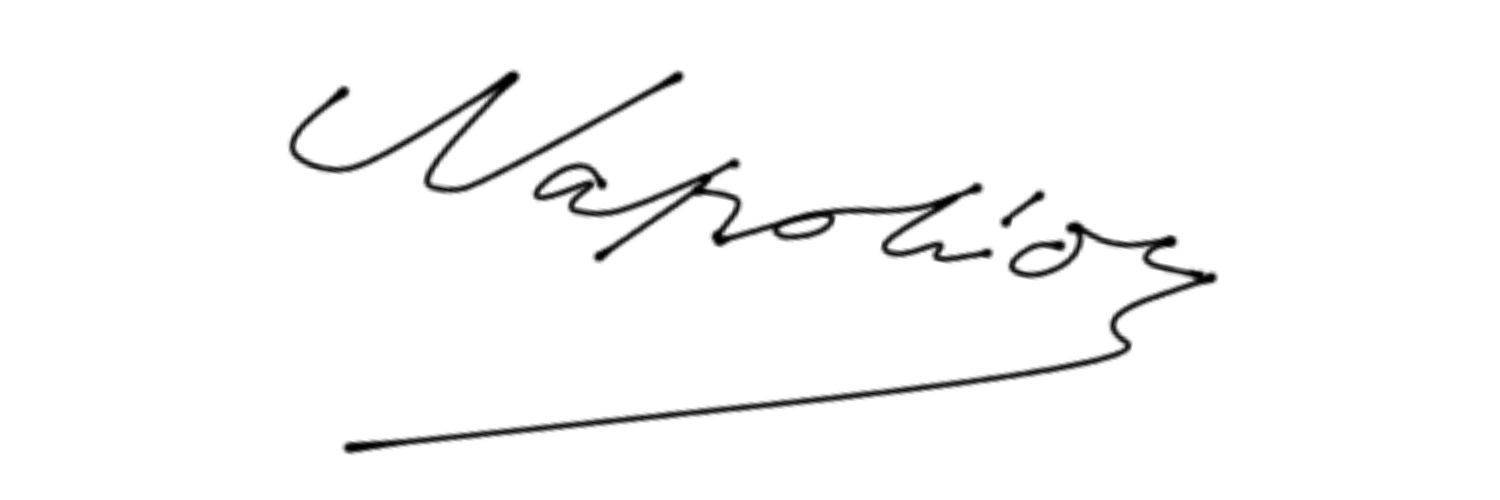
- Signature

Napoleon II (Napoléon François Charles Joseph Bonaparte; 20 March 1811 – 22 July 1832) was the disputed Emperor of the French for 2 weeks in 1815. He was the son of Emperor Napoleon I and Empress Marie Louise, daughter of Emperor Francis I of Austria.

Napoleon II had been Prince Imperial of France and King of Rome since birth. After the fall of his father, he lived the rest of his life in Vienna and was known in the Austrian court as Franz, Duke of Reichstadt for his adult life (from the German version of his second given name, along with a title his grandfather granted him in 1818). He was posthumously given the nickname L'Aiglon ("the Eaglet").

When Napoleon I tried to abdicate on 4 April 1814, he said that his son would rule as emperor. However, the coalition victors refused to acknowledge his son as successor, and Napoleon I was forced to abdicate unconditionally some days later. Although Napoleon II never actually ruled France, he was briefly the titular Emperor of the French after the second fall of his father. He died of tuberculosis at the age of 21.

His cousin, Louis-Napoléon Bonaparte, founded the Second French Empire in 1852 and ruled as Emperor Napoleon III. He was also the maternal great-great-grandson of Empress Maria Theresa, Empress of Habsburg Dominions and Francis I, Holy Roman Emperor and great-grandson of Maria Carolina of Austria, Queen of Naples and Sicily.

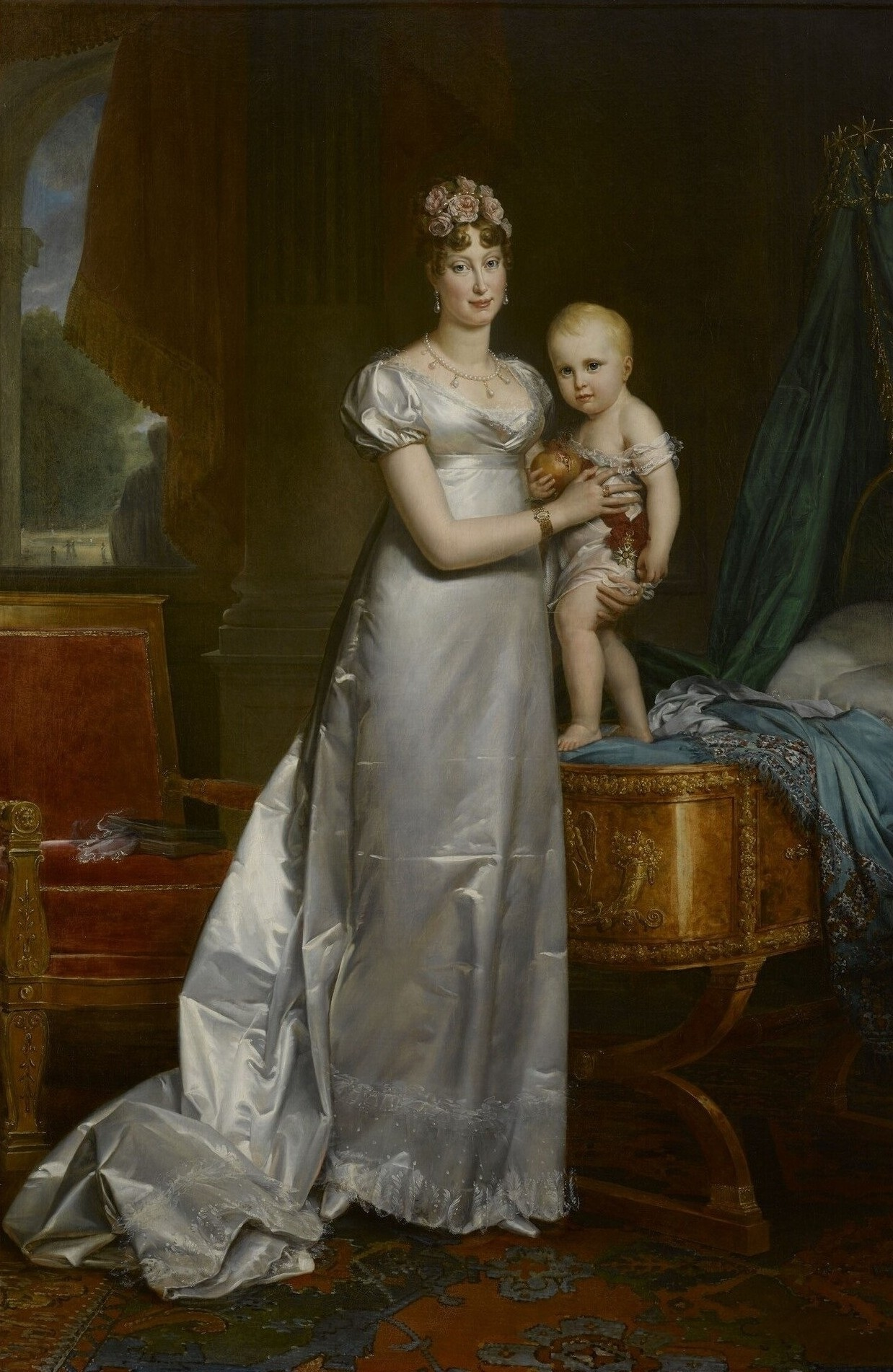
Empress Marie Louise and her son Napoleon, King of Rome, by François Gérard, 1813

== Early life ==
Napoleon II was born on 20 March 1811, at the Tuileries Palace, the son of Emperor Napoleon I and Empress Marie Louise. On the same day he underwent ondoiement (a traditional French ceremony which is a simple baptism unaccompanied by the usual additional ceremonies) by Joseph Fesch with his full name of Napoleon François Charles Joseph. The baptism, inspired by the baptismal ceremony of Louis Joseph, Dauphin of France, was held on 9 June 1811 inside of Notre Dame de Paris. Karl Philipp, Prince of Schwarzenberg, Austrian ambassador to France, wrote of the baptism:

The baptism ceremony was beautiful and impressive; the scene in which the emperor took the infant from the arms of his noble mother and raised him up twice to reveal him to the public [thus breaking from long tradition, as he did when he crowned himself at his coronation] was loudly applauded; in the monarch's manner and face could be seen the great satisfaction that he took from this solemn moment.

He was put in the care of Louise Charlotte Françoise de Montesquiou, a descendant of François-Michel le Tellier, Marquis de Louvois, who was named Governess of the Children of France. Affectionate and intelligent, the governess assembled a considerable collection of books intended to give the infant a strong grounding in religion, philosophy, and military matters.

=== Succession rights ===
As the only legitimate son of Napoleon I, he was already constitutionally the Prince Imperial and heir apparent, but the Emperor also gave his son the title of King of Rome. Three years later, the First French Empire collapsed. Napoleon I saw his second wife and their son for the last time on 24 January 1814. On 4 April 1814, he abdicated in favour of his three-year-old son after the Six Days' Campaign and the Battle of Paris. The child became Emperor of the French under the regnal name of Napoleon II. However, on 6 April 1814, Napoleon I fully abdicated and renounced not only his own rights to the French throne, but also those of his descendants. The Treaty of Fontainebleau in 1814 gave the child the right to use the title of Prince of Parma, of Piacenza, and of Guastalla, and his mother was styled the Duchess of Parma, of Piacenza, and of Guastalla.

== Reign ==
On 29 March 1814, Marie Louise, accompanied by her entourage, left the Tuileries Palace with her son. Their first stop was the Château de Rambouillet; then, fearing the advancing enemy troops, they continued on to the Château de Blois. On 13 April, with her entourage much diminished, Marie Louise and her three-year-old son were back in Rambouillet, where they met her father, Emperor Francis I of Austria, and Emperor Alexander I of Russia. On 23 April, escorted by an Austrian regiment, mother and son left Rambouillet and France forever, for their exile in Austria.

In 1815, after his resurgence and then his defeat at Waterloo, Napoleon I abdicated for the second time in favour of his four-year-old son, whom he had not seen since his exile to Elba. The day after Napoleon's abdication, a Commission of Government of five members took the rule of France, pending the return to Paris of the Bourbon King Louis XVIII, who was still in Le Cateau-Cambrésis. The Commission held power for two weeks, but never formally summoned Napoleon II as Emperor or appointed a regent. The entrance of the Allies into Paris on 7 July brought a rapid end to the hopes of supporters of the young Napoleon: instead, he remained in Austria with his mother.

The next Bonaparte to ascend a French imperial throne, in 1852, would be Louis-Napoleon, who took the regnal name Napoleon III. He was the son of Napoleon's brother Louis Bonaparte, who had been King of Holland from 1806 to 1810.

== Life in Austria ==
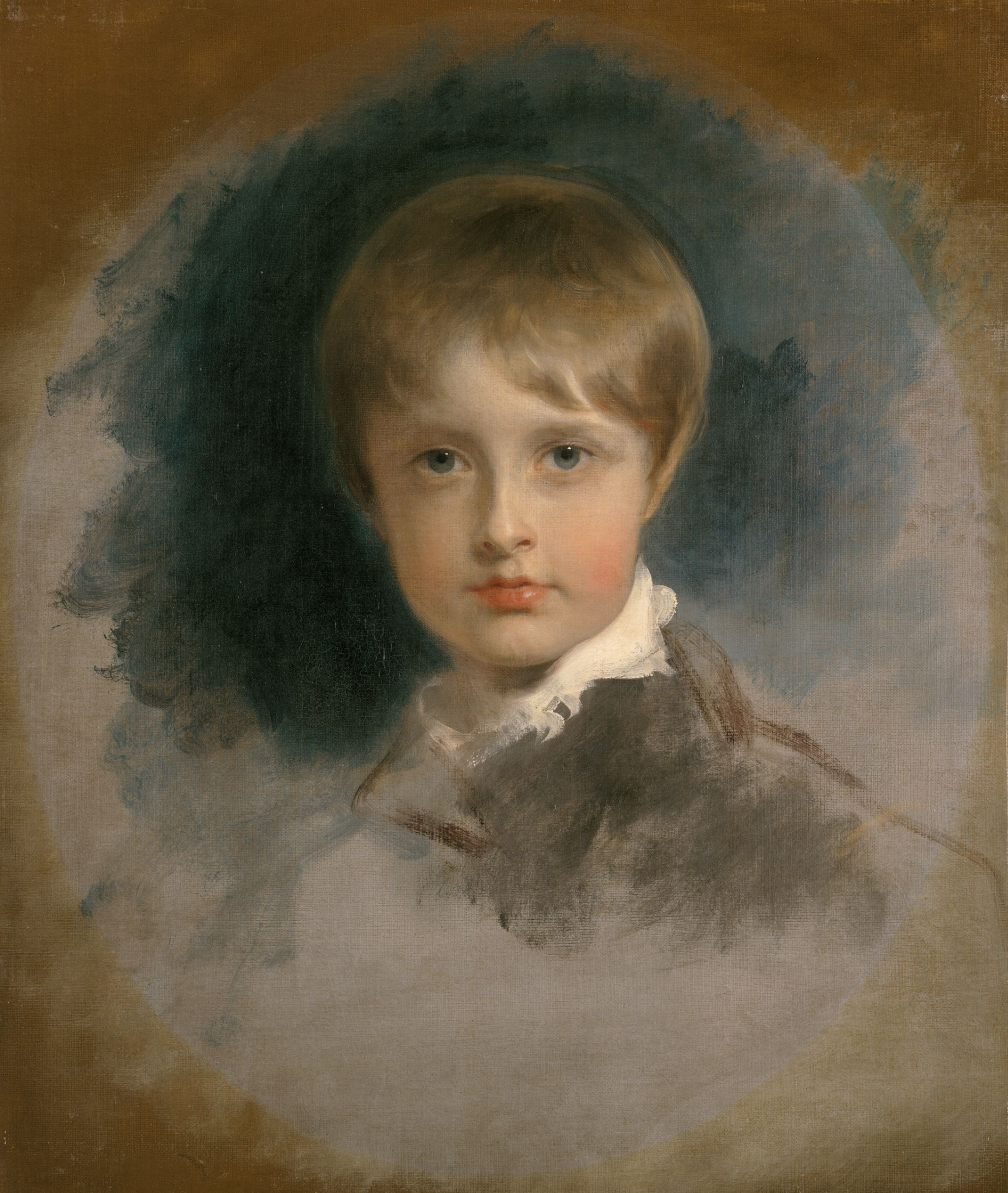
Portrait of Napoleon II by Thomas Lawrence, 1819

From the spring of 1814 onwards, the young Napoleon lived in Austria and was known as "Franz", a German language cognate of his second given name, François. In 1818, he was awarded the title of Duke of Reichstadt by his maternal grandfather, Emperor Francis.

By 1820, Franz had completed his elementary studies and begun his military training, learning German, Italian and mathematics as well as receiving advanced physical training. His official army career began at age 12, in 1823, when he was made a cadet in the Austrian Army. Accounts from his tutors describe Franz as intelligent, serious, and focused. Additionally, he was very tall, having grown to nearly 1.8 m (6 ft) by the time he was 17.

His budding military career raised concerns and sparked fascination among European monarchies and French leaders about his possible return to France. However, he was allowed to play no political role and instead was used by Austrian Chancellor Klemens von Metternich in bargaining with France to gain advantage for Austria. Fearful of anyone in the Bonaparte family regaining political power, Metternich even rejected a request for Franz to move to a warmer climate in Italy. He received another rejection when his grandfather refused to allow him to join the army traveling to Italy to put down a rebellion.

Upon the death of his stepfather, Adam Albert von Neipperg, and the revelation that his mother had borne two illegitimate children to Neipperg prior to their marriage, Franz grew distant from his mother and felt that his Austrian family were holding him back to avoid political controversy. He said to his friend, Anton von Prokesch-Osten, "If Joséphine had been my mother, my father would not have been buried at Saint Helena, and I should not be at Vienna. My mother is kind but weak; she was not the wife my father deserved".

== Death ==
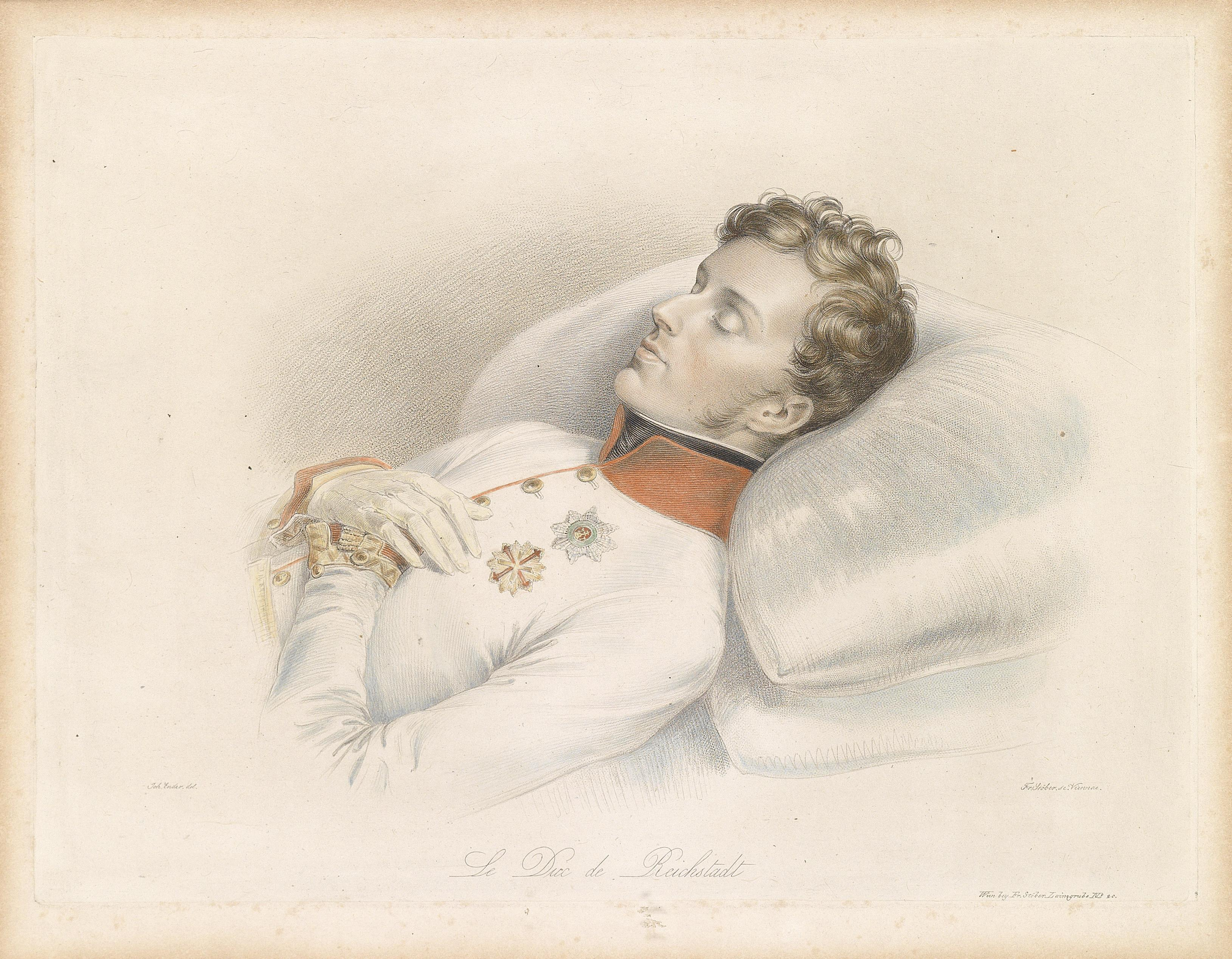
Deathbed portrait, engraved by Franz Xaver Stöber

In 1831, Franz was given command of an Austrian battalion, but he never got the chance to serve in any meaningful capacity. In 1832, he caught pneumonia and was bedridden for several months. His poor health eventually overtook him and on 22 July 1832 Franz died of tuberculosis at Schönbrunn Palace in Vienna. Toward the end of his life, Franz is reported to have said, "My birth and my death will be the only point of remembrance."

=== Disposition of his remains ===
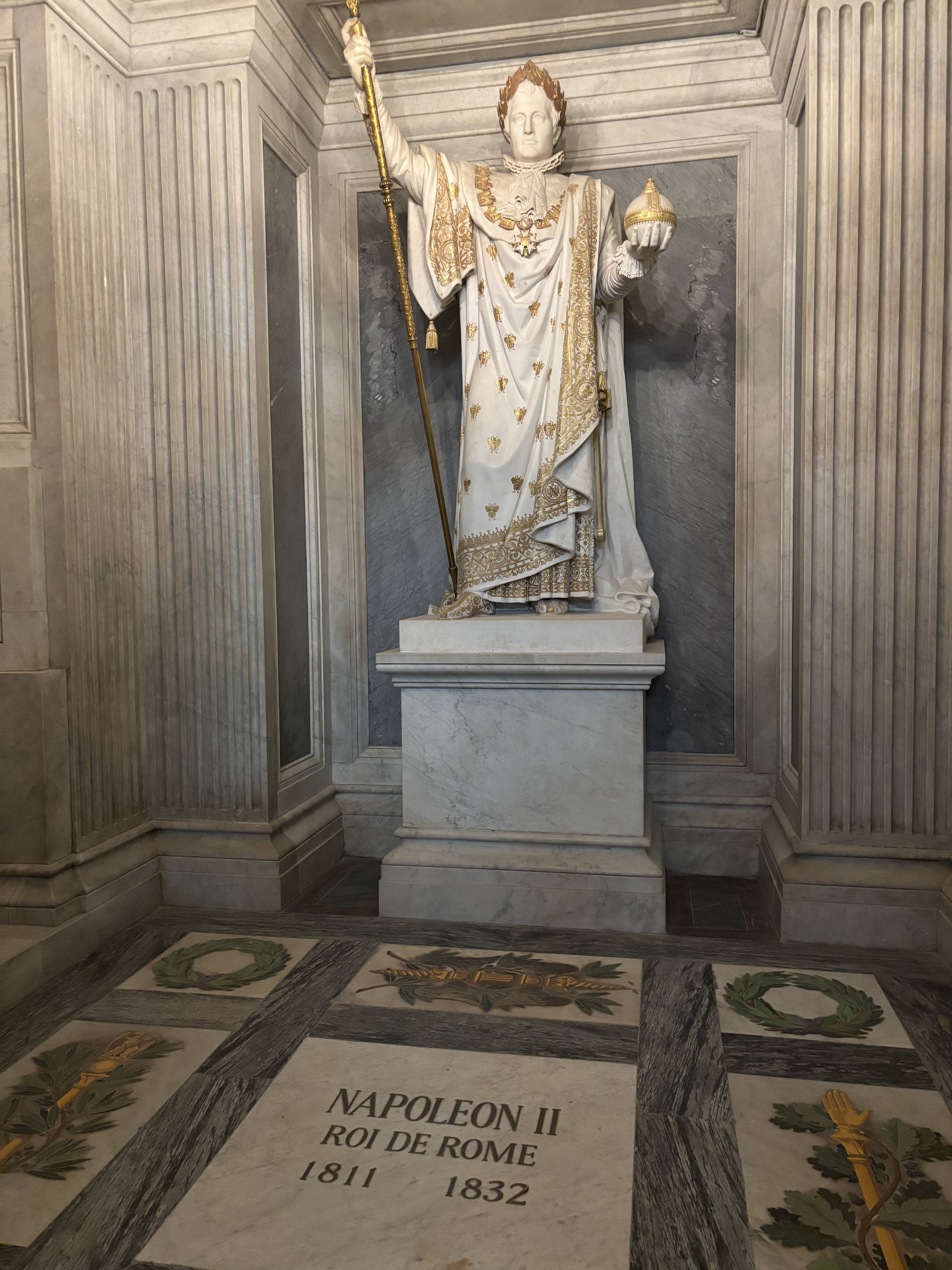
Tomb of Napoleon II at Les Invalides, Paris

On 15 December 1940, Adolf Hitler ordered the remains of Napoleon II to be transferred from the Imperial Crypt in Vienna to the dome of Les Invalides in Paris. The remains of Napoleon I had been returned to France in December 1840, at the time of the July Monarchy.

While most of his remains were transferred to Paris in 1940, his heart and intestines remained in Vienna, which is traditional for members of the Habsburg family. His heart is in Urn 42 of the Herzgruft ('Heart Crypt').

== Legacy ==
- In 1900, Edmond Rostand wrote a play, L'Aiglon, about his life.
- Serbian composer Petar Stojanović composed the operetta Napoleon II: Herzog von Reichstadt, which premiered in Vienna in the 1920s.
- Victor Tourjansky directed a French-language film titled L'Aiglon in 1931, and he also directed a separate German-language version.
- Arthur Honegger and Jacques Ibert collaborated on an opera, L'Aiglon, which premiered in 1937.
- The journalist Henri Rochefort joked that Napoleon II, having never really governed, was France's best leader, since he brought no war, taxes or tyranny.

He was noted for his friendship with Sophie, a Bavarian princess of the House of Wittelsbach. Intelligent, ambitious and strong-willed, Sophie had little in common with her husband Franz Karl, the brother of Napoleon II's mother, Empress Marie Louise. There were rumors of a love affair between Sophie and Napoleon II, as well as gossip that Sophie's second son, Maximilian I of Mexico, born in 1832, was the result of the affair.

== Honours ==
- Austrian Empire: Knight Grand Cross of the Order of Saint Stephen, 1811
- First French Empire: Grand Eagle of the Legion of Honour
- Kingdom of Italy: Knight of the Order of the Iron Crown, 1st Class
- Duchy of Parma: Knight Grand Cross of the Sacred Military Constantinian Order of Saint George

=== Coats of arms ===
King of Rome
(1811–14)

Emperor of the French (titular ruler)

Duke of Reichstadt (1818–32)

== See also ==
- Cradle of the King of Rome
- Palace of the King of Rome

== Sources ==
- Castelot, André. Napoleon's Son (Hamish Hamilton, 1960)
- Oddie, E. M., Napoleon II: King of Rome (Sampson Low, Marston & Co., 1925)
- Palmer, Alan (1994). Twilight of the Habsburgs: The Life and Times of Emperor Francis Joseph. New York: Atlantic Monthly Press. ISBN 0-87113-665-1.
- Welschinger, Le roi de Rome, 1811–32, (Paris, 1897)
- Wertheimer, The Duke of Reichstadt, (London, 1905)

Napoleon II House of Bonaparte Born: 20 March 1811 Died: 22 July 1832
Regnal titles
Preceded by Napoleon I	— DISPUTED — Emperor of the French; 22 June – 7 July 1815	Bourbon Restoration
Titles in pretence
Loss of title Bourbon Restoration	— TITULAR — Emperor of the French; 5 May 1821 – 22 July 1832	Succeeded by Joseph I
