= Monsieur d'Orléans =

- Duke of Orleans
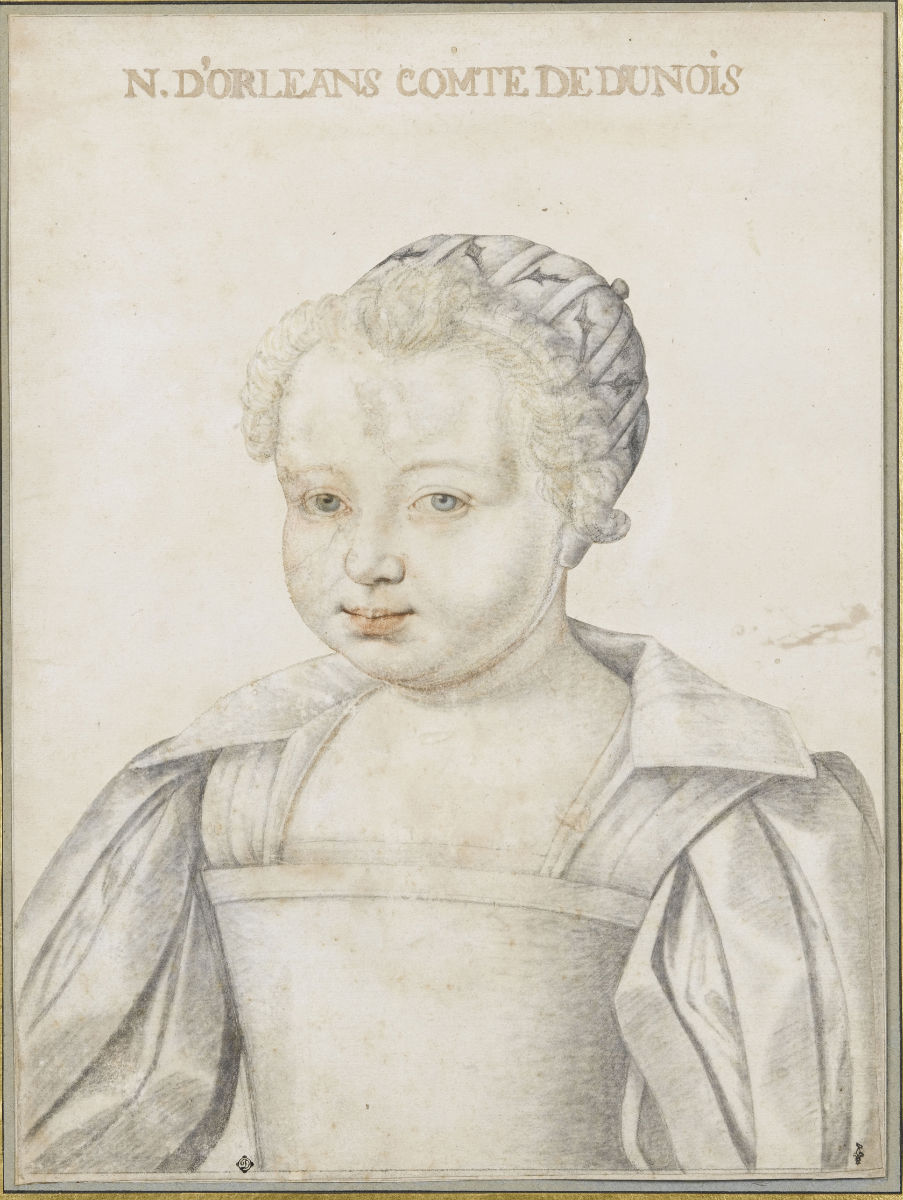
- An undated sketch of Monsieur d'Orléans.
- Born: 16 April 1607; Château de Fontainebleau
- Died: 17 November 1611 (aged 4); Château de Saint-Germain-en-Laye
- Burial: 25 November 1611; Basilica of Saint-Denis
- House: Bourbon
- Father: Henry IV of France
- Mother: Marie de' Medici

Monsieur d'Orléans (16 April 1607 – 17 November 1611) was the second son and fourth child of Henry IV of France and his consort, Marie de' Medici. Commonly ascribed the names Nicolas or Nicolas Henri and the title Duke of Orléans, he was neither baptised nor invested as such during the course of his short life.

He was betrothed to Marie de Bourbon-Montpensier, heiress to vast lands of the extended House of Bourbon. After his father's death in 1610, he was heir presumptive to his older brother, Louis XIII. Of frail health, he died of seizures brought on by hydrocephalus at the age of four, whereupon his title and betrothal were transferred to Gaston, his younger brother.

== Biography ==
=== Birth and name ===
Marie de' Medici gave birth to her fourth child, a son, at the Palace of Fontainebleau. Like all of her other children, he was born in the Oval room, later called the "Louis XIII salon". Born at 22:00 on 16 April 1607, the day after Easter, the prince's birth was a source of tremendous joy for his father, King Henry. His newborn son was said to resemble him, possessing the same large nose and "sparkle of his father's eyes".

At his birth, Henry bestowed upon his son 10,000 Lt in land revenue, adding that he would be granted an annuity provided that he should serve his brother, the Dauphin, well. As it had become customary for the second son of the king to receive the title of Duke of Orléans, news of the young prince's birth described him as "Monsieur d'Orléans". Henry expressed no desire for this to be retracted, but specified that his son will only be styled as such, not invested.

Monsieur d'Orléans, as he was henceforth known, was never invested as Duke of Orléans and never baptised; thus, he was never given a name. It was not uncommon in the French royal family for children to be baptised when they were much older: the Dauphin himself had only been baptised in September 1606, when he was almost 5. This lack of a name is also evidenced by his death register, which only records him as "Monseigneur le duc d'Orléans". He was similarly referred to by his doctor during his final illness, where no name was mentioned.

In his genealogy of French royalty, Père Anselme refers to Monsieur d'Orléans as "N... de France, duc d'Orléans". While "N..." initially meant "unnamed" (French: non-nommé), it has since been erroneously transcribed as Nicolas. This error, though noted by numerous historians, including Georges Lacour-Gayet, Eudore Soulié and Édouard de Barthélemy, seems to have been repeated by means of biographers copying the child's supposed name from other biographers.

=== Life ===
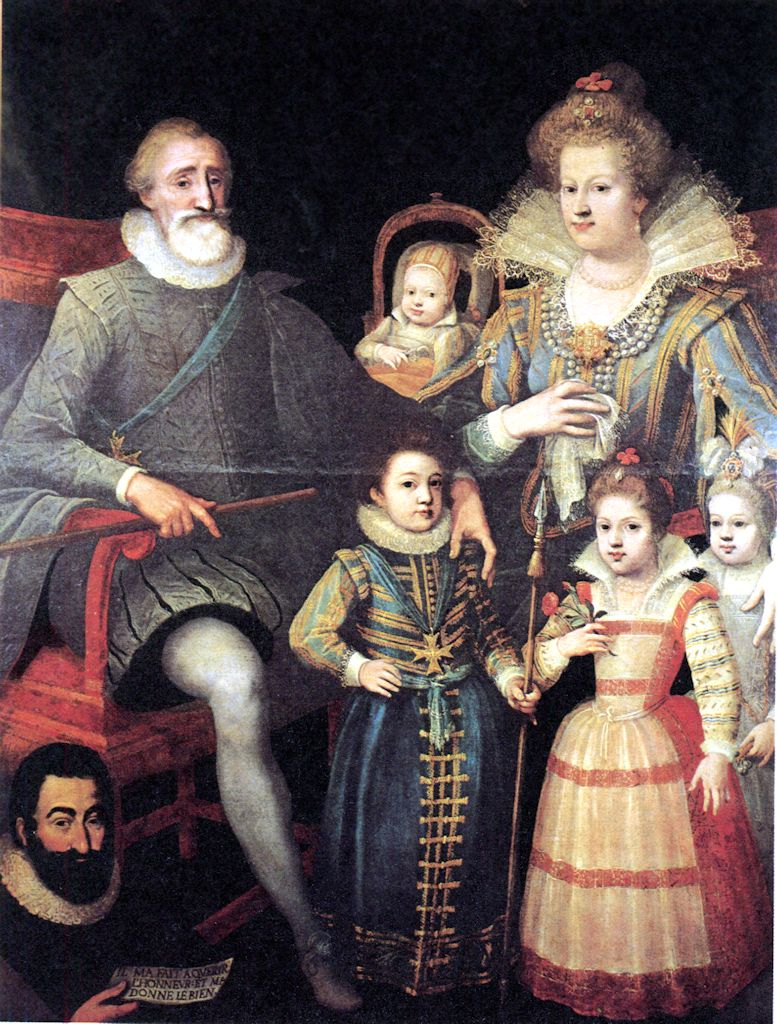
Henry IV and his family, around 1607, attributed Frans Pourbus the Younger. Monsieur d'Orléans is depicted in a cradle behind his parents.

The playwright François Tristan l'Hermite, who, as a youngster, lived at the court of Henry IV and was often called upon to read stories to the king's own children, described Monsieur d'Orléans as extremely handsome, intelligent, sharp-witted and prone to taking pity on those around him. Once, when recounting Aesop's The Wolf and the Lamb to Monsieur, the young prince was disturbed at the thought of the wolf eating the lamb, and implored l'Hermite to stop. This touched all those present, prompting l'Hermite to change the ending of the fable. Deeply moved, l'Hermite would later describe Monsieur d'Orléans as "a divine flower" and "an incomparable wonder".

In 1608, Monsieur's father, Henry IV, intended to betroth him to the slightly older Marie de Bourbon-Montpensier, who was one of the greatest heiresses of her time, having inherited numerous titles and lands on the death of her father, Henri, Duke of Montpensier. Her mother, Henriette Catherine de Joyeuse, herself a rich heiress, held a high position at court as the recently widowed and wealthy mother of a princesse du sang. In 1610, Henry IV was stabbed to death by a Catholic fanatic in Paris and the Dauphin succeeded as Louis XIII, with Queen Marie as regent. As the second son, Monsieur became heir presumptive to the French throne, a position he held until his death.

=== Health and death ===
Monsieur's health was delicate from infancy. In September 1607, one of his nursemaids died of the plague; soon afterwards, he was discovered to be feverish, but seemed to have recovered quickly. Louis Batiffol, Marie de' Medici's biographer, describes Monsieur as frail, with a large head and a very thin body, stating that he "suffered from his first days" and "dragged on in constant suffering".

In November 1611, Monsieur was taken ill with seizures at the Château de Saint-Germain-en-Laye, which lasted a few days. Louis XIII was brought to visit his brother and, upon seeing him, Monsieur reportedly said: "you honour me too greatly to have come to see me". The young king ran out of the room in tears and refused to enter again. Some time in the next days, Monsieur reported that a white angel had visited him and told him that his father wished to see him. After a series of seizures, he died between midnight and 1:00 on the morning of 17 November. The following day, the body of Monsieur d'Orléans was subjected to an autopsy, which revealed that his brain was of a soft consistency, filled with water and pus. The liquid present in his brain was judged to be the cause of his seizures. He was, otherwise, in perfect physical health.

After the autopsy, Monsieur's body was sent to the Basilica of Saint-Denis, where it lay in state until 25 November, when he was buried there. After his death, the duchy of Orléans was awarded to his younger brother, Gaston. In order to honour the terms of the betrothal, Marie de Bourbon-Montpensier herself was eventually married to Gaston, the new Duke of Orléans.

== Titles and styles ==
Although never formally invested as such, Monsieur d'Orléans was styled as duc d'Orléans and had the distinction of being a fils de France (son of France).

== Ancestry ==
Ancestors of Monsieur d'Orléans

8. Charles, Duke of Vendôme
4. Antoine of Navarre
9. Françoise of Alençon
2. Henry IV of France
10. Henry II of Navarre
5. Jeanne III of Navarre
11. Marguerite of Angoulême
1. Nicolas Henri of France
12. Cosimo I de' Medici, Grand Duke of Tuscany
6. Francesco I de' Medici, Grand Duke of Tuscany
13. Eleanor of Toledo
3. Marie de' Medici
14. Ferdinand I, Holy Roman Emperor
7. Joanna of Austria
15. Anne of Bohemia and Hungary

== Bibliography ==
- Anselme de Sainte-Marie (1712). Histoire généalogique et chronologique de la maison royale de France (in French). Vol. 1. Paris: M. Guignard & C. Robustel.
- Batiffol, Louis (1931). La vie intime d'une reine de France au xviie siècle : Marie de Médicis (in French). Paris: Calmann-Lévy.
- Carmona, Michel (1981). Marie de Médicis (in French). Paris: La Grand livre du mois. ISBN 2-7028-6727-8.
- Delorme, Philippe (1998). Marie de Médicis (in French). Paris: Éditions Pygmalion. ISBN 2-85704-553-0.
- Duerloo, Luc (2012). Dynasty and Piety: Archduke Albert (1598-1621) and Habsburg Political. Routledge.
- l'Hermite, Tristan François (1898). Le page disgracié (in French). Paris: Éditions Plon.
- Héroard, Jean (1989). Journal de Jean Héroard, médecin de Louis XIII (in French). Paris: Fayard. ISBN 2-21302-349-2.
- Lacour-Gayet, Georges (1898). Revue critique d'histoire et de littérature (in French). Paris.
- Le Maistre, Rodolphe (1616). La Santé du Prince ou le soing qu'on y doibt observer (in French). Paris.
- L'Estoile, Pierre (1761). Journal du règne de Henri IV roi de France et de Navarre (in French). Vol. 3. Paris: La Haye.
- de Malherbe, François (1862). Œuvres de Malherbe: Préface (in French). Paris: L. Hachette et cie.
- de Montjouvent, Philippe (1999). Éphéméride de la Maison de France de 1589 à 1848 : Henri IV et ses descendants (in French). Charenton: Éditions du Chaney. ISBN 2-913211-01-1.
- Soulié, Eudore; de Barthélemy, Édouard (1868). Journal de Jean Héroard sur l'enfance et la jeunesse de Louis XIII (in French). Paris.
- Spangler, Jonathan W.; Richards, Penny; Munns, Jessica, eds. (2015). Aspiration, Representation and Memory: The Guise in Europe, 1506–1688. Farnham, Surrey: Ashgate Publishing. ISBN 978-1-4724-1934-7.

Monsieur d'Orléans House of Bourbon Cadet branch of the Capetian dynasty Born: 16 April 1607 Died: 17 November 1611
French royalty
Preceded by First	Heir to the Throne as Heir presumptive 14 May 1610 — 17 November 1611	Succeeded by Gaston, Duke of Anjou
French nobility
Vacant Title last held by Alexandre Édouard de Valois	Duke of Orléans; 1607–1611	Succeeded by Gaston de France
