= Portrait of Napoleon II =

1819 painting by Thomas Lawrence

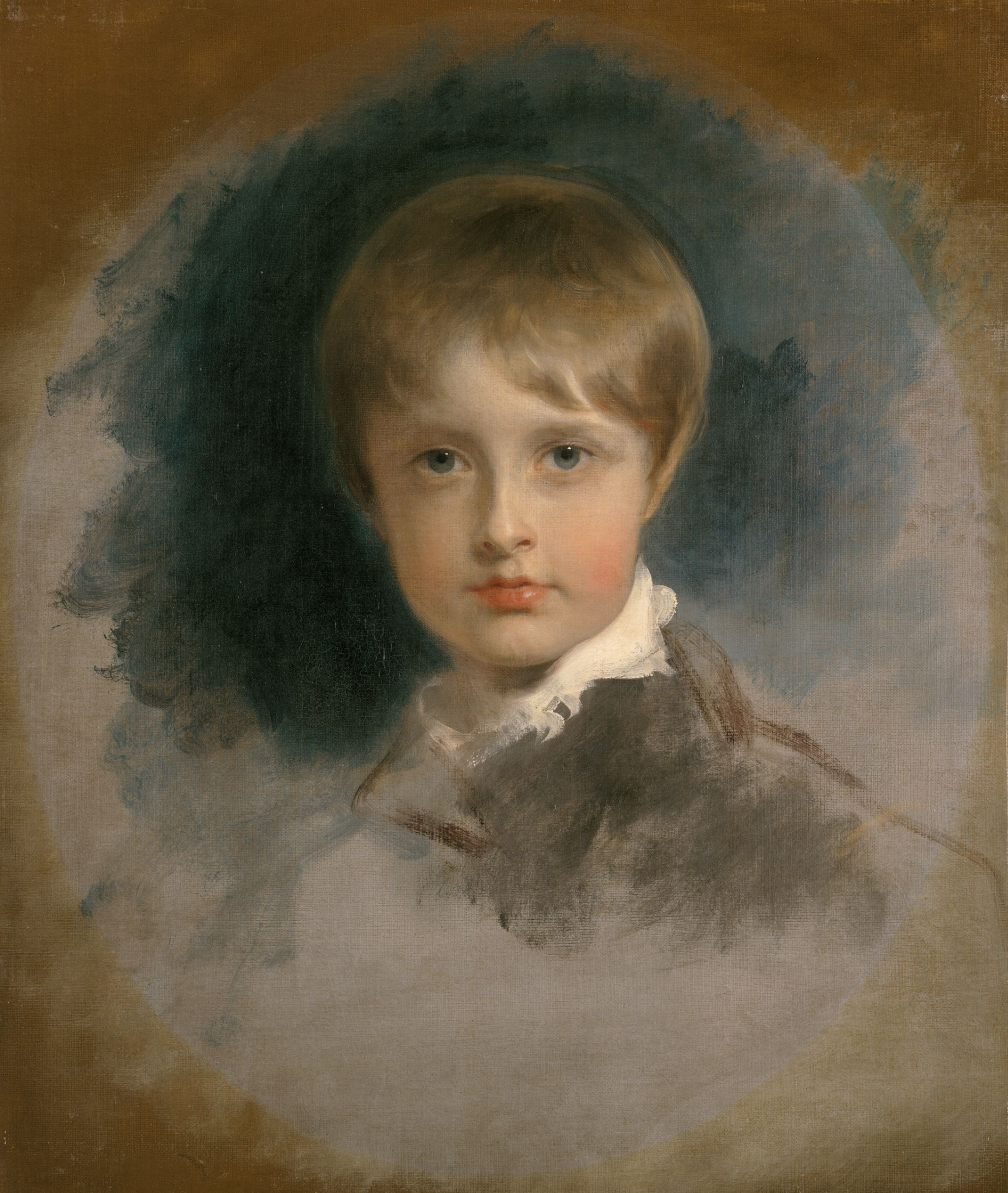
- Artist: Thomas Lawrence
- Year: 1818–1819
- Type: Oil on canvas, portrait painting
- Dimensions: 57.8 cm × 48.6 cm (22.8 in × 19.1 in)
- Location: Harvard Art Museums; Cambridge, Massachusetts

Portrait of Napoleon II is an 1819 portrait painting by the British artist Thomas Lawrence depicting Napoleon II, the young son of the deposed French Emperor Napoleon and his wife Marie Louise, a member of the Austrian imperial family.

== History and description ==
Following the defeat of Napoleon in 1814 he had abdicated in favour of his young son, but had instead been replaced by the restored Bourbon monarchy of Louis XVIII. The younger Napoleon was taken to Vienna (ruled by his grandfather Francis I of Austria), where he became known as the Duke of Reichstadt. To Bonapartists he was the legitimate heir to his father, then imprisoned in British custody on the island of Saint Helena. In 1832, he died at the age of twenty-one of tuberculosis.

Lawrence, Britain's leading portraitist, had recently attended the Congress of Aix-la-Chapelle to paint European leaders, as part of a large-scale commission from the Prince Regent. He then travelled on to the Austrian capital to continue his commission of major figures of the Habsburg dynasty, including a Portrait of the Austrian Emperor. The eight-year old Napoleon sat for Lawrence, first for a pencil-portrait in profile and then for this full-face painting intended for an oval shaped portrait. It remained unfinished and Michael Levey considered this made it "only the more haunting and poignant". The resemblance of the boy in the painting to his father was moving to General Bertrand and his wife Fanny, who had accompanied Napoleon I into exile.

Today it is in the collection of the Harvard Art Museums, having been acquired in 1943.

== Bibliography ==
- De Witt, Laetitia. L'Aiglon: Le rêve brisé de Napoléon. ISBN 9791021024762. Tallandier, 2020.
- Haynes, Christine. Our Friends the Enemies. The Occupation of France after Napoleon. ISBN 0674972317. Harvard University Press, 2018.
- Levey, Michael. Sir Thomas Lawrence. ISBN 0300109989. Yale University Press, 2005.
- Mackenzie, Norman. The Escape From Elba: The Fall & Flight of Napoleon 1814-1815. ISBN 1783834633. Pen and Sword, 2007.
