= Count of Clermont =

In the Middle Ages, there were several different Counts of Clermont ruling different counties.

- For the counts of Clermont in the Île-de-France, see Counts of Clermont-en-Beauvaisis.
- For the counts of Clermont-Ferrand, see List of rulers of Auvergne.
- For the counts of Clermont-sous-Huy, see Counts of Montaigu.
- For the counts of Clermont in Lorraine, see County of Clermont-en-Argonne.
- For the counts of Clermont (Chirens) in the Dauphiné, see Counts of Clermont-Tonnerre.

== See also ==
- Clermont County, Ohio
- House of Clermont
