= List of heirs to the French throne =

Coat of arms of the Dauphin of France, a title used by the heir-apparent to the French throne from 1350 to 1791, and from 1824 to 1830.

Heraldic crown of the Dauphin of France.

The following is a list of the heirs to the throne of the Kingdom of France, that is, those who were legally next in line to assume the throne upon the death of the King.

From 987 to 1792, all heirs to the French throne were male-line descendants of Hugh Capet.

== Capetian associate kings ==
The crown of France under the earliest Capetian monarchs was elective, not hereditary. There was no mechanism for automatic succession unless an heir was crowned as associate king, ready to step up as primary king when the previous king died. This procedure was very similar to the method by which the Germans elected a King of the Romans during the lifetime of the German monarch. The early Capetians generally made sure their sons were crowned as associate kings with them, with such success that the inheritance of the eldest son and heir to the kingship came to be accepted as a matter of right. Louis VI of France was the first king to take the throne without having been crowned in his father's time; however, his right to take the throne was initially contested.

House of Capet (987–1328)
Monarch	Co-king	Relationship to monarch	Crowned	Co-kingship ceased	Reason
Hughes "Capet"	No co-king Jun–Dec 987				
Hughes "Capet"	Robert (II)	Son	25 December 987	24 October 996	Became sole king
Robert II	No co-king 996–1017				
Robert II	Hughes	Son	19 June 1017	17 September 1025	Died
Robert II	No co-king 1025–1027				
Robert II	Henri (I)	Son	14 May 1027	20 July 1031	Became sole king
Henri I	No co-king 1031–1059				
Henri I	Philippe (I)	Son	23 May 1059	4 August 1060	Became sole king
Philippe I	No co-king 1060–1108				
Louis VI	No co-king 1108–1129				
Louis VI	Philippe	Son	14 April 1129	13 October 1131	Died
Louis VI	No co-king 13–25 Oct 1131				
Louis VI	Louis (VII)	Son	25 October 1131	1 August 1137	Became sole king
Louis VII	No co-king 1037–1079				
Louis VII	Philippe (II)	Son	1 November 1179	18 September 1180	Became sole king

== Capetian heirs by Salic succession I ==
After the accession of Philip II of France, the throne became de jure as well as de facto hereditary, so that on the death of the king, the legal heir became king immediately, and could exercise authority without coronation. The throne passed to the closest male heir.

Heirs who actually succeeded are shown in bold type. From 1350 on, the heir apparent to the French throne was styled Dauphin. The title was abandoned in 1791 in favor of the style Prince Royal, less than a year before the abolition of the monarchy.

House of Capet (987–1328)
Monarch	Heir	Status	Relationship to monarch	Became heir Reason	Ceased to be heir Reason	Next in line of succession
Philippe II	Succession uncertain (Note: Philippe II's closest living male relatives by Salic primogeniture, other than his own descendants, were his uncle, Robert I, Count of Dreux (1180–1188), and then his first cousin, Robert II, Count of Dreux (1188–1209).) 1180–1187					
Philippe II	**Louis**	Heir apparent	Son	5 September 1187; Born	14 July 1223; Father died, became king	None, 1187–1190
Philippe II	**Louis**	Heir apparent	Son	5 September 1187; Born	14 July 1223; Father died, became king	Robert, 1190, brother
Philippe II	**Louis**	Heir apparent	Son	5 September 1187; Born	14 July 1223; Father died, became king	Philippe, 1190, brother
Philippe II	**Louis**	Heir apparent	Son	5 September 1187; Born	14 July 1223; Father died, became king	None, 1190–1209
Philippe II	**Louis**	Heir apparent	Son	5 September 1187; Born	14 July 1223; Father died, became king	Philippe, 1209–1218, son
Philippe II	**Louis**	Heir apparent	Son	5 September 1187; Born	14 July 1223; Father died, became king	**Louis**, 1218–1223, son
Louis VIII	**Louis**	Heir apparent	Son	14 July 1223; Father became king	8 November 1226; Father died, became king	Robert, brother
Louis IX	Robert I, Count of Artois	Heir presumptive	Brother	8 November 1226; Brother became king	24 February 1244; Son born to king	Jean Tristan, 1226–1232, brother
Louis IX	Robert I, Count of Artois	Heir presumptive	Brother	8 November 1226; Brother became king	24 February 1244; Son born to king	Alphonse, Count of Poitiers, 1232–1244, brother
Louis IX	Louis	Heir apparent	Son	24 February 1244; Born	11 January 1260; Died	Robert I, Count of Artois, 1244–1245, uncle
Louis IX	Louis	Heir apparent	Son	24 February 1244; Born	11 January 1260; Died	**Philippe**, 1245–1260, brother
Louis IX	**Philippe**	Heir apparent	Son	11 January 1260; Brother died	25 August 1270; Father died, became king	Jean Tristan, Count of Valois, 1260–1264, brother
Louis IX	**Philippe**	Heir apparent	Son	11 January 1260; Brother died	25 August 1270; Father died, became king	Louis, 1264–1270, son
Philippe III	Louis	Heir apparent	Son	25 August 1270; Father became king	May 1276; Died	**Philippe**, brother
Philippe III	**Philippe**	Heir apparent	Son	May 1276; Brother died	5 October 1285; Father died, became king	Charles, Count of Valois, brother
Philippe IV	Charles, Count of Valois	Heir presumptive	Brother	5 October 1285; Brother became king	4 October 1289; Son born to king	Louis, Count of Évreux, half-brother
Philippe IV	**Louis**	Heir apparent	Son	4 October 1289; Born	29 November 1314; Father died, became king	Charles, Count of Valois, 1289–1293, uncle
Philippe IV	**Louis**	Heir apparent	Son	4 October 1289; Born	29 November 1314; Father died, became king	**Philippe, Count of Poitiers**, 1293–1314, brother
Louis X	**Philippe, Count of Poitiers**	Heir presumptive	Brother	29 November 1314; Brother became king	5 June 1316; Brother died, sister-in-law pregnant	**Charles, Count of La Marche**, brother
(Note: On 5 June 1316, Louis X died while Queen Clémence was pregnant, so the throne went vacant, depending on whether the unborn child was a male or a female: a male would make that child king, while a female would make the late king's next brother (Philippe, Count of Poitiers) king. During this period, Philippe ruled as regent until the child, a boy, was born on 15 November 1316; he was King Jean I from birth. On 19 November 1316, Jean I died, four days after his birth, and the regent became King Philippe V.)
Jean I	**Philippe, Count of Poitiers**	Heir presumptive	Uncle	15 November 1316; Posthumous son born to the late king	19 November 1316; Nephew died, became king	Philippe (Note: Born on 24 June 1316, between Louis X's death and Jean I's birth.), son
Philippe V	Philippe	Heir apparent	Son	19 November 1316; Father became king	24 February 1317; Died	**Charles, Count of La Marche**, uncle
Philippe V	**Charles, Count of La Marche**	Heir presumptive	Brother	24 February 1317; Nephew died	3 January 1322; Brother died, became king	Philippe, son
Charles IV	Philippe	Heir apparent	Son	3 January 1322; Father became king	24 March 1322; Died	Charles, Count of Valois, granduncle
Charles IV	Charles, Count of Valois	Heir presumptive	Uncle	24 March 1322; Grandnephew died	20 March 1324; Son born to king	**Philippe, Count of Maine**, son
Charles IV	Louis	Heir apparent	Son	20 March 1324; Born	21 March 1324; Died	Charles, Count of Valois, granduncle
Charles IV	Charles, Count of Valois	Heir presumptive	Uncle	21 March 1324; Grandnephew died	16 December 1325; Died	**Philippe, Count of Maine**, son
Charles IV	**Philippe, Count of Valois**	Heir presumptive	1st cousin	16 December 1325; Father died	1 February 1328; 1st cousin died, his wife pregnant	**Jean of Valois**, son
(Note: On 1 February 1328, Charles IV died while Queen Jeanne was pregnant, so the throne went vacant, depending on whether the unborn child was a male or a female: a male would make that child king, while a female would make the late king's first cousin (Philippe, Count of Valois) king. During this period, Philippe ruled as regent until the child, a girl named Blanche, was born on 1 April 1328; as a result, the regent became King Philippe VI.)
House of Valois (1328–1589)
Monarch	Heir	Status	Relationship to monarch	Became heir Reason	Ceased to be heir Reason	Next in line of succession
Philippe VI	**Jean, Duke of Normandy**	Heir apparent	Son	1 April 1328; Father became king	22 August 1350; Father died, became king	Charles II, Count of Alençon, 1328–1330, uncle
Philippe VI	**Jean, Duke of Normandy**	Heir apparent	Son	1 April 1328; Father became king	22 August 1350; Father died, became king	Louis, 1330, brother
Philippe VI	**Jean, Duke of Normandy**	Heir apparent	Son	1 April 1328; Father became king	22 August 1350; Father died, became king	Charles II, Count of Alençon, 1330–1333, uncle
Philippe VI	**Jean, Duke of Normandy**	Heir apparent	Son	1 April 1328; Father became king	22 August 1350; Father died, became king	Jean, 1330, brother
Philippe VI	**Jean, Duke of Normandy**	Heir apparent	Son	1 April 1328; Father became king	22 August 1350; Father died, became king	Charles II, Count of Alençon, 1333–1336, uncle
Philippe VI	**Jean, Duke of Normandy**	Heir apparent	Son	1 April 1328; Father became king	22 August 1350; Father died, became king	Philippe, Duke of Orléans, 1336–1338, brother
Philippe VI	**Jean, Duke of Normandy**	Heir apparent	Son	1 April 1328; Father became king	22 August 1350; Father died, became king	**Charles**, 1338–1350, son
Jean II	**Charles, Dauphin of France**	Heir apparent	Son	22 August 1350; Father became king	8 April 1364; Father died, became king	Louis I, Duke of Anjou, brother
Charles V	Louis I, Duke of Anjou	Heir presumptive	Brother	8 April 1364; Brother became king	7 June 1366; Son born to king	Jean, Duke of Berry, brother
Charles V	Jean	Heir apparent	Son	7 June 1366; Born	21 December 1366; Died	Louis I, Duke of Anjou, uncle
Charles V	Louis I, Duke of Anjou	Heir presumptive	Brother	21 December 1366; Nephew died	3 December 1368; Son born to king	Jean, Duke of Berry, brother
Charles V	**Charles, Dauphin of France**	Heir apparent	Son	3 December 1368; Born	16 September 1380; Father died, became king	Louis I, Duke of Anjou, 1368–1372, uncle
Charles V	**Charles, Dauphin of France**	Heir apparent	Son	3 December 1368; Born	16 September 1380; Father died, became king	Louis, 1372–1380, brother
Charles VI	Louis	Heir presumptive	Brother	16 September 1380; Brother became king	25 September 1386; Son born to king	Louis I, Duke of Anjou, 1380–1384, uncle
Charles VI	Louis	Heir presumptive	Brother	16 September 1380; Brother became king	25 September 1386; Son born to king	Louis II, Duke of Anjou, 1384–1386, 1st cousin
Charles VI	Charles, Dauphin of France	Heir apparent	Son	25 September 1386; Born	28 December 1386; Died	Louis, Duke of Touraine, uncle
Charles VI	Louis, Duke of Touraine	Heir presumptive	Brother	28 December 1386; Nephew died	6 February 1392; Son born to king	Louis II, Duke of Anjou, 1st cousin
Charles VI	Charles, Dauphin of France	Heir apparent	Son	6 February 1392; Born	13 January 1401; Died	Louis I, Duke of Orléans, 1392–1397, uncle
Charles VI	Charles, Dauphin of France	Heir apparent	Son	6 February 1392; Born	13 January 1401; Died	Louis, 1397–1401, brother
Charles VI	Louis, Dauphin of France	Heir apparent	Son	13 January 1401; Brother died	18 December 1415; Died	Jean, Duke of Touraine, brother
Charles VI	Jean, Dauphin of France	Heir apparent	Son	18 December 1415; Brother died	5 April 1417; Died	**Charles, Count of Ponthieu**, brother
Charles VI	**Charles, Dauphin of France**	Heir apparent	Son	5 April 1417; Brother died	21 October 1422; Father died, became king (Note: Charles VII became king in little more than name, as in 1422 much of France was either in rebellion against his authority or under the control of an English occupation force, in the name of King Henry VI of England (his nephew, son of Catherine of Valois), who had been proclaimed King of France according to the Treaty of Troyes. Over the course of his reign Charles VII reasserted control over most of France.)	Charles I, Duke of Orléans, 1st cousin

== Lancastrian succession ==
On May 21, 1420, the government of Charles VI was obliged to sign the Treaty of Troyes, which provided a legal framework for the transfer of power to Henry V, King of England, who had invaded and occupied northern France, including Paris. Under the treaty, Henry, who was to marry Charles' daughter Catherine, was named as "Heir of France" and the Dauphin Charles was disinherited. The treaty was not recognized by those factions which were still at war with England, and only had legal force in English-occupied territory and, more briefly, in the Burgundian lands (1420–1435) and in Brittany.

Monarch	Heir	Status	Relationship to monarch	Became heir Reason	Ceased to be heir Reason	Next in line of succession
Charles VI	King Henry V of England	Heir apparent	Son-in-law	21 May 1420; Treaty of Troyes	31 August 1422; Died	Thomas, Duke of Clarence, brother, 1420—1421
Charles VI	King Henry V of England	Heir apparent	Son-in-law	21 May 1420; Treaty of Troyes	31 August 1422; Died	John, Duke of Bedford, brother, 1421
Charles VI	King Henry V of England	Heir apparent	Son-in-law	21 May 1420; Treaty of Troyes	31 August 1422; Died	Henry, Duke of Cornwall, son, 1421–1422
Charles VI	King Henry VI of England	Heir apparent	Grandson	31 August 1422; Father died	21 October 1422; Grandfather died, became king	John, Duke of Bedford, uncle
House of Lancaster (1422—1453)
Monarch	Heir	Status	Relationship to monarch	Became heir Reason	Ceased to be heir Reason	Next in line of succession
Henri II
Henri II	John, Duke of Bedford	Heir presumptive	Uncle	21 October 1422; Nephew became king	14 September 1435; Died	Humphrey, Duke of Gloucester, brother
Henri II	Humphrey, Duke of Gloucester	Heir presumptive	Uncle	14 September 1435; Brother died	23 February 1447; Died	Richard, Duke of York, 2nd cousin
Henri II	Richard, Duke of York	Heir presumptive	2nd cousin -1	23 February 1447; 2nd cousin died	13 October 1453; Son born to king	Edward, Earl of March, Son
Henri II	Edward, Duke of Cornwall	Heir apparent	Son	13 October 1453; Born	19 October 1453; Father deposed	Richard, Duke of York, 2nd cousin -2

== Capetian heirs by Salic succession II ==
In southern France, the treaty of Troyes was never regarded as valid, and Charles VII was considered to have become king upon his father's death. Given his repudiation by his father, however, his status remained uncertain until his coronation at Reims on 17 July 1429. In the following two decades Charles VII regained control of most of France; the English were finally expelled from Guienne on 19 October 1453, retaining only the port of Calais.

House of Valois (1328–1589)
Monarch	Heir	Status	Relationship to monarch	Became heir Reason	Ceased to be heir Reason	Next in line of succession
Charles VII	Charles I, Duke of Orléans	Heir presumptive	1st cousin	21 October 1422; 1st cousin became king	3 July 1423; Son born to king	Jean, Count of Angoulême, brother
Charles VII	Louis, Dauphin of France	Heir apparent	Son	3 July 1423; Born	22 July 1461; Father died, became king	Charles I, Duke of Orléans, 1423–1426, 1st cousin –1
Charles VII	Louis, Dauphin of France	Heir apparent	Son	3 July 1423; Born	22 July 1461; Father died, became king	Jean, 1426, brother
Charles VII	Louis, Dauphin of France	Heir apparent	Son	3 July 1423; Born	22 July 1461; Father died, became king	Charles I, Duke of Orléans, 1423–1426, 1st cousin –1
Charles VII	Louis, Dauphin of France	Heir apparent	Son	3 July 1423; Born	22 July 1461; Father died, became king	Jacques, 1432–1437, brother
Charles VII	Louis, Dauphin of France	Heir apparent	Son	3 July 1423; Born	22 July 1461; Father died, became king	Charles I, Duke of Orléans, 1437–1446, 1st cousin –1
Charles VII	Louis, Dauphin of France	Heir apparent	Son	3 July 1423; Born	22 July 1461; Father died, became king	Charles, 1446–1458, brother
Charles VII	Louis, Dauphin of France	Heir apparent	Son	3 July 1423; Born	22 July 1461; Father died, became king	Louis, 1458–1460, son
Charles VII	Louis, Dauphin of France	Heir apparent	Son	3 July 1423; Born	22 July 1461; Father died, became king	Charles, 1460–1461, brother
Louis XI	Charles, Duke of Berry	Heir presumptive	Brother	22 July 1461; Brother became king	4 December 1466; Son born to king	Charles I, Duke of Orléans, 1461–1465, 1st cousin –1
Louis XI	Charles, Duke of Berry	Heir presumptive	Brother	22 July 1461; Brother became king	4 December 1466; Son born to king	Louis II, Duke of Orléans, 1465–1466, 2nd cousin
Louis XI	François, Dauphin of France	Heir apparent	Son	4 December 1466; Born	4 December 1466; Died	Charles, Duke of Berry, uncle
Louis XI	Charles, Duke of Berry	Heir presumptive	Brother	4 December 1466; Nephew died	30 June 1470; Son born to king	Louis II, Duke of Orléans, 1465–1466, 2nd cousin
Louis XI	Charles, Dauphin of France	Heir apparent	Son	30 June 1470; Born	30 August 1483; Father died, became king	Charles, Duke of Berry, 1470–1472, uncle
Louis XI	Charles, Dauphin of France	Heir apparent	Son	30 June 1470; Born	30 August 1483; Father died, became king	Louis II, Duke of Orléans, 1472, 2nd cousin –1
Louis XI	Charles, Dauphin of France	Heir apparent	Son	30 June 1470; Born	30 August 1483; Father died, became king	François, 1472–1473, brother
Louis XI	Charles, Dauphin of France	Heir apparent	Son	30 June 1470; Born	30 August 1483; Father died, became king	Louis II, Duke of Orléans, 1473–1483, 2nd cousin –1
Charles VIII	Louis II, Duke of Orléans	Heir presumptive	2nd cousin –1	30 August 1483; 2nd cousin +1 became king	11 October 1492; Son born to king	Charles, Count of Angoulême, 1st cousin
Charles VIII	Charles Orland, Dauphin of France	Heir apparent	Son	11 October 1492; Born	16 December 1495; Died	Louis II, Duke of Orléans, 2nd cousin –2
Charles VIII	Louis II, Duke of Orléans	Heir presumptive	2nd cousin –1	16 December 1495; 2nd cousin +2 died	8 September 1496; Son born to king	Charles, Count of Angoulême, 1495–1496, 1st cousin
Charles VIII	Louis II, Duke of Orléans	Heir presumptive	2nd cousin –1	16 December 1495; 2nd cousin +2 died	8 September 1496; Son born to king	François, Count of Angoulême, 1496, 1st cousin +1
Charles VIII	Charles, Dauphin of France	Heir apparent	Son	8 September 1496; Born	2 October 1496; Died	Louis II, Duke of Orléans, 2nd cousin –2
Charles VIII	Louis II, Duke of Orléans	Heir presumptive	2nd cousin –1	2 October 1496; 2nd cousin +2 died	July 1497; Son born to king	François, Count of Angoulême, 1st cousin +1
Charles VIII	François, Dauphin de France	Heir apparent	Son	July 1497; Born	1497; Died	Louis II, Duke of Orléans, 2nd cousin –2
Charles VIII	Louis II, Duke of Orléans	Heir presumptive	2nd cousin –1	1497; 2nd cousin +2 died	7 April 1498; 2nd cousin +1 died, became king	François, Count of Angoulême, 1st cousin +1
Louis XII	François, Duke of Valois	Heir presumptive	1st cousin +1	7 April 1498; 1st cousin –1 became king	1 January 1515; 1st cousin –1 died, became king	Charles IV, Duke of Alençon, 5th cousin –1
François I	Charles IV, Duke of Alençon	Heir presumptive	5th cousin –1	1 January 1515; 5th cousin +1 became king	28 February 1518; Son born to king	Charles III, Duke of Bourbon, 7th cousin
François I	François, Dauphin of France	Heir apparent	Son	28 February 1518; Born	10 August 1536; Died	Charles IV, Duke of Alençon, 1518–1519, 5th cousin –2
François I	François, Dauphin of France	Heir apparent	Son	28 February 1518; Born	10 August 1536; Died	Henri I, Duke of Orléans, 1519–1536, brother
François I	Henri, Dauphin of France	Heir apparent	Son	10 August 1536; Brother died	31 March 1547; Father died, became king	Charles II, Duke of Orléans, 1536–1544, brother
François I	Henri, Dauphin of France	Heir apparent	Son	10 August 1536; Brother died	31 March 1547; Father died, became king	François, 1544–1547, son
Henri II	François, Dauphin of France	Heir apparent	Son	31 March 1547; Father became king	10 July 1559; Father died, became king	Antoine, Duke of Vendôme, 1547–1549, 8th cousin –2
Henri II	François, Dauphin of France	Heir apparent	Son	31 March 1547; Father became king	10 July 1559; Father died, became king	Louis III, Duke of Orléans, 1549–1550, brother
Henri II	François, Dauphin of France	Heir apparent	Son	31 March 1547; Father became king	10 July 1559; Father died, became king	Charles III, Duke of Orléans, 1550–1559, brother
François II	Charles III, Duke of Orléans	Heir presumptive	Brother	10 July 1559; Brother became king	5 December 1560; Brother died, became king	Henri, Duke of Angoulême, brother
Charles IX	Henri, Duke of Anjou	Heir presumptive	Brother	5 December 1560; Brother became king	30 May 1574; Brother died, became king	François, Duke of Alençon, brother
Henri III	François, Duke of Anjou	Heir presumptive	Brother	30 May 1574; Brother became king	10 June 1584; Died	King Henry II of Navarre, 9th cousin –1
Henri III	King Henry II of Navarre	Heir presumptive	9th cousin –1	10 June 1584; 9th cousin +1 died	2 August 1589; 9th cousin +1 assassinated, became king	Charles, Cardinal de Bourbon, uncle
House of Bourbon (1589–1792)
Monarch	Heir	Status	Relationship to monarch	Became heir Reason	Ceased to be heir Reason	Next in line of succession
Henri IV	Charles, Cardinal de Bourbon	Heir presumptive	Uncle	2 August 1589; Nephew became king	9 May 1590; Died	Henri II, Prince of Condé, grandnephew
Henri IV	Henri II, Prince of Condé	Heir presumptive	1st cousin +1	9 May 1590; Granduncle died	27 September 1601; Son born to king	François, Prince of Conti, uncle
Henri IV	Louis, Dauphin of France	Heir apparent	Son	27 September 1601; Born	14 May 1610; Father assassinated, became king	Henri II, Prince of Condé, 1601–1607, 2nd cousin
Henri IV	Louis, Dauphin of France	Heir apparent	Son	27 September 1601; Born	14 May 1610; Father assassinated, became king	The Duke of Orléans, 1607–1610, brother
Louis XIII	The Duke of Orléans	Heir presumptive	Brother	14 May 1610; Brother became king	17 November 1611; Died	Gaston, Duke of Anjou, brother
Louis XIII	Gaston, Duke of Orléans	Heir presumptive	Brother	17 November 1611; Brother died	5 September 1638; Son born to king	Henri II, Prince of Condé, 2nd cousin
Louis XIII	Louis, Dauphin of France	Heir apparent	Son	5 September 1638; Born	14 May 1643; Father died, became king	Gaston, Duke of Orléans, 1638–1640, uncle
Louis XIII	Louis, Dauphin of France	Heir apparent	Son	5 September 1638; Born	14 May 1643; Father died, became king	Philippe, Duke of Anjou, 1640–1643, brother
Louis XIV	Philippe, Duke of Anjou, later Duke of Orléans	Heir presumptive	Brother	14 May 1643; Brother became king	1 November 1661; Son born to king	Gaston, Duke of Orléans, 1643–1660, uncle
Louis XIV	Philippe, Duke of Anjou, later Duke of Orléans	Heir presumptive	Brother	14 May 1643; Brother became king	1 November 1661; Son born to king	Louis II, Prince of Condé, 1660–1661, 3rd cousin
Louis XIV	Louis, Dauphin of France	Heir apparent	Son	1 November 1661; Born	14 April 1711; Died	Philippe I, Duke of Orléans, 1661–1668, uncle
Louis XIV	Louis, Dauphin of France	Heir apparent	Son	1 November 1661; Born	14 April 1711; Died	Philippe Charles, Duke of Anjou, 1668–1671, brother
Louis XIV	Louis, Dauphin of France	Heir apparent	Son	1 November 1661; Born	14 April 1711; Died	Philippe I, Duke of Orléans, 1671–1672, uncle
Louis XIV	Louis, Dauphin of France	Heir apparent	Son	1 November 1661; Born	14 April 1711; Died	Louis François, Duke of Anjou, 1672, brother
Louis XIV	Louis, Dauphin of France	Heir apparent	Son	1 November 1661; Born	14 April 1711; Died	Philippe I, Duke of Orléans, 1672–1682, uncle
Louis XIV	Louis, Dauphin of France	Heir apparent	Son	1 November 1661; Born	14 April 1711; Died	Louis, Duke of Burgundy, 1682–1711, son
Louis XIV	Louis, Dauphin of France	Heir apparent	Grandson	14 April 1711; Father died	18 February 1712; Died	Louis, Duke of Brittany, son
Louis XIV	Louis, Dauphin of France	Heir apparent	Great-grandson	18 February 1712; Father died	8 March 1712; Died	Louis, Duke of Anjou, brother
Louis XIV	Louis, Dauphin of France	Heir apparent	Great-grandson	8 March 1712; Brother died	1 September 1715; Great-grandfather died, became king	King Felipe V of Spain, 1712–1713 (Note: Renounced succession rights for himself and descendants in the Peace of Utrecht.), uncle
Louis XIV	Louis, Dauphin of France	Heir apparent	Great-grandson	8 March 1712; Brother died	1 September 1715; Great-grandfather died, became king	Charles, Duke of Berry, 1713–1714, uncle
Louis XIV	Louis, Dauphin of France	Heir apparent	Great-grandson	8 March 1712; Brother died	1 September 1715; Great-grandfather died, became king	Philippe II, Duke of Orléans, 1714–1715, 1st cousin –2
Louis XV	Philippe II, Duke of Orléans	Heir presumptive	1st cousin –2	1 September 1715; 1st cousin +2 became king	2 December 1723; Died	Louis, Duke of Chartres, son
Louis XV	Louis, Duke of Orléans	Heir presumptive	2nd cousin –1	2 December 1723; Father died	4 September 1729; Son born to king	Louis IV Henri, Prince of Condé, 1723–1725, 5th cousin +1
Louis XV	Louis, Duke of Orléans	Heir presumptive	2nd cousin –1	2 December 1723; Father died	4 September 1729; Son born to king	Louis Philippe I, Duke of Chartres, 1725–1729, son
Louis XV	Louis, Dauphin of France	Heir apparent	Son	4 September 1729; Born	20 December 1765; Died	Louis, Duke of Orléans, 1729–1730, 2nd cousin –2
Louis XV	Louis, Dauphin of France	Heir apparent	Son	4 September 1729; Born	20 December 1765; Died	Philippe, Duke of Anjou, 1730–1733, brother
Louis XV	Louis, Dauphin of France	Heir apparent	Son	4 September 1729; Born	20 December 1765; Died	Louis, Duke of Orléans, 1733–1751, 2nd cousin –2
Louis XV	Louis, Dauphin of France	Heir apparent	Son	4 September 1729; Born	20 December 1765; Died	Louis, Duke of Burgundy, 1751–1761, son
Louis XV	Louis, Dauphin of France	Heir apparent	Son	4 September 1729; Born	20 December 1765; Died	Louis Auguste, Duke of Berry, 1761–1765, son
Louis XV	Louis Auguste, Dauphin of France	Heir apparent	Grandson	20 December 1765; Father died	10 May 1774; Grandfather died, became king	Louis Stanislas, Count of Provence, brother
Louis XVI	Louis Stanislas, Count of Provence	Heir presumptive	Brother	10 May 1774; Brother became king	22 October 1781; Son born to king	Charles, Count of Artois, brother
Louis XVI	Louis Joseph, Dauphin of France	Heir apparent	Son	22 October 1781; Born	4 June 1789; Died	Louis Stanislas, Count of Provence, 1781–1785, uncle
Louis XVI	Louis Joseph, Dauphin of France	Heir apparent	Son	22 October 1781; Born	4 June 1789; Died	Louis Charles, Duke of Normandy, 1785–1789, brother
Louis XVI	Louis Charles, Dauphin of France (Prince Royal from 1791)	Heir apparent	Son	4 June 1789; Brother died	21 September 1792; Monarchy abolished (First Republic)	Louis Stanislas, Count of Provence, uncle
Louis XVII (Note: Following the abolition of the monarchy by the National Convention, Louis XVI and his family were held in confinement. Louis XVI was found guilty by the Convention of treason against the state, and was executed on 21 January 1793. Louis Charles, Dauphin of France was thereafter proclaimed "Louis XVII of France" by French royalists, but never reigned in practice, and died in prison on 8 June 1795, aged 10.)	Disputed reign 1793–1795					

Following the abolition of the monarchy of France by the French National Convention, Louis XVI and his family were held in confinement. Louis XVI was found guilty by the Convention of treason against the state, and was executed on 21 January 1793. The Dauphin Louis–Charles was thereafter proclaimed "Louis XVII of France" by French royalists, but was kept confined and never reigned. He died of illness on 8 June 1795.

Louis–Stanislas–Xavier, Count of Provence, was subsequently proclaimed "Louis XVIII", but was in exile from France and powerless.

== Bonaparte succession: First Empire ==
France passed through a series of republican regimes until a hereditary monarchy was restored in the person of Napoleon Bonaparte, who was proclaimed hereditary Emperor of the French on 18 May 1804. The succession law promulgated at the same time also demanded a Salic succession, in which Napoleon was to be succeeded by, first, his own legitimate offspring, then his elder brother Joseph Bonaparte and his descendants, and finally his younger brother Louis Bonaparte and his descendants. (Napoleon's other brothers were omitted for various reasons.) The title of the heir apparent of the First Empire was King of Rome.

House of Bonaparte (1804–1814)
Monarch	Heir	Status	Relationship to monarch	Became heir Reason	Ceased to be heir Reason	Next in line of succession
Napoléon I	Joseph Bonaparte	Heir presumptive	Brother	18 May 1804; First Empire established	20 March 1811; Son born to emperor	Louis Bonaparte, brother
Napoléon I	Napoléon François, King of Rome	Heir apparent	Son	20 March 1811; Born	6 April 1814; First Empire abolished (Bourbon monarchy restored)	Joseph Bonaparte, uncle

Napoleon I was defeated by an alliance of most of the other European powers, and abdicated unconditionally, for himself and his son, on 6 April 1814 (an abdication given legal force by a treaty with the Allies dated 11 April 1814) and went into exile.

== Restored Bourbon succession I ==
On 6 April 1814, the Senate of the French Empire summoned Louis Stanislas Xavier, Count of Provence—already styling himself "Louis XVIII"—to become head of a restored, but constitutional, French monarchy. Louis' younger brother, Charles, Count of Artois, came to Paris on 12 April and was appointed Lieutenant-General of the realm; Louis himself returned on 3 May, and on 4 June he authorized the publication of a constitution for France (the Charter of 1814) by which he became a constitutional monarch. With the acceptance of this constitution we can say that the monarchy was resumed, although by royalist principles the Republican and Imperial governments of 1792–1814 had all been illegitimate, and the monarchy itself had never ceased.

House of Bourbon (1814–1815)
Monarch	Heir	Status	Relationship to monarch	Became heir Reason	Ceased to be heir Reason	Next in line of succession
Louis XVIII	Charles, Count of Artois	Heir presumptive	Brother	6 April 1814; Bourbon monarchy restored	20 March 1815; Bourbon monarchy abolished (First Empire's Hundred Days)	Louis Antoine, Duke of Angoulême, son

On 1 March 1815, however, Napoleon returned to France. With Napoleon I within miles of the capital, Louis XVIII and all his family fled Paris on 19 March, and for the next several months they remained in exile, until the victory of Waterloo allowed them to return.

== Restored Bonaparte succession ==
On 20 March Napoleon entered Paris and once again proclaimed the Empire. Although the Imperial Constitution was amended in a more democratic direction, the hereditary office of Emperor and the succession laws remained unchanged.

House of Bonaparte (Mar–Jun 1815)
Monarch	Heir	Status	Relationship to monarch	Became heir Reason	Ceased to be heir Reason	Next in line of succession
Napoléon I	Napoléon François, King of Rome	Heir apparent	Son	20 March 1815; First Empire restored (Hundred Days)	22 June 1815; Father abdicated, technically became emperor	Joseph Bonaparte, uncle
Napoléon II	Disputed reign Jun–Jul 1815					
Napoléon II	Joseph Bonaparte	Heir presumptive	Uncle	22 June 1815; Nephew technically became emperor	8 July 1815; First Empire abolished (Bourbon monarchy restored)	Louis Bonaparte, brother

This restored First Empire lasted until 22 June 1815, when Napoleon abdicated again, this time in favor of a regency on behalf of his son (who had been separated from his father in 1814 and was living in Vienna, Austria). The nominal reign of Napoleon II lasted no longer than until 7 July 1815, when an Allied army occupied Paris. Napoleon I was now exiled to the Atlantic island of St. Helena, where he died a prisoner 5 May 1821. Napoleon II continued to live under close observation in Vienna until he died of tuberculosis 22 July 1832. Neither Joseph nor Louis Bonaparte ever made any effort on behalf of the imperial claims that had descended to them.

== Restored Bourbon succession II ==
On July 8 Louis XVIII returned to Paris. Government was resumed under the 1814 Constitution as before.

House of Bourbon (1815–1830)
Monarch	Heir	Status	Relationship to monarch	Became heir Reason	Ceased to be heir Reason	Next in line of succession
Louis XVIII	Charles, Count of Artois	Heir presumptive	Brother	8 July 1815; Bourbon monarchy restored	16 September 1824; Brother died, became king	Louis Antoine, Duke of Angoulême, son
Charles X	Louis Antoine, Dauphin of France	Heir apparent	Son	16 September 1824; Father became king	2 August 1830; Father abdicated, technically became king	Henri, Duke of Bordeaux, nephew
Louis XIX	Disputed reign 2 Aug 1830					
Louis XIX	Henri, Duke of Bordeaux	Heir presumptive	Nephew	2 August 1830; Uncle technically became king and abdicated 20 minutes later, technically became king		Louis Philippe III, Duke of Orléans, 5th cousin –2
Henri V	Disputed reign 2–9 Aug 1830					
Henri V	Louis Philippe III, Duke of Orléans	Heir presumptive	5th cousin –2	2 August 1830; 5th cousin +2 technically became king	9 August 1830; Bourbon monarchy abolished (July Monarchy), became king	Ferdinand Philippe, Duke of Chartres, son

Charles X's attempt in July 1830 to suspend the Charter of 1814 prompted a revolution. After several days of violence at the end of July and the beginning of August, Charles and his son fled Paris and signed an instrument of abdication. The intended beneficiary of the abdication was Charles' grandson (the Dauphin's nephew) Henry, Duke of Bordeaux, a child of 9.

== Orléans succession ==
After several days of discussion, the French Chamber of Deputies chose to ignore the instrument and instead proclaimed Louis-Philippe, Duke of Orléans, as King on 9 August 1830.

Under the Orléans régime, the style Dauphin was not used for the heir apparent to the French throne; he was called instead Prince Royal, in accordance with the 1791–1792 usage.

House of Bourbon-Orléans (1830–1848)
Monarch	Heir	Status	Relationship to monarch	Became heir Reason	Ceased to be heir Reason	Next in line of succession
Louis Philippe I	Prince Ferdinand Philippe, Prince Royal	Heir apparent	Son	9 August 1830; July Monarchy established	13 July 1842; Died	Prince Louis, Duke of Nemours, 1830–1838, brother
Louis Philippe I	Prince Ferdinand Philippe, Prince Royal	Heir apparent	Son	9 August 1830; July Monarchy established	13 July 1842; Died	Prince Philippe, Count of Paris, 1838–1842, son
Louis Philippe I	Prince Philippe, Prince Royal	Heir apparent	Grandson	13 July 1842; Father died	24 February 1848; Grandfather abdicated, technically became king	Prince Robert, Duke of Chartres, brother
Louis Philippe II	Disputed reign 24–26 Feb 1848					
Louis Philippe II	Prince Robert, Duke of Chartres	Heir presumptive	Brother	24 February 1848; Brother technically became king	26 February 1848; July Monarchy abolished (Second Republic)	Prince Louis, Duke of Nemours, brother

After a further revolutionary upheaval in 1848, Louis-Philippe abdicated on 24 February in favor of his grandson Philippe. The choice of Philippe was not accepted by the Chamber of Deputies, and instead the monarchy was abolished and a new Republic declared.

== Bonaparte succession: Second Empire ==
The Second Republic elected as its president Louis-Napoléon Bonaparte, son of Napoleon I's brother Louis Bonaparte. President Bonaparte overthrew the Republic by self coup on 2 December 1851; exactly one year later, following a plebiscite, he converted himself into an Emperor, Napoleon III—considering the brief reign of "Napoleon II" in 1815 as valid.

The succession laws were similar to those of the First Empire, except that Jérôme Bonaparte and his male-line male descendants were, by special decree, eligible for the succession, following the descendants of Napoleon III himself (Joseph Bonaparte had died leaving no male children; other than Napoleon III, no other descendants of Louis Bonaparte survived by 1852).

The heir apparent of the Emperor was titled Prince Imperial, parallel to the Orléans title of Prince Royal.

House of Bonaparte (1852–1870)
Monarch	Heir	Status	Relationship to monarch	Became heir Reason	Ceased to be heir Reason	Next in line of succession
Napoléon III	Succession uncertain 2–18 Dec 1852					
Napoléon III	Jérôme Bonaparte	Heir presumptive	Uncle	18 December 1852; Nominated by decree	16 March 1856; Son born to emperor	Prince Napoléon-Jérôme Bonaparte (Note: Jérôme Bonaparte had an older son by a first marriage, Jérôme Napoléon Bonaparte, but he was an American citizen and he and his descendants were not considered part of the line of succession.), son
Napoléon III	Prince Louis-Napoléon, Prince Imperial	Heir apparent	Son	16 March 1856; Born	4 September 1870; Second Empire abolished (Third Republic)	Jérôme Bonaparte, 1856–1860, granduncle
Napoléon III	Prince Louis-Napoléon, Prince Imperial	Heir apparent	Son	16 March 1856; Born	4 September 1870; Second Empire abolished (Third Republic)	Prince Napoléon-Jérôme Bonaparte, 1860–1870, 1st cousin –1

With the failure of the Imperial army at the Battle of Sedan in the Franco-Prussian War, Napoleon III was captured and his government collapsed. Two days after the battle a Third Republic was declared which would last for seventy years. The Imperial family went into exile. France has not been ruled by a monarchy from this point.

== See also ==
- List of French monarchs
- Fundamental laws of the Kingdom of France
